= Khanom bodin =

Thai cake

- Type: Cake
- Course: Dessert
- Place of origin: Thailand
- Region or state: Muslim community in central Thailand
- Created by: Possibly originated from Portuguese desserts adapted by Thai Muslim
- Main ingredients: wheat flour (or Maida flour), fresh butter, fresh milk, chicken eggs, sweetened condensed milk, white sugar

Khanom bodin (Thai: ขนมบดิน, pronounced [kʰà-nǒm bò-din]) is a traditional Thai Muslim cake, believed to have originated from Portuguese desserts like other Thai desserts such as thong muan, thong yip, thong yot, foi thong, luk chup, khanom mo kaeng or khanom farang kudi chin.

The name khanom bodin is assumed to be from the word khanom mo din (ขนมหม้อดิน, pronounced [kʰà-nǒm mɔ̂ɔ-din], lit. 'clay pot snack') believe that in ancient times it would be cooked in a clay pot.

Khanom bodin looks like a typical butter cake, but with a denser texture and has a sweeter taste because it is made from wheat flour (or Maida flour), fresh butter and fresh milk.

The original, this type of cake is produced and eaten only among Muslims in times of significant religious traditions. At present, it is considered a rare dessert and is produced and sold only in Muslim communities of central Thailand.

In Bangkok, there are only a few bakeries in Muslim community that sell this type of dessert such as Suan Phlu Mosque in Talat Phlu area, and Maha Nak Mosque by the Khlong Maha Nak in the area of Bobae
