= Khanom farang kudi chin =

Type of Thai cake

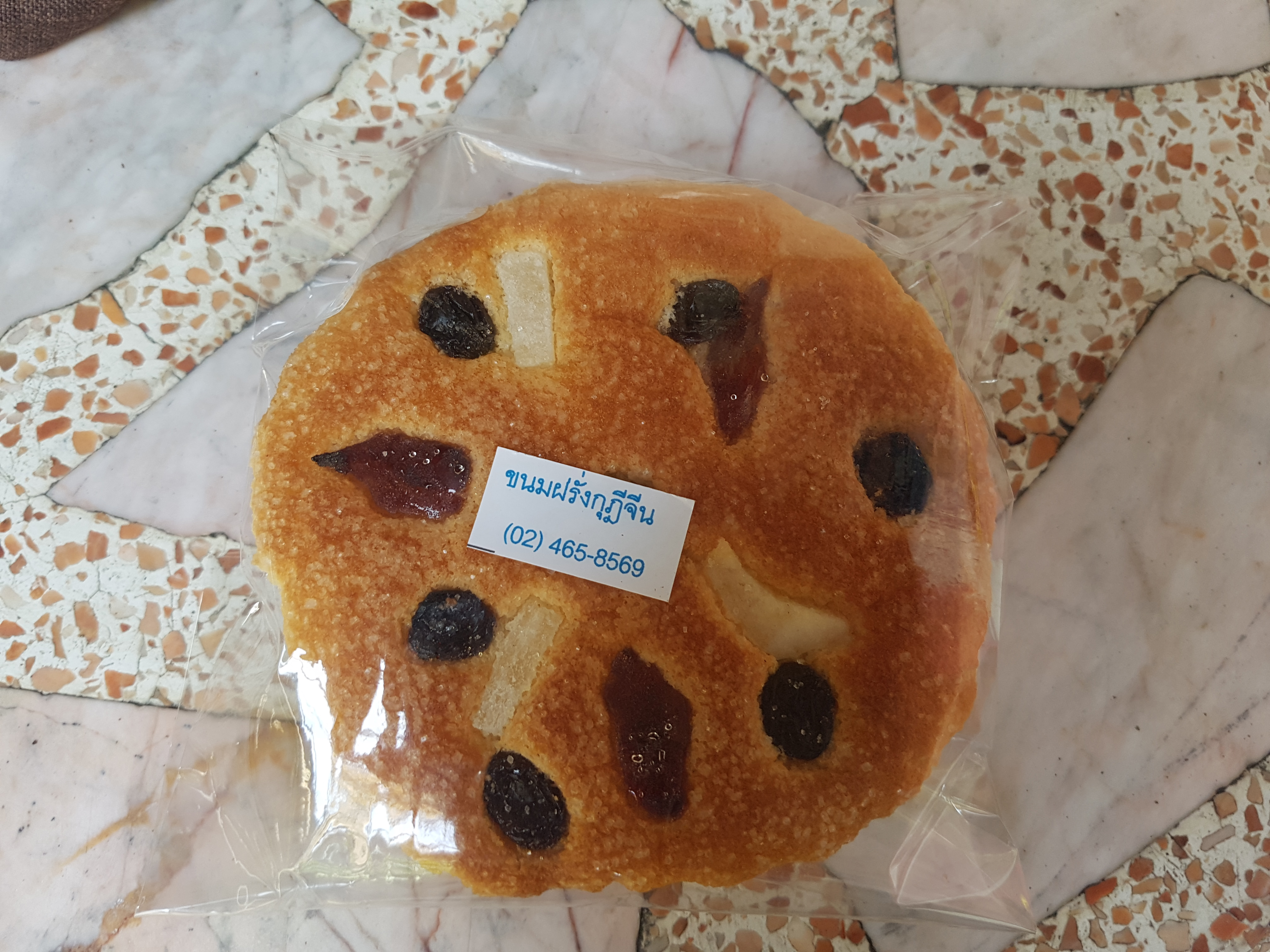
- Type: Cake
- Place of origin: Thailand
- Region or state: Kudi Chin Community, Thonburi Side, Bangkok
- Main ingredients: Duck egg, Wheat flour, White Sugar

Khanom farang kudi chin (Thai: ขนมฝรั่งกุฎีจีน, pronounced [kʰā.nǒm fā.ràŋ kū.dīː tɕīːn]) is a Thai-style cake that was influenced by Portuguese desserts since the Ayutthaya era, during the reign of King Narai (1633–88). Ayutthaya was a trading entrepot and had diplomatic relations with many European countries at the time, such as France, Spain, Holland and Portugal.

After the fall of Ayutthaya and during the reign of King Taksin (1767–82), people migrated from the former capital to the new one located on Chao Phraya's west bank (now Thonburi), which included a number of Portuguese people. They were permitted to settle there by the king and intermarry with the Thais. Their descendants are now the Thai-Portuguese at the current Kudi Chin community. To this day, they have inherited legacies from their ancestors, such as Christianity and some western traditions.

Khanom farang kudi chin is a mixture of Portuguese and Chinese cakes. It is topped with raisins, dried sweet gourds, and white sugar, which are symbols of good luck, and is made without using any baking powder or yeast.

Currently, only three families in Thailand produce this type of cake, namely Lan Mea Pao, Pa Lek, and Thanusingha Bakery House. It is considered a unique dessert of the Kudi Chin community, but it has now been widely distributed to many other places such as Bang Lamphu or Wang Lang Market.

== See also ==
- Portugal–Thailand relations
- Thai dessert
- Maria Guyomar de Pinha
- Kudi Chin
- Thong yip
- Thong yod
- Foi thong
- Khanom mo kaeng
