= List of Thai desserts and snacks =

Desserts and snacks originating from Thailand

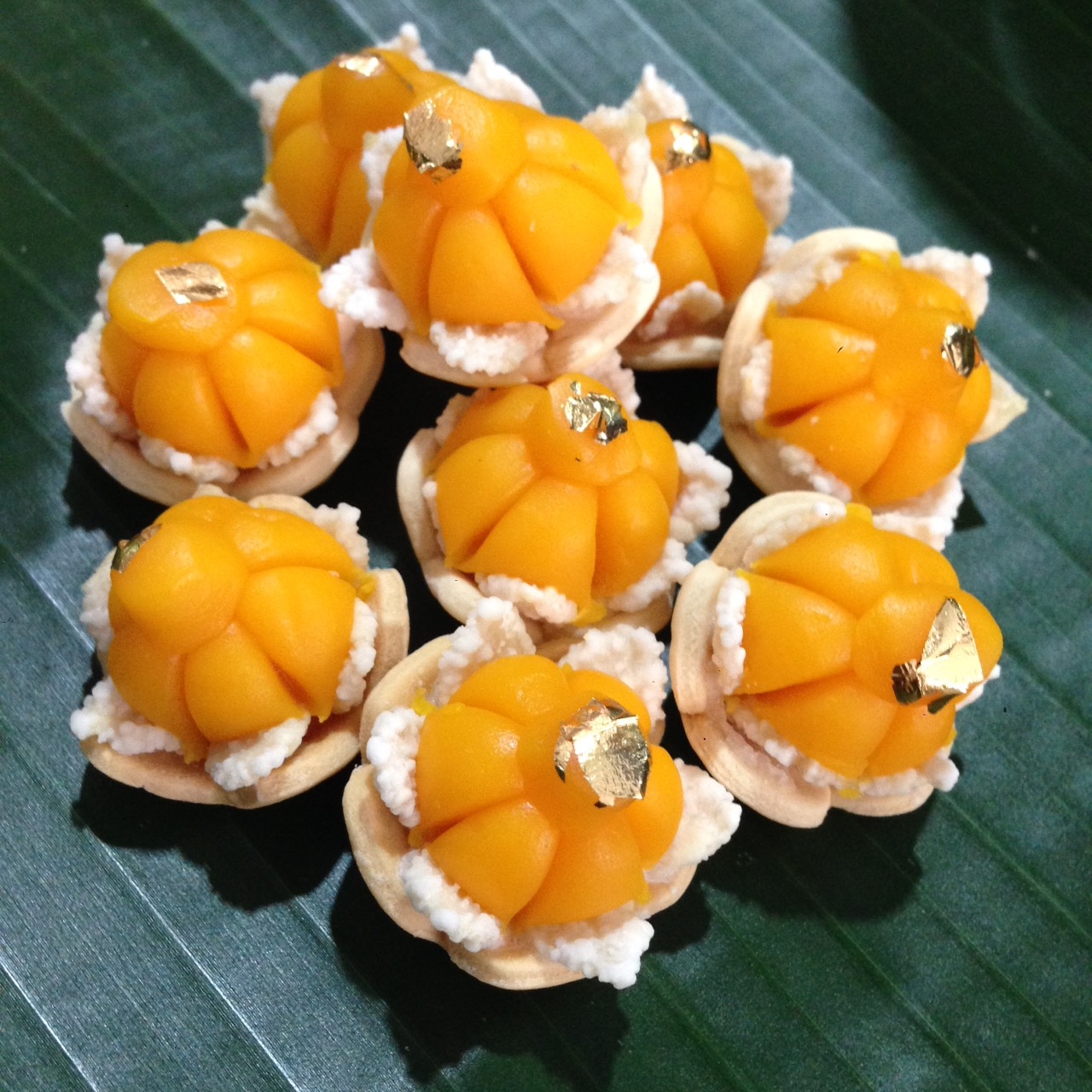
Dara thong or thong ek krachang

This is a list of Thai khanom, comprising snacks and desserts that are a part of Thai cuisine. Some of these dishes are also a part of other cuisines. The word "khanom" (Thai: ขนม), refers to snack or dessert, presumably being a compound between two words, "khao" (ข้าว), "rice" and "khnom" (หนม), "sweet". The word "khanom" in the Thai sense is snack or sweet food made from flour.

== Thai khanom ==
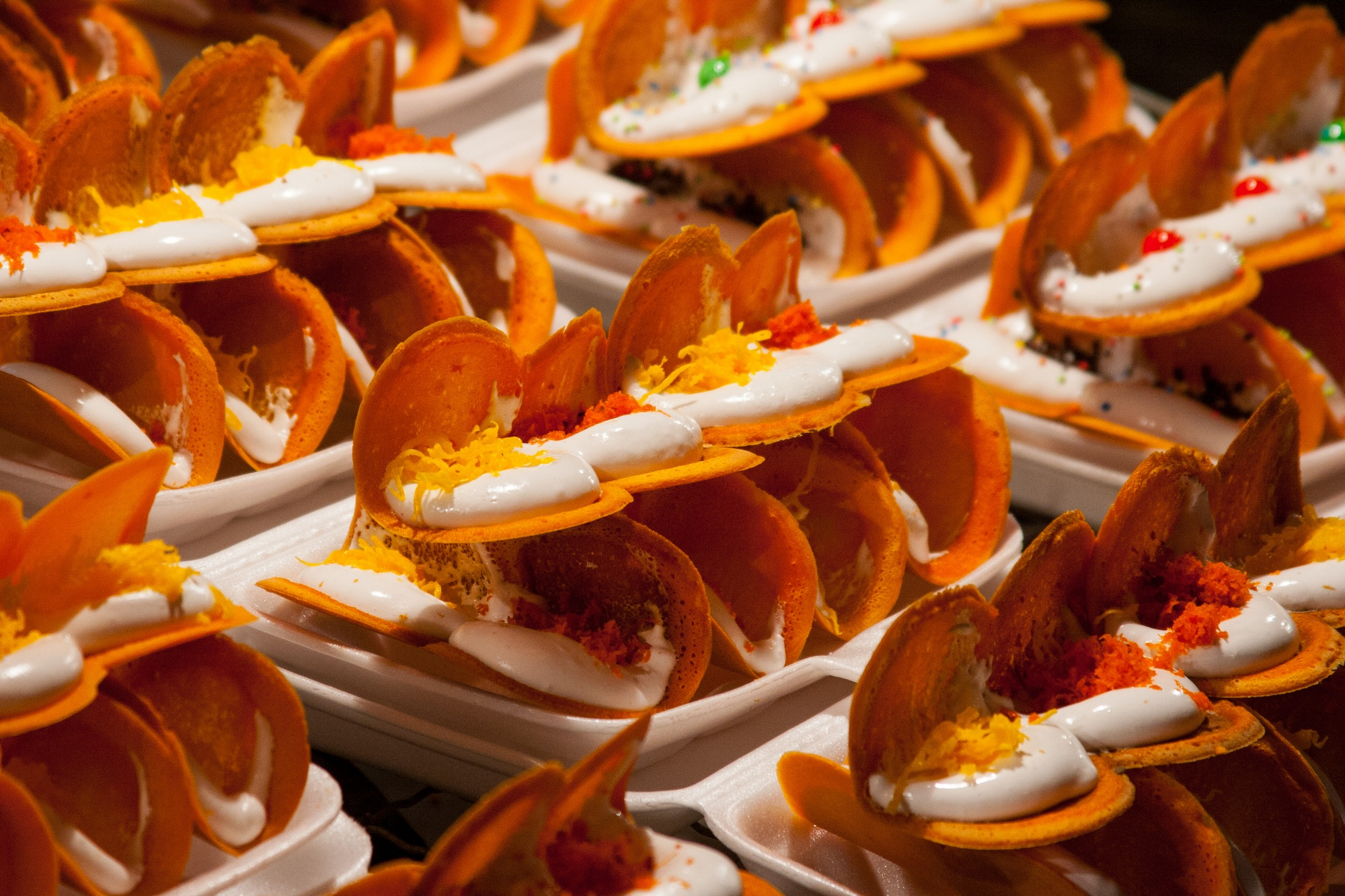
Khanom bueang

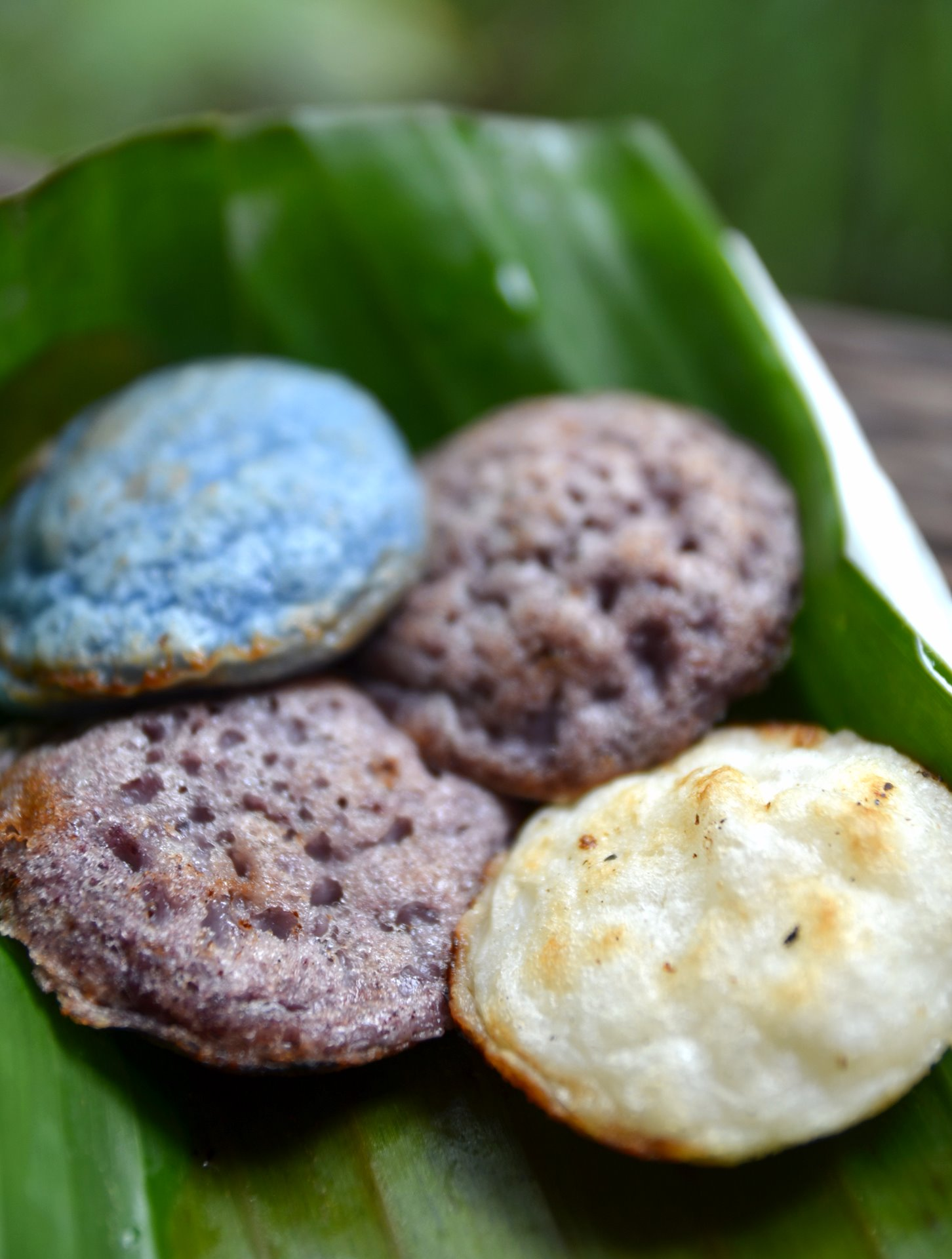
Khanom krok

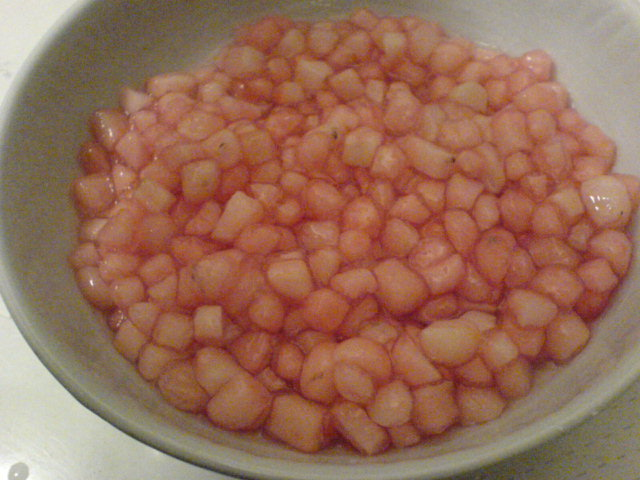
Thapthim krop

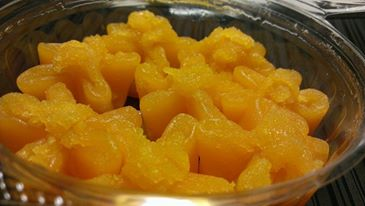
Thong yip

- Bua Loy, rice flour rolled into small balls and then cooked in coconut milk.
- Bulan dan mek
- Lot chong
- Cha mongkut
- Fakthong kaeng buat
- Foi thong
- Grass jelly
- Khanom babin
- Khanom bueang – known as Thai crêpes
- Khanom chan – means layer dessert
- Khanom keson lamchiak
- Khanom khai pla
- Khanom khi noo
- Khanom kho
- Khanom krok
- Khanom khuai ling
- Khanom mo kaeng
- Khanom namdokmai
- Khanom nuan haeo
- Khanom phing
- Khanom piakpun
- Khanom sane chan
- Khanom si thuai, "4 cups" dessert traditionally served at weddings
- Khanom sot sai
- Khanom tan
- Khanom thang taek
- Khanom thian
- Khanom tom
- Khao mak
- Khao tom
- Kluai buat chi
- Krayasat
- Luk chup
- Mango sticky rice
- Namtan pan
- Nine auspicious Thai desserts – served on special occasions such as weddings, housewarmings, or ordinations, they confer blessings on the recipient
- O-eo
- Sago with coconut milk
- Sangkhaya fakthong
- Thapthim krop
- Thong ek
- Thong yip
- Thong yot
- Thua khiao tom namtan

== See also ==
- List of desserts
- List of Thai dishes
- Maria Guyomar de Pinha – known in Thailand for having introduced new dessert recipes in Siamese cuisine at the Ayutthaya court.
