= Thong ek =

Thai dessert

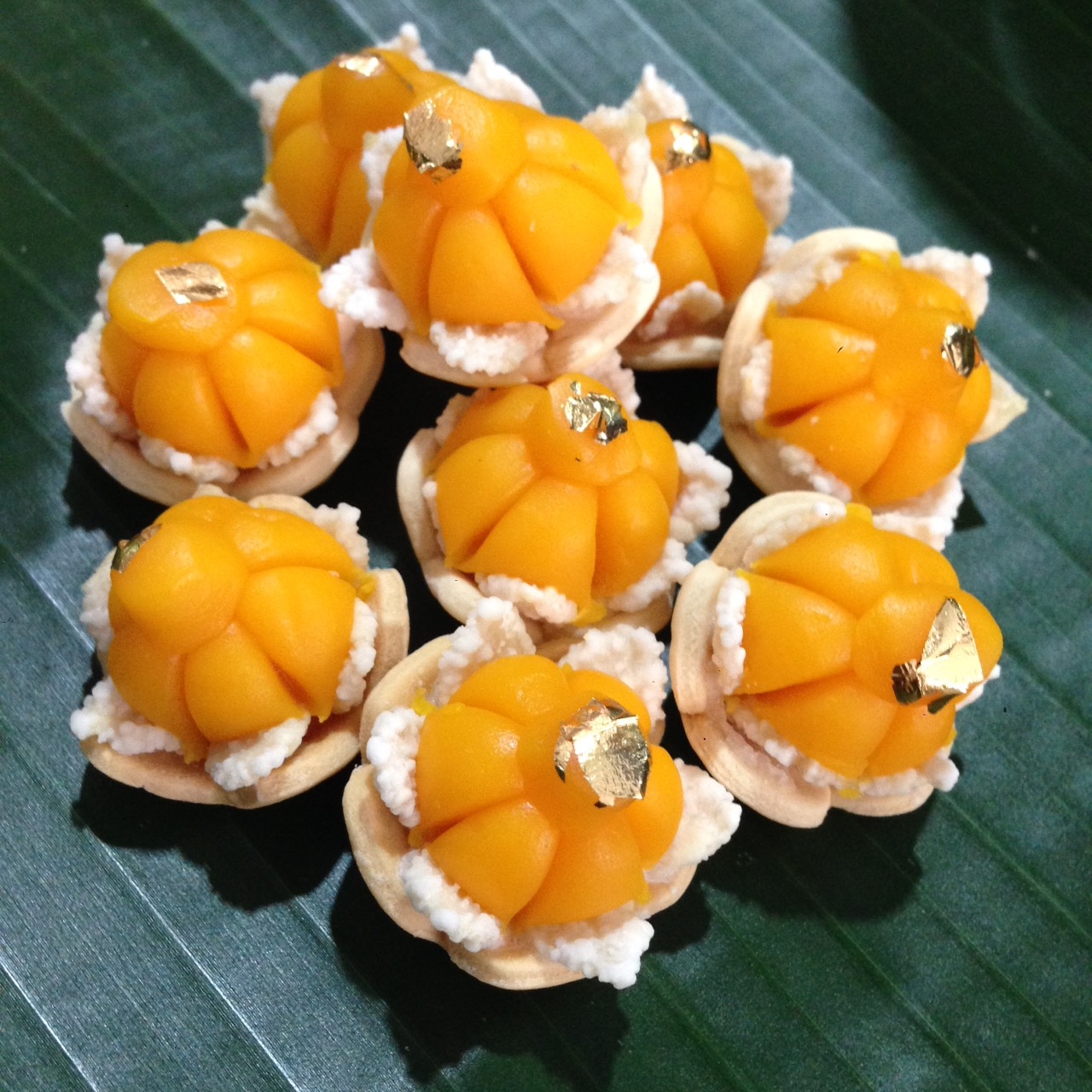
- Thong ek krachang or dara thong
- Type: Snack
- Course: Dessert
- Place of origin: Thailand
- Region or state: Southeast Asia
- Main ingredients: eggs

Thong ek (Thai: ทองเอก, pronounced [tʰɔ̄ːŋ ʔèːk]), also known as "wheat flour dumplings with egg yolks", is one of the nine auspicious traditional Thai desserts. It is a golden sweet carved as various types of flowers decorated with a piece of gold leaf on top, popularly served in very significant occasions such as career advancement ceremonies.

== Etymology ==
In Thai, the word thong means 'gold,' and the word ek means 'prime.' It is believed that when thong ek is used in auspicious rituals or given as a gift to seniors, it will bring wealth and superiority in work, helping the recipients to become number one in their field.

== History ==
Thong ek is in the same category as other egg-based sweets (i.e. thong yip, thong yot, foi thong, sangkhaya and mo kaeng). It was introduced by Japanese-Portuguese chef Maria Guyomar de Pinha in the reign of Narai during the Ayutthaya Kingdom. Its origin is a Portuguese sweet which has yolk and sugar as main ingredients. Maria Guyomar de Pinha had combined the Portuguese and Thai methods of preparing sweets, demonstrating the delicate process of cooking, starting from raw materials to the meticulous taste, color, smell, appearance and beautiful decoration, which varies according to the dessert itself.

== Ingredients ==
The dessert is made from the mixture of sugar, coconut milk and egg yolk which is pressed into wooden molds. The cooking process will not be finished until a little gold foil is decorated on the top of the sweet.

== See also ==
- List of Thai desserts
