= Khanom mo kaeng =

Thai custard dessert with coconut milk and shallots

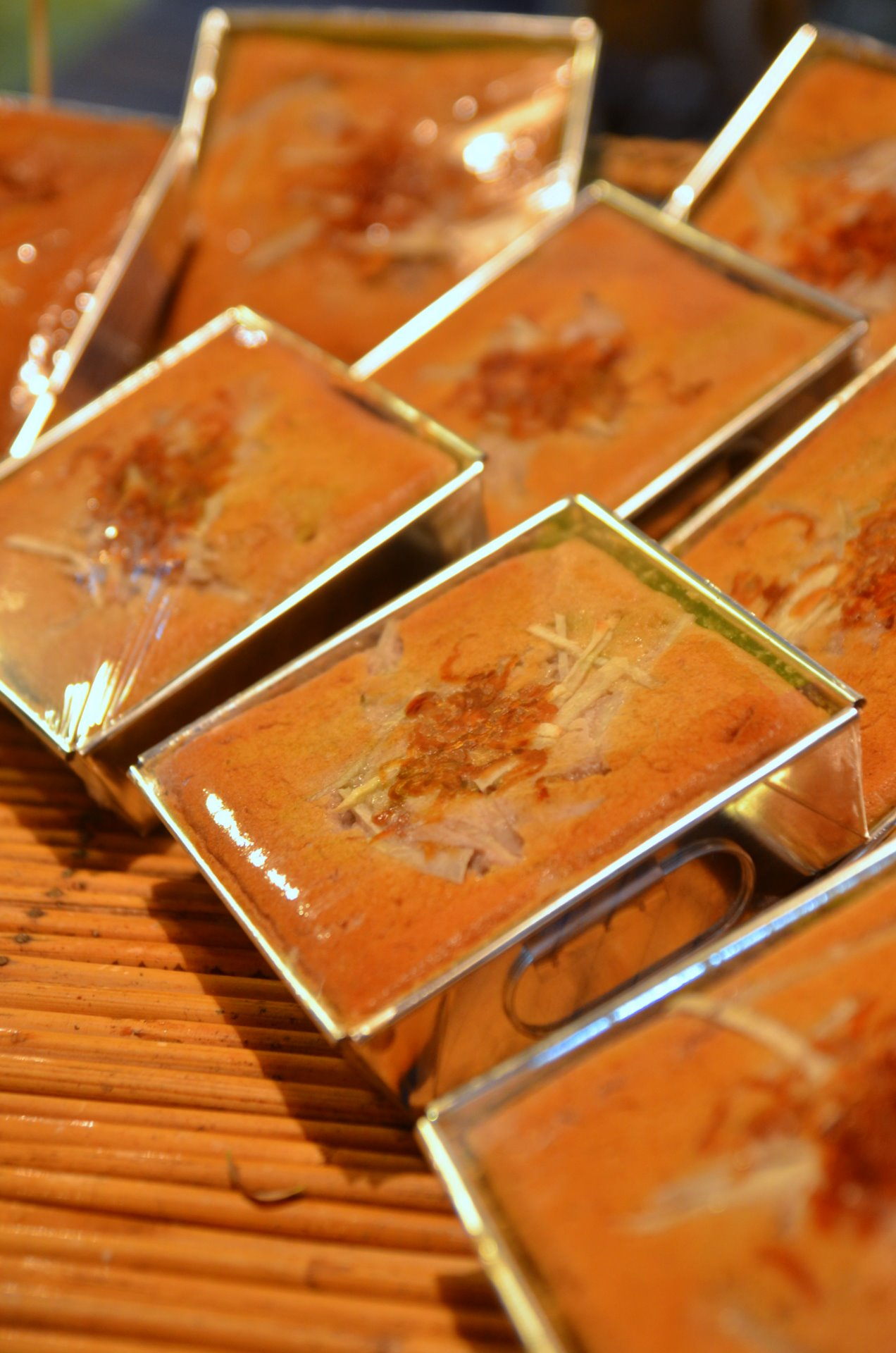
- Khanom mo kaeng
- Alternative names: Khanom kumphamat
- Type: dessert
- Place of origin: Thailand
- Main ingredients: flour, coconut milk, eggs, palm sugar, shallots
- Similar dishes: Sanwin makin

Khanom mo kaeng (Thai: ขนมหม้อแกง, pronounced [kʰānǒm mɔ̂ː kɛ̄ːŋ]) is a traditional Thai dessert. It is similar to an egg custard or a kind of flan. Khanom mo kaeng is made with coconut milk, eggs (either chicken or duck), palm sugar, white sugar, salt, shallots and a bit of oil. There are different variations of khanom mo kaeng. The kind of starch that is used is usually taros, but sometimes are used hulled mung beans, lotus seeds, sweet potatoes, or other starches.

== History ==
Maria Guyomar de Pinha was the creator of many Thai desserts during the Ayutthaya period. These desserts were influenced by Portuguese cuisine due to her mixed heritage. Some foods that she created were curry puffs, khanom mo kaeng, thong muan, thong yot, thong yip, foi thong, and khanom phing. These desserts were presented to King Narai and Princess Sudawadi, who was the daughter of King Narai. Khanom mo kaeng was served to King Narai in a pot which was made from brass.

== See also ==
- List of Thai desserts
