= Nine auspicious Thai desserts =

Used in traditional ceremonies

The nine auspicious Thai desserts are desserts used in Thailand for traditional ceremonies such as weddings or housewarmings because of their positive connotations.

Most of the dessert names include the word thong, which means 'gold' in Thai, a symbol of wealth and prosperity.

== Thong yip ==
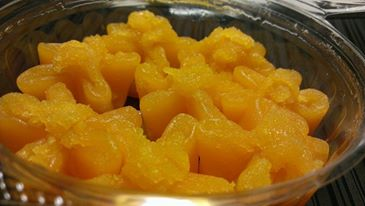
Thong Yip

Thong yip is made by mixing egg yolks and flour, which are then cooked in a syrup (sugar stewed in jasmine-scented water); each piece is then moulded into the shape of a five-pointed star, and placed in a China cup to set.

In Thai, the word thong means 'gold' and yip means 'to pick.'

== Thong yot ==
Thong yot is described as a sister of thong yip, due to the similarity in ingredients used even though the form is different. Thong yot means 'golden drop.' It augurs wealth for the person who is served it.

== Foi thong ==
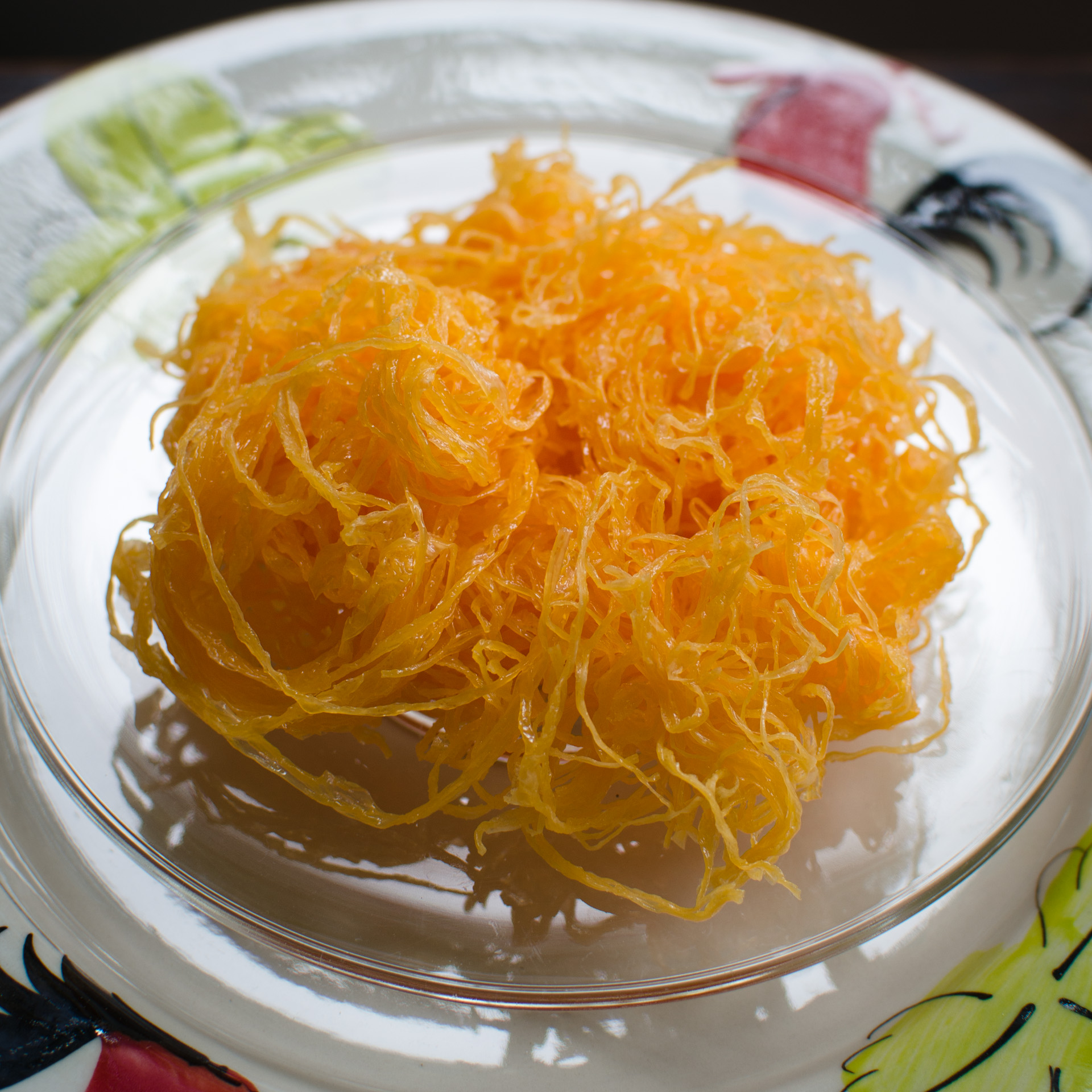
Foi thong is one of Thailand's nine auspicious desserts

Foi thong uses the same ingredients as thong yip and thong yot. Foi thong means 'golden noodle' or 'golden yarn.' It is believed to bestow long lasting love and life. It is usually used in Thai wedding ceremonies to bless the bride and groom.

== Thong ek ==
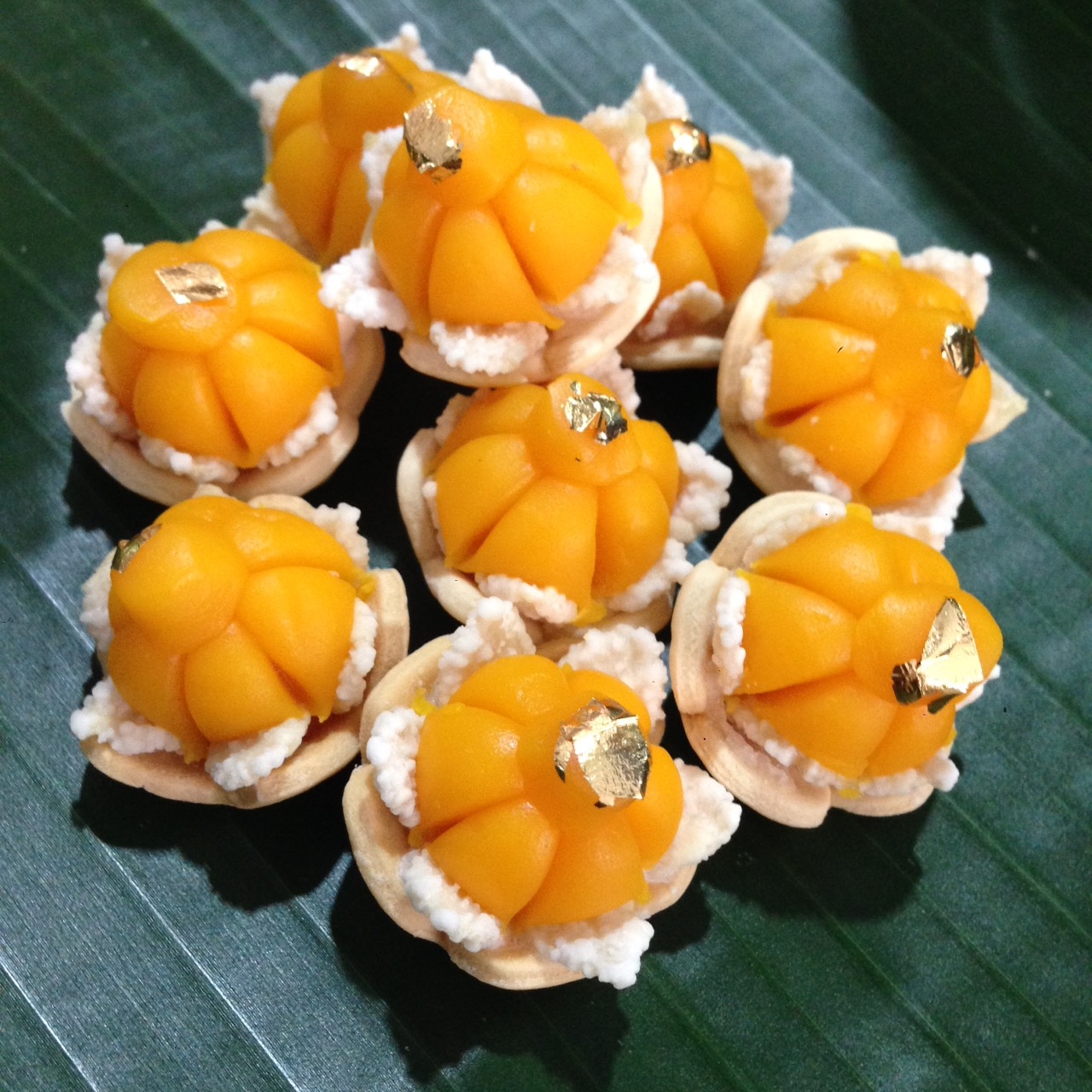
Thong ek

Thong ek is made of the same ingredients as foi thong, carved in the shape of a flower. It is said to be the most difficult and beautiful dessert of the thong desserts. Thong ek means 'the one and only,' 'tops,' 'the best.' It is conveys a blessing for a fruitful career.

== Met khanun ==
Khanom met khanun is made from mashed green bean coated with egg yolks. The name met khanun comes from its shape, which looks like jackfruit (khanun) seed (met). It symbolizes the support one will receive in one's career and in life.

== Dara thong ==
Dara thong is a crown-like dessert made of flour, egg yolk, sugar, gold leaf, roasted watermelon seeds, and jasmine-scented water, invented by Dame Jue Nakornrachaseni around 1938.

== Khanom sane chan ==
The ingredients of khanom sane chan are two kinds of flour, eggs, coconut milk, sugar, and nutmeg. Named after a fruit called luk chan, sane chan means 'charming chan.' It is believed to assure the receiver of love, adoration, and charm; mostly used in wedding ceremonies.

== Khanom chan ==
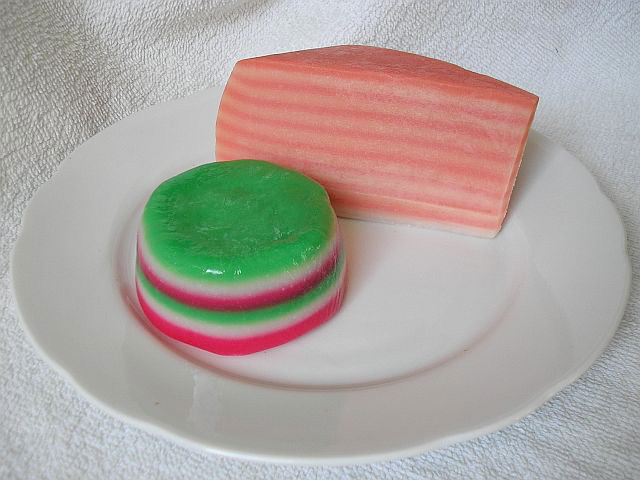
khanom chan means 'layer dessert.'

Khanom chan consists of tapioca flour, rice flour, arrowroot flour, coconut milk, sugar, and jasmine-scented water. In the past it was most commonly made by being arranged into a rose shape, but in recent times the most widespread way to make the dessert is by stacking each layer together into nine separate layers. Kanom chan literally means 'layered dessert.' It is believed to symbolize success and advancement.

== Thuai fu ==
Thuai fu is made of flour, sugar, yeast, and jasmine-scented water. Thuai fu is named after its shape. It means 'rising bowl,' and is said to symbolize improvement in life and career

== See also ==
- List of Thai desserts
- Thai cuisine § Desserts and sweets
