= Thong muan sot =

Thai foodstuff

Thong muan sot (Thai: ทองม้วนสด, pronounced [tʰɔ̄ːŋ múa̯n sòt]) is a Thai snack. It is also known as Thai fresh rolled wafer. It contains the combination of the sweetness from coconut sugar, the saltiness and the mild scent from coconut milk, the soft texture of coconut meat and a little bit of crispness from roasted black sesame. Originally, it has pale-yellow color. In some recipes, thong muan sot is greenish, as of the added Pandan into the mixture to make it more scented and sweet.

The dessert is said to be created since the Ayutthaya era (1350–1767), "Since the Ayutthaya era, Thailand developed relationship with many countries in both the west and the east. Thailand gained new innovations and cultures including snacks and desserts. Most of them were influenced by the Portuguese but they were altered to fit in the initial Thai culture" (The History of Tong Muan sot, Tong Muan sot, n.d., para1). Thong muan sot is the adapted version of thong muan or Thai crispy roll, to be more sticky and softer. The prices range between 20 THB to 40 THB per one serving. One pack of thong muan sot usually contains 6 rolls. It is a traditional Thai dessert, so it can be found in street food markets and Thai local markets.

Thong muan sot creates jobs and increases income for local Thai people because it is quite easy to make and the ingredients are available in all parts of Thailand (Tong Muan sot With Soft Coconut Meat Is Also Salable, 2013, para1). Firstly, it was known as a famous dessert from Kanchanaburi, then it expanded widely to other provinces and became the OTOP (One Tambon One Product) product of Bangkok in 2006 (OTOP Products Information, Tong Muan sot., n.d., para1) and Nakhon Nayok in 2010 (OTOP Products E-Commerce, Tong Muan sot., n.d., para1)
