= Bulan dan mek =

Thai dessert

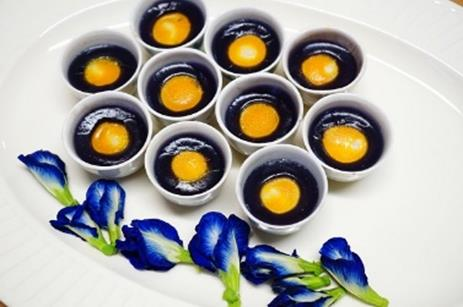
- Bulan dan mek
- Type: Thai dessert
- Place of origin: Thailand
- Main ingredients: Flour, sugar, eggs, salt and other fillings

Bulan dan mek (Thai: บุหลันดั้นเมฆ, pronounced [bū.lǎn dân mêːk]) is one of the traditional Thai desserts inspired by royal songs in the reign of King Rama II of Chakri Dynasty, 1767-1824. It is a small dessert in which the center is a circular dimple with a yellow color and a bluish-purple surrounding skin.

== History ==
Bulan dan mek is a royal Thai dessert that has been invented. It means the moon floating among the clouds. The appearance of the dessert uses butterfly pea flower juice instead of the color of the clouds at night, and the word "bulan" means the moon will use an egg yolk placed in the middle to imitate the moon floating prominently in the night sky.

Bulan dan mek was inspired by the song "Bulan Loi Luean" which is a royal song written from the dream story of King Rama II, 1767-1824. According to the history of this song, it is said that after he was playing fiddle (ซอสายฟ้าฟาด, ซอสามสาย) until late at night, he fell asleep. He dreamed that he had gone to a very beautiful place. The full moon gradually drifts closer along with the clairvoyant sound. The King, who was an accomplished musician himself, looked and listened to the beautiful music. Then, the moon gradually drifted away in the sky, the sound of music gradually faded away. Upon waking up, the sound of the music in the dream still rang in his ears. The king, remembering the piece, had the court musicians arranged the song after his recollection, and bestowed the name of the song as "Bulan Loi Luean"

== Ingredients ==
The ingredients of bulan dan mek are divided into 2 main parts. The first part is the flour mixture, namely rice flour, arrowroot powder or alternatively tapioca starch, butterfly pea flower juice or use food coloring, caster sugar, coconut milk, and salt may be added. The second part is the ingredients of the filling such as egg yolk, sugar, salt, and coconut milk can be added to make custard filling or use thong yot (ทองหยอด) paste instead. Bulan dan mek may have slightly different ingredients in each area. But using the standard part is rice flour, sugar, coconut milk, and egg. All recipes can be used to make bulan dan mek as well.

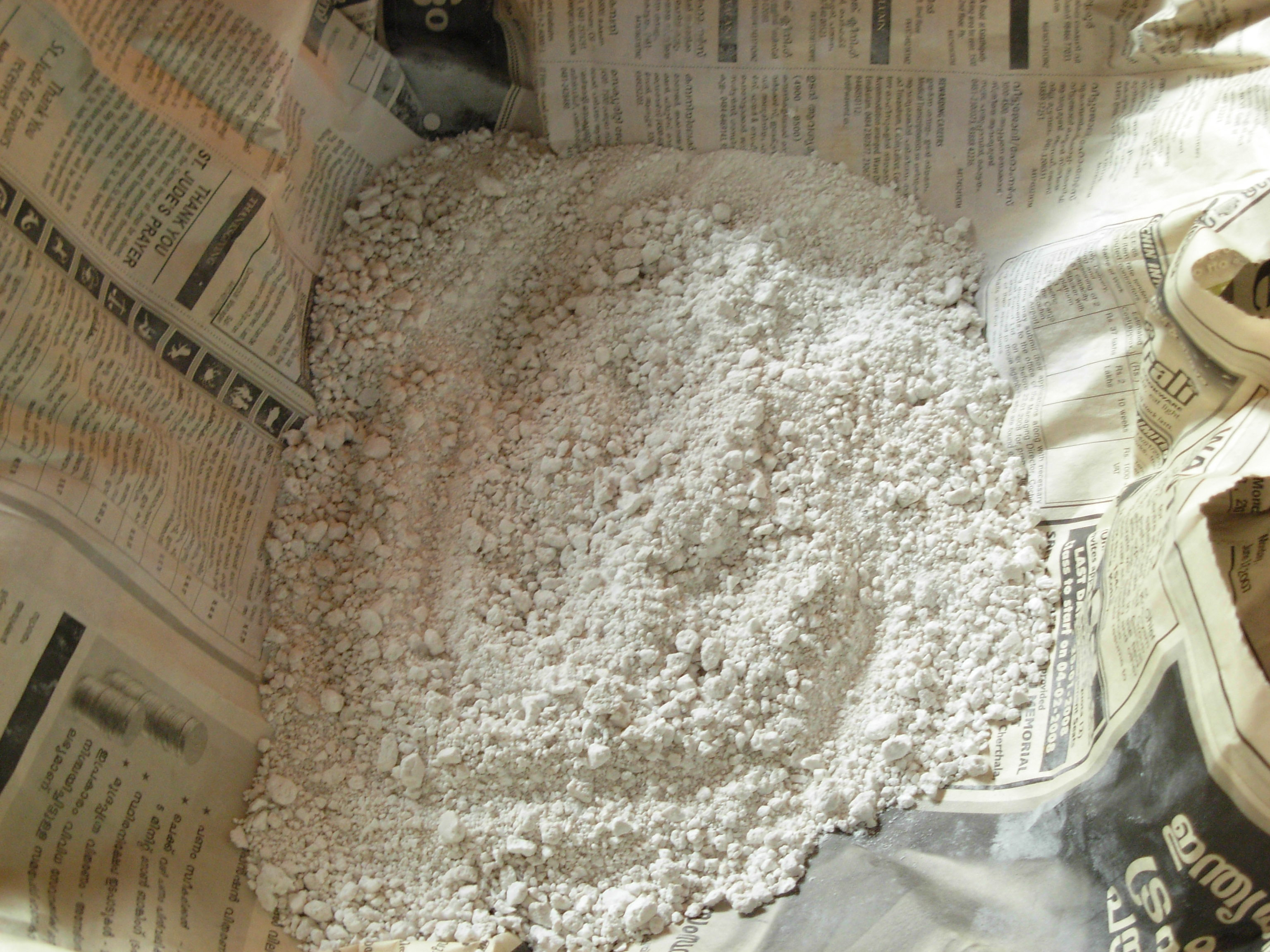
Arrowroot powder

Flour mixture

- 60 grams of rice flour
- Arrowroot powder 1 ½ tablespoon
- 70 grams of water
- 40 grams of caster sugar
- Butterfly pea flower juice, boiled 170 g.

Ingredients of the filling

- 1 egg yolk
- 14 grams of white sugar
- ¼ tablespoon of salt
- 30 grams of coconut milk

== Equipment ==
Originally, bulan dan mek was baked in pottery cups. It requires specific equipment to make. In the past, they used Sangkhalok ceramic wares, which were small cups made from pottery called pinwheel cups. Pinwheel cups come in a variety of sizes. Slightly different sizes are considered "standard" in different countries. Other cups that are small and heat resistant and can be baked in a steamer are sometimes used instead.

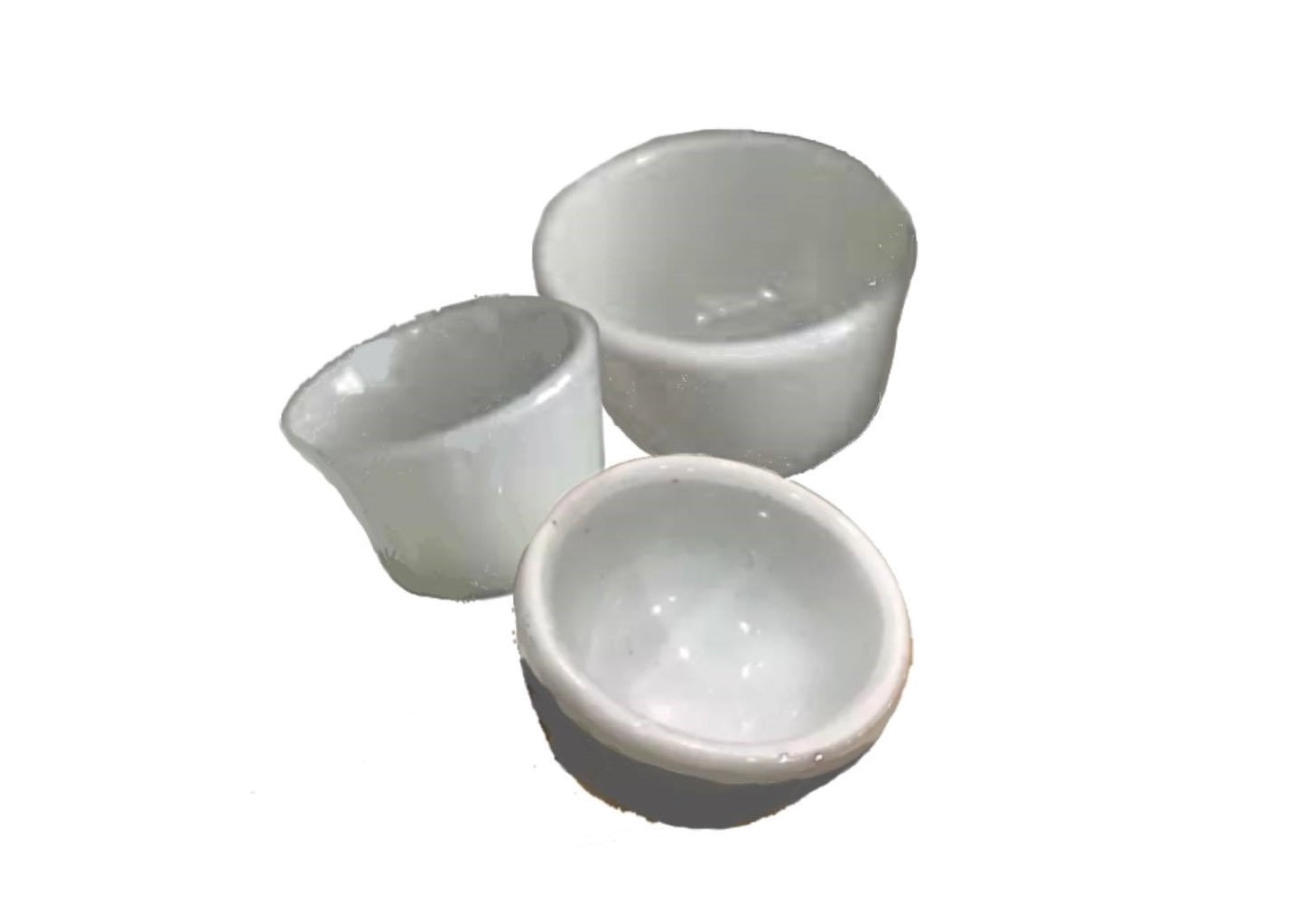
Pinwheel cups

- Small pinwheel cup (can use a small, heat-resistant cup)
- Steamer
- Measuring cup
- Bowl
- Tablespoon
- Teaspoon
- Spatula
- Egg whisk
- Spoon
