= Khanom keson lamchiak =

Thai dessert

- Alternative names: Khanom dok lamchiak (ขนมดอกลำเจียก)
- Type: Thai dessert
- Place of origin: Thailand
- Region or state: central Thailand
- Created by: Thai people
- Main ingredients: Glutinous rice flour, sugar, sweet cream (made from glutinous rice flour stirred with coconut and sugar)
- Other information: Bunga-kuda

Khanom keson lamchiak (Thai: ขนมเกสรลำเจียก, pronounced [kʰā.nǒm kēː.sɔ̌ːn lām.t͡ɕìa̯k]) is a kind of Thai dessert. It can be considered as a rare and little known dessert.

This kind of dessert was often cooked and used in various auspicious occasions in the past. Khanom keson lamchiak is shaped like a Khanom Tokyo, that is, it is a thin flat flour filled with sweet cream.

Khanom keson lamchiak has only three ingredients include glutinous rice, sugar and coconut. It is cooked using glutinous rice flour mixed with coconut milk, sift through a sieve on hot pan, then filled with glutinous rice flour stirred with coconut and sugar, and roll into a long thin sheet as the final step.

If eaten while still hot, will get the aroma of dessert, hence the name khanom keson lamchiak, literally "pandanus pollen snack"

This kind of dessert is assumed to have originated since the early Rattanakosin period. Based on the evidence mentioned in the poem Kap He Chom Khrueang Khao Wan, a work of King Rama II. It is believed that there is a source that is Samut Songkhram, which was his birthplace.

Khanom keson lamchiak is also similar to Bunga-kuda, a local dessert of Satun and Malay Peninsula.

Currently, there are only a few places that still make and sell this kind of dessert, such as Chumchon Khanom Plaek of Chanthaburi, San Chao Rong Thong Old Market in Ang Thong, and was chosen to be One Tambon One Product (OTOP) of Samut Prakan etc.

== See also ==
- List of Thai desserts and snacks
