= Khanom namdokmai =

Thai dessert

Khanom Nam Dok Mai (Thai: ขนมน้ำดอกไม้ or ขนมชักหน้า, English: Thai Jasmine Scented Sweets) is Thai dessert that has identical is smell of jasmine floats in the water. We use Jasmine in the morning frozen cooked boiled water into the cold water dip stick in it and keep the lid closed 1 night then dawn filter apply to baking. The colors of Khanom Nam Dok Mai are from nature, for example, green from Pandan leaves or blue from Butterfly pea.

== See also ==
- List of Thai desserts
