= Khanom met khanun =

Thai dessert

- Type: Dessert, snack, finger food
- Place of origin: Thailand
- Region or state: Southeast Asia
- Created by: Thai people
- Main ingredients: Dehulled cooked bean, Egg yolks, sugar, coconut milk
- Food energy (per 100 g serving): 347 kcal (1,450 kJ)
Nutritional value
(per 100 g serving)
- Protein: 11 g
- Fat: 11 g
- Carbohydrate: 51 g

Khanom met khanun (alternative spelled: med khanoon, med khanun, met khanoon; Thai: ขนมเม็ดขนุน) is traditional Thai dessert dating back to the Ayutthaya period. It is made from a mixture of sweet cooked bean and coconut paste, which is dipped in blended egg yolk and then dipped in hot syrup. The dessert has a yellow-golden appearance and is a bit soft and sticky when chewed. It is one of the nine auspicious Thai desserts served in Thai wedding traditions (khan mak parade), religious observances and as a snack.

The technique of making khanom met khanun was influenced by Portuguese confectioners living in the European enclave in Siam after their arrival in 1516 AD in the reign of King Ramathibodi II of Ayutthaya. The Siamese people eventually adapted it into a Siamese dessert, especially after the arrival of Maria Guyomar de Pinha in Siam. She popularized the use of egg and sugar as major ingredients in desserts in the reign of King Narai The Great.

== Etymology ==
The term met khanun is a Thai word. The word met (เม็ด) means 'stone, seed' and the word khanun (ขนุน) means 'jackfruit.' The term met khanun in Thai cuisines refers to a sweet, golden Thai dessert with an elliptical shape and a round lump, resembling a jackfruit seed. It is also associated with the belief of being successful in life and work when served in Thai traditions.

Alternative names for met khanun in English include "mock jackfruit seeds," "golden bean paste," "golden jackfruit seeds," "Thai jackfruit seed dessert," "mung bean yolks" and "Thai mung bean marzipan."
