= Khanom khi noo =

Khanom khi noo (Thai: ขนมขี้หนู, pronounced [kʰā.nŏm kʰîː nŭː]), otherwise known as Khanom sai (ขนมทราย, pronounced [kʰā.nŏm sǎːj]) is a traditional Thai dessert with a distinctive character. The sweets are small, delicate, and crumbly, made from rice flour. They are brightly coloured, mostly green and pink, and are baked with the fragrance of jasmine or ylang-ylang, or with incense smoke. They are served with shredded coconut sprinkled on top.

Nowadays, Khanom khi noo has become harder to find because its preparation is quite complicated and delicate, requiring great care. To achieve the best taste, the texture of the sweets must be soft, not too hard or too mushy.

In 2025, Khanom khi noo was declared "The Lost Taste of Bangkok" under the Ministry of Culture's "One Province, One Menu" project, recognising local dishes that are increasingly rare.
