= Khanom Si Thuai =

Traditional Thai dessert

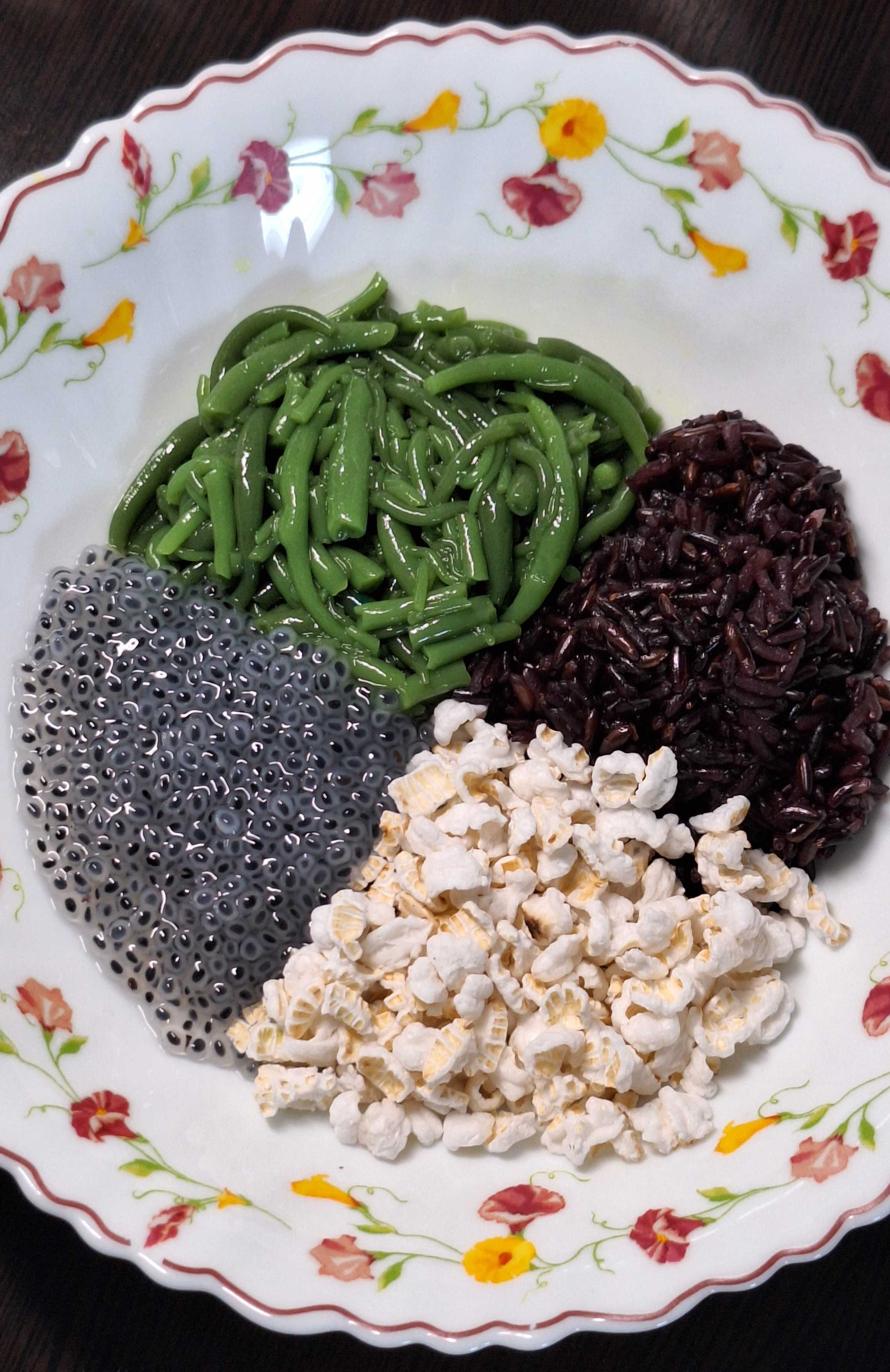
A traditional Khanom Si Thuai set consists of four different sweets in Thailand.

Khanom Si Thuai (Thai: ขนมสี่ถ้วย; pronounced /kʰà.nǒm sìː tʰûaj/; literally “four-cup dessert”) is a traditional Thai dessert consisting of four sweet dishes served together in cups or bowls. Each cup represents a different type of sweet, including black sticky rice, popped rice, basil seed, and green jelly-like noodles or Lod Chong in coconut milk. The dessert symbolizes good fortune, harmony, and lasting love, and is an important part of Thai wedding ceremonies.

== History ==
Khanom Si Thuai is believed to have originated during the Sukhothai period, when desserts made from rice, coconut, and sugar became central to Thai festive culture. Historical accounts suggest that the dessert was created as part of wedding rituals, where families exchanged or shared four types of sweets to symbolize happiness and unity.

During the Ayutthaya period, the tradition of serving four-cup dessert at weddings became more widespread among both noble and common families. Over time, local variations appeared across different regions of Thailand.

The “four cups” concept is connected to the phrase “kin si thuai” (eat four cups), referring to the symbolic sharing of four sweets during a wedding ceremony, representing love, stability, and good fortune in married life. The dessert is an offering to the ancestors of both families.

== Cultural significance ==
Khanom Si Thuai carries deep cultural meaning in Thai society. Traditionally, it is served during wedding ceremonies as part of the “kin si thuai” ritual, where the bride and groom share the four sweets to wish for eternal love and mutual respect. Each sweet has its own symbolic meaning: basil seed symbolizes fertility and growth, Lod Chong stand for smoothness and happiness in marriage, popped rice reflects joy and prosperity, black sticky rice represents lasting love and faithfulness.

In modern Thai culture, Khanom Si Thuai remains a symbol of affection and goodwill and is still offered during some weddings as a symbol of love shared between families and communities.

== Ingredients ==
The four traditional sweets that make up Khanom Si Thuai usually include basil seeds (ไข่กบ), Lod Chong (นกปล่อย) or green rice flour noodles in coconut milk, crispy popped rice (นางลอย หรือมะลิลอย), and black sticky rice (อ้ายตื้อ). Each sweet is prepared separately and later arranged together in small cups or bowls. The basil seeds are soaked until swollen and translucent. Lod Chong is made from rice flour mixed with pandan leaf water which is stirred over low heat until the flour is smooth and cooked, then pressed through a sieve and served with sweet coconut milk. The popped rice is roasted over low heat until the grains puff up, creating a light and crispy texture, and the black sticky rice is cooked glutinous rice served with coconut milk to achieve a soft consistency and rich flavor.

Coconut milk, sugar, and rice flour are shared ingredients among the four cups, providing a consistent sweetness and fragrant aroma. Once all four components are ready, they are placed together to form the “four cups” set that gives Khanom Si Thuai its name. The dessert is usually served at room temperature or slightly chilled and put together before serving.

== See also ==
- Thai desserts
- Thai cuisine
- List of Thai desserts and snacks
