= Kluai buat chi =

Thai dessert

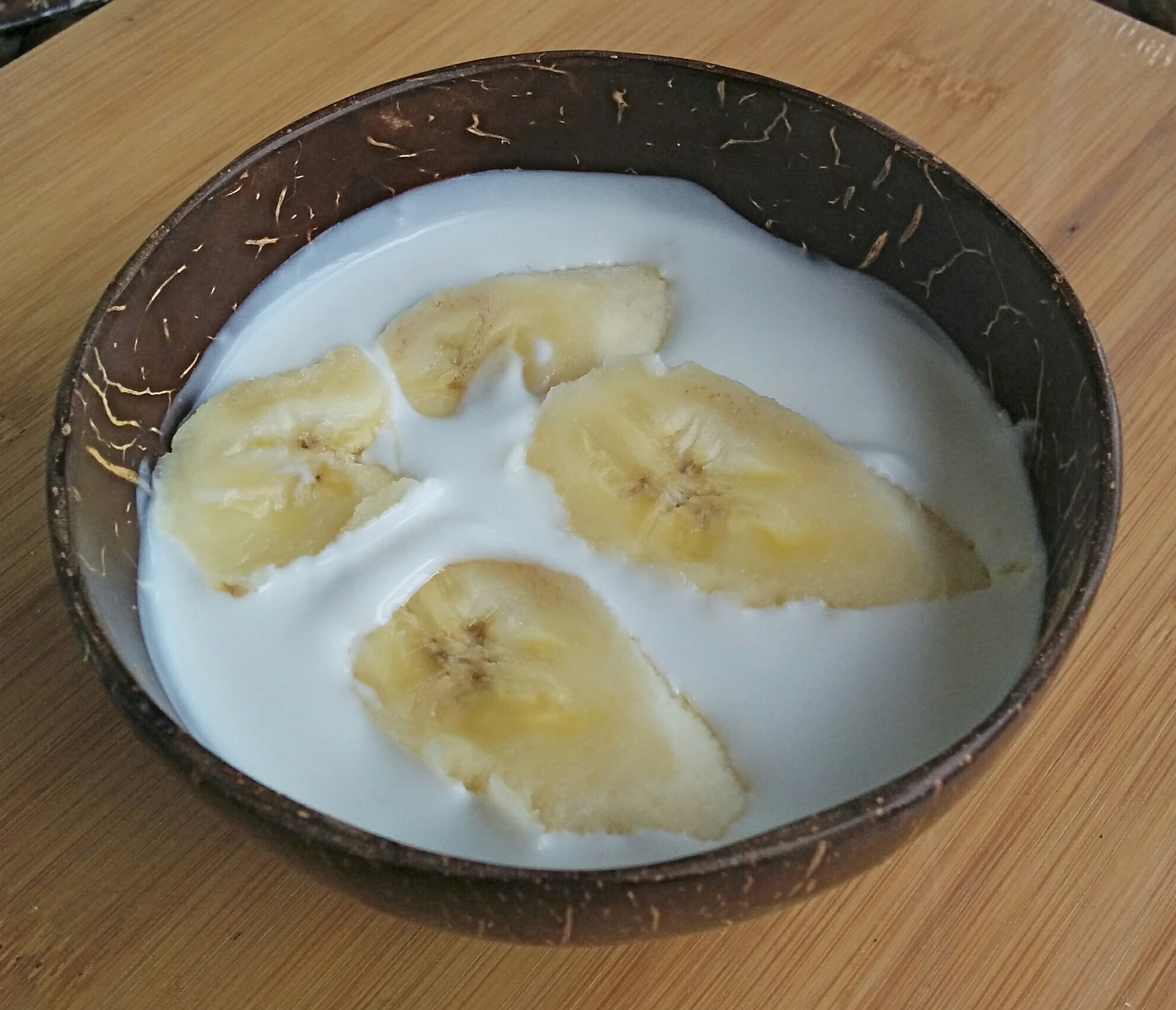
- Kluai buat chi
- Type: Desserts
- Region or state: Thailand
- Main ingredients: bananas, coconut milk, sugar, salt

Kluai buat chi or banana in coconut milk (Thai: กล้วยบวชชี, pronounced [klûa̯j bùa̯t t͡ɕʰīː]) is a Thai dessert. Bananas are simply cooked in a mixture of coconut milk and coconut cream to create a flavorful dessert. Usually, Kluai buat chi is composed of two batters, one salty and one sweet, both of which are cooked in a pot.

The dessert is widely served throughout Thailand and is popular in neighboring countries such as Myanmar, Laos, Cambodia, and Malaysia. It may be served hot or cold.

== Etymology ==
The phrase buat chi in Thai may refer to the white clothing worn by a woman entering a sisterhood, a similar color palette to kluai buat chi.

== See also ==
- List of Thai desserts
- List of desserts
- Thai cuisine
