= Namtan pan =

Traditional Thai candy

Namtan pan (Thai: น้ำตาลปั้น, pronounced [nám.tāːn pân], "sculpted sugar") is a traditional Thai candy. It comes in many colors and shapes, such as monkeys, dragons, flowers, and fruits. It depends on the creativity of makers. Namtan pan derives its name from the process in which it is made.

Traditionally, namtan pan was usually made and sold at Chinese opera theatres by Teochew immigrants, who may have introduced the sweet into Thailand. The vendors would use a foldaway tool set consisting of a working bench, pots and stove to make and sell their products. But others presume that it is Thai ingenuity that made the foldaway tool and existed when there was a temple fair. (Kumorng, 2010)

Twenty years ago, namtan pan could be commonly found at temple fairs and festivals. However, its popularity has since largely declined, in part due to changing societal values and concerns about hygiene and ingredient safety. Few people now wish to make a living selling namtan pan, a craft that requires patience and creative skill. The syrup has to be boiled for days, then moulded into shapes by hand when hot. Although it requires much effort and is fading, Namtarn Paan can show the story about Thai wisdom, the old memory from the past and the story behind the sculpting of Namtarn Paan that reveals the thoughts of the maker.

Thai people who live naturally and self-sufficiently showed their ingenuity, when they got the reed (Ton-aor = ต้นอ้อ) in the forest for sugar skewers and the mould from baked clay. They have to simmer the sugar day by day. Namtarn Paan’s foldaway tool has embers under the tray of sugar since Namtarn Paan’s makers have to sculpt a shape and form it when it is still hot. When it cools down, it will be hard. To create the Namtarn Paan sculpture, makers have to follow the trends like common cartoon characters, dolls or produce for events, such as flowers on Valentine’s Day for teenagers to buy for their lover. The image of Namtarn Paan attracts children and provokes the old memories of adults to take the Namtarn Paan as a memento.

== See also ==
- List of Thai desserts
- Sugar painting
