= Khanom thian =

Thai foodstuff

Khanom thian (Thai: ขนมเทียน, pronounced [kʰā.nǒm tʰīa̯n]; 'candle pudding or pastry') is a type of Thai khanom (snack or dessert) prepared in the shape of a candle. It originated in northern Thailand, and is used by some people as a ceremonial dish.

== Overview ==
Khanom thian is a pudding or pastry prepared using rice flour or corn flour, coconut milk that has been sweetened, such as with brown sugar, and sesame seeds. Salt is also sometimes used as an ingredient. The mixture is then steamed in banana leaves formed into an enclosed packet shaped like a cone. After being cooked, its color is similar to that of molasses. It is sometimes garnished with shredded coconut.

== History ==
The dish originated in the northernmost part of Thailand. Khanom thian has been described as a "ceremonial pudding", and the dish is used as an offering by Chinese Thais to their ancestors during New Year's Eve ceremonies. After the ceremonial offering, khanom thian is given to friends and relatives as a gift.

== See also ==
- List of Thai khanom
- Thai cuisine
