= Krayasat =

Thai dessert

Krayasat (Thai: กระยาสารท, pronounced [krā.jāː.sàːt]; food for the Sat Rite), is a Thai dessert prepared for Buddhist religious events. It is commonly served during the Festival of Offerings to the Dead, a Thai holiday. It is made from peanuts, sugar cane, sticky rice, sesame and coconut. Krayasat is similar in appearance to a granola bar, but with a sweeter taste and very sticky.

== Festival of Offerings to the Dead ==
Krayasat is traditionally served at the Festival of Offerings to the Dead, which is held on the new moon at the end of the tenth lunar month. It is an occasion for making merit by honoring (บูชา buucha), the spirits of the season, as well as deceased relatives.

== Ritual practices ==
Krayasatit is offered to the monks on sat Day. At the end of the offering, a ceremony is performed by pouring water of dedication in order to transfer merit to other beings. It is believed that if people do not offer Krayasat to monks, their dead relatives will have nothing to eat and they will thus have no gratitude towards their benefactors.

== Ingredients ==
Krayasat is made from a combination of peanuts, sugar cane, sticky rice, sesame, and coconut cooked into a sticky paste and then wrapped with a banana leaf.

== See also ==
- List of Thai desserts
