= Thua khiao tom namtan =

Thai dessert

Thua khiao tom namtan (Thai: ถั่วเขียวต้มน้ำตาล, pronounced [tʰùa̯ kʰǐa̯w tôm nám.tāːn]) is a Thai dessert made from mung beans.

== Ingredients ==
Thua khiao tom namtan is a simple dessert cooked with 5 ingredients

- mung beans
- palm sugar
- granulated sugar
- water
- salt

== See also ==
- List of Thai desserts
