= Kanom piakpoon =

Thai dessert

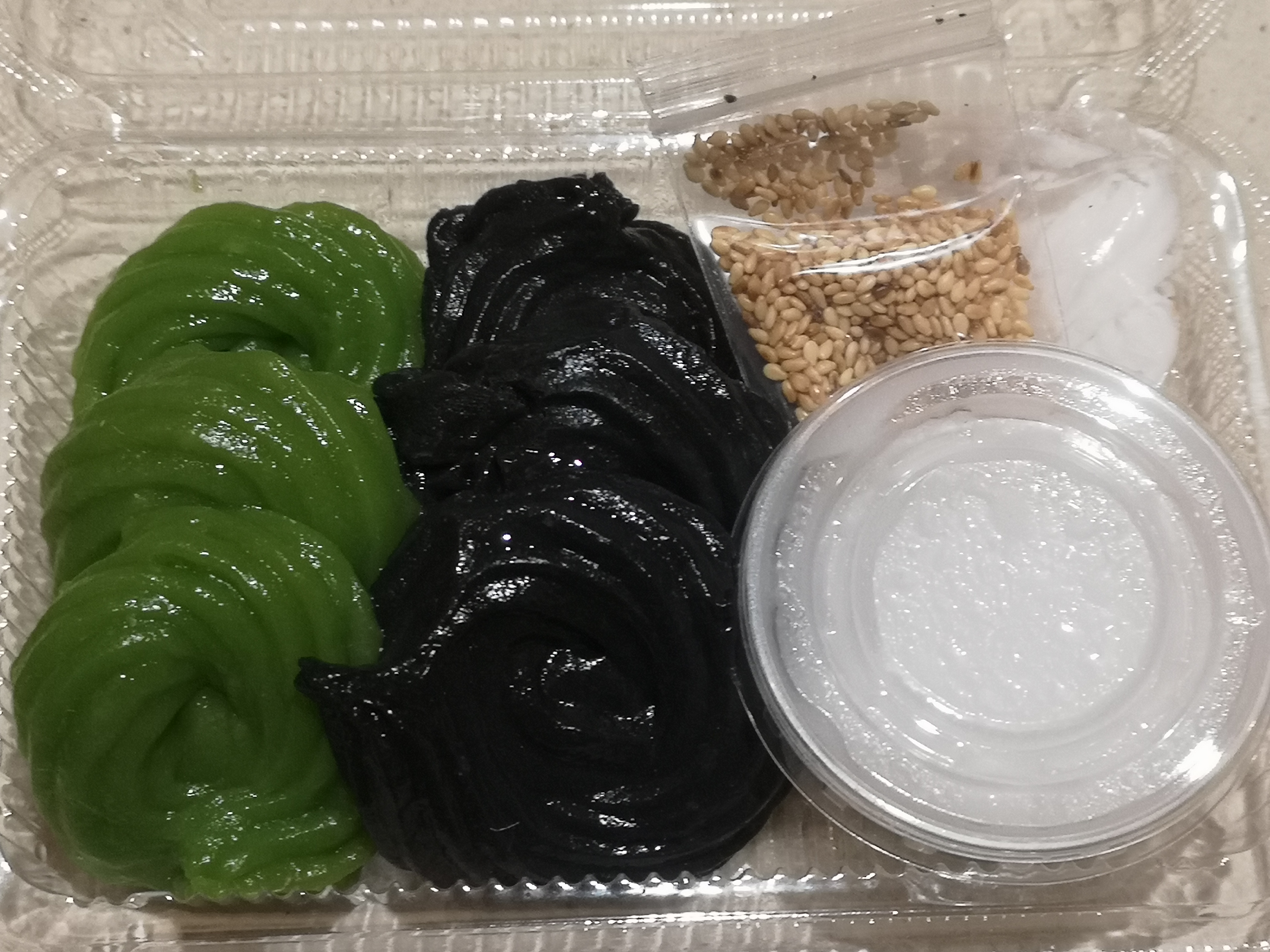
Kanom piak pun

Khanom piak pun (Thai: ขนมเปียกปูน, Thai pronunciation: [kʰā.nǒm pìa̯k pūːn]; lit. 'limewater-dampened sweets') is a type of Thai dessert. It is similar in texture to khanom chan, despite being different in appearance. Khanom chan can be peeled into layers, while khanom piak pun is solid throughout.

== History ==
There is no concrete evidence of when Khanom Piak poon was first invented. It is only speculated that it was made from the wisdom of our ancestors, who adapted the recipe from Khanom Gwan (ขนมกวน; RTGS: khanom kuan; Thai pronunciation: [kʰā.nǒm.kua̯n]) or Kalamae (กาละแม; RTGS: kalamae; Thai pronunciation: [Kālamæ]) to create a new menu item called Khanom Piak poon. Therefore, the ingredients and preparation process are similar, but without the adding of fresh coconut milk. Kanom Piak Poon from the Chom Thong community is a traditional Thai dessert that has long been popular within the community and neighboring areas. Interviews with community elders reveal that Kanom Piak Poon has been passed down for generations, commonly made at home and sold during festivals and ceremonial events. Additionally, it is often prepared for offering during Buddhist merit-making on holy days.

A unique characteristic of Kanom Piak Poon from Chom Thong is its distinct black color, which is achieved by burning fresh palm leaves to produce black charcoal. This method differs from other communities, which typically use dried coconut husks to obtain the black color.

== Ingredients ==
It is made with rice flour, palm sugar and precipitated limewater (น้ำปูนใส; RTGS: nam pun sai; Thai pronunciation: [náːm pūːn sǎj]). The word ปูน (lime) gives sweet its name. The mixture is often thickened using arrowroot or tapioca starch. As a colouring, charred coconut coir (fibre from outer husk) or crushed pandan leaves may be added. The mixture is then heated on the brass pan before allowed to set on the tray. Grated coconut may be sprinkled as desired.

Here are the detailed ingredients measurements:

Ingredients for Making Thai Coconut Pudding (Kanom Piak Poon)

- 100 g rice flour
- 50 g tapioca flour
- 100 g palm sugar or coconut sugar
- 50 g granulated sugar
- 1/2 teaspoon salt
- 250 ml coconut water
- 250 ml slaked lime water
- 400 ml pandan leaf juice
- 200 ml pasteurized coconut milk

Ingredients for Fresh Coconut Cream Topping

- 300 ml pasteurized coconut milk
- 1/2 tablespoons rice flour
- 1/2 teaspoon salt
- 100 g young coconut kernel
- Roasted sesame seeds (optional)

== Preparation ==
Authentic Khanom Piak poon begins with rice flour that's been allowed to ferment, then meticulously grounding into a fine paste using a traditional stone mill. A blend of rich palm sugar, granulated sugar, and a hint of burnt palm leaves (though this is less common compare to pandan leaf) is combined with lime water, and the mixture is cooked to perfection. The finishing touch involves pouring the cooked custard into square molds or round molds. Once set, it's cut into bite-sized pieces. Beloved by locals, this dessert is often referred to as "four-sided Khanom Piak poon". To finish, it's garnished with a sprinkle of fresh, shredded young coconut kernel tossed with a touch of salt for a delightful contrast of flavors.

== Belief ==
In common with other Thai desserts, Khanom piakpoon is part of religious ceremonies, such as almsgiving, house opening and funeral.

== In geometry ==
In Thailand, rhombus is called Si-liam (Thai: สี่เหลี่ยม, pronounced [siːlia̯m]) according to the square-like shape of this type of dessert.

== Familiar cuisine ==
- List of Thai desserts
- Bánh đúc – Vietnamese rice cake
- Khanom inthanin (ขนมอินทนิล; RTGS: Khanom inthanin; Thai pronunciation: [K̄hnm xinthnil]) - soft texture dessert serve with coconut milk
- Khanom sira on (ขนมศิลาอ่อน; RTGS: Khanom sira on; Thai pronunciation: [K̄hnm ṣ̄ilā x̀xn]) - khanom piakpoon topping with nuts
- Khanom bandook (ขนมบันดุก; RTGS: Khanom bandook; Thai pronunciation: [K̄hnm bạn duk]) - khanom piakpoon topping with nuts and syrup
- Kalamae (กาละแม; RTGS: Kalamae; Thai pronunciation: [Kālamæ]) - chewy texture thai dessert with sticky rice
- Khanom tako (ขนมตะโก้; RTGS: Khanom tako; Thai pronunciation: [K̄hnm takô]) - khanom piakpoon with coconut milk layers
- Khanom chan (ขนมชั้น; RTGS: Khanom chan; Thai pronunciation: [K̄hnm chận]) - khanom piak poon with many layers
