= Khanom babin =

Dessert in Thailand Cuisine

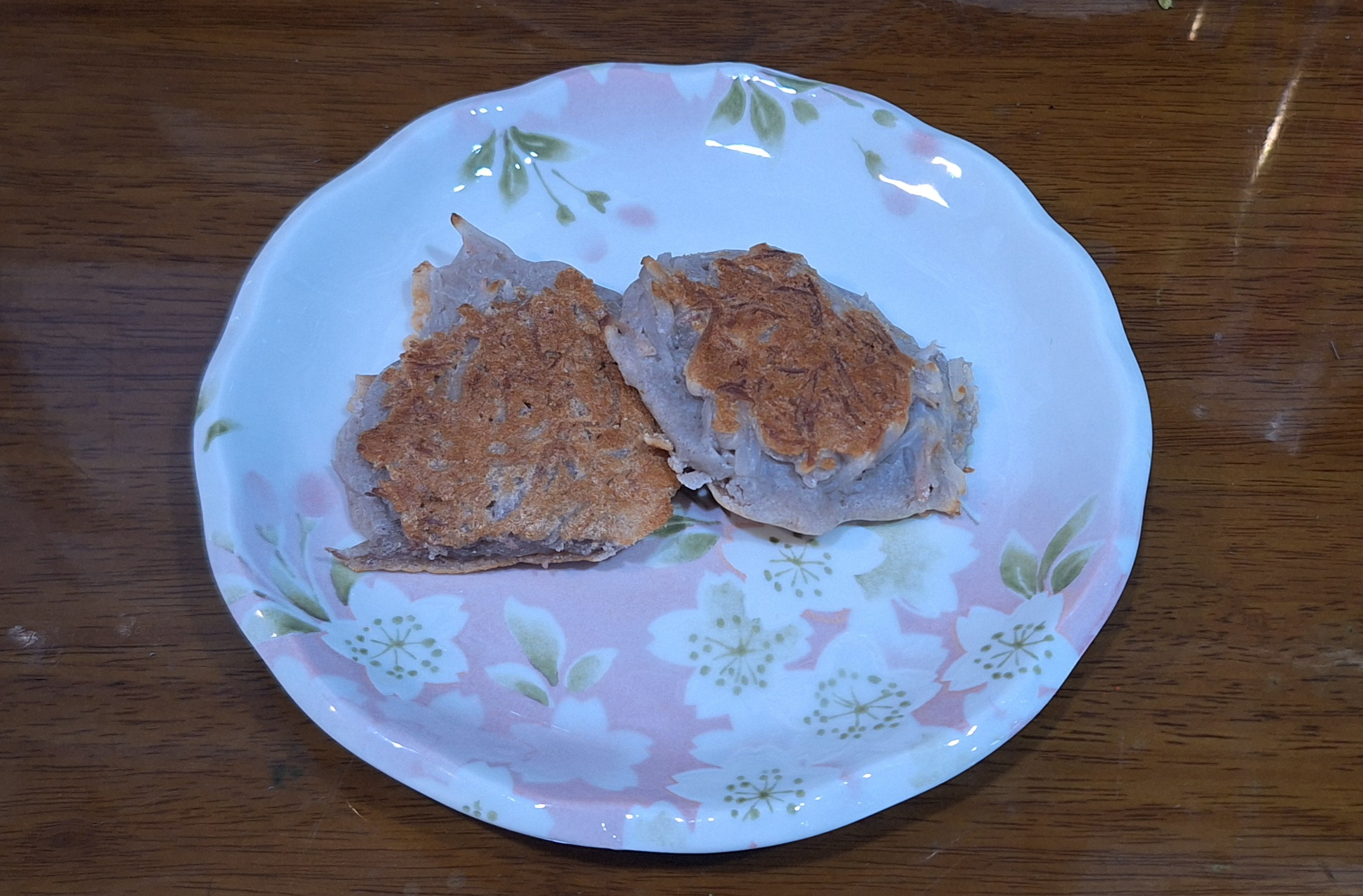
- Type: Snack
- Place of origin: Thailand
- Region or state: Southeast Asia
- Associated cuisine: Thailand
- Main ingredients: Rice flour; Coconut milk; Sugar; Coconut
- Ingredients generally used: Egg
- Food energy (per 50 g serving): 133 kcal (560 kJ)
Nutritional value
(per 50 g serving)
- Protein: 1 g
- Fat: 1 g
- Carbohydrate: 30 g

Khanom babin (Thai: ขนมบ้าบิ่น, romanized: khanombābin, pronounced [kʰā.nǒm bâː.bìn]), also spelled as kanom babin, is a popular Thai dessert that comes from Ayutthaya. It is made from young coconut, rice flour, coconut milk, sugar and egg.

== Etymology ==
The term babin in Thai, meaning of wild crazy or daredevil, is compound of two words from Proto-Tai cognitive with Northern Thai, ba (literally, "wild crazy") and Northern Thai bìn, binh (literally, "slightly cracked, splits").

== History ==
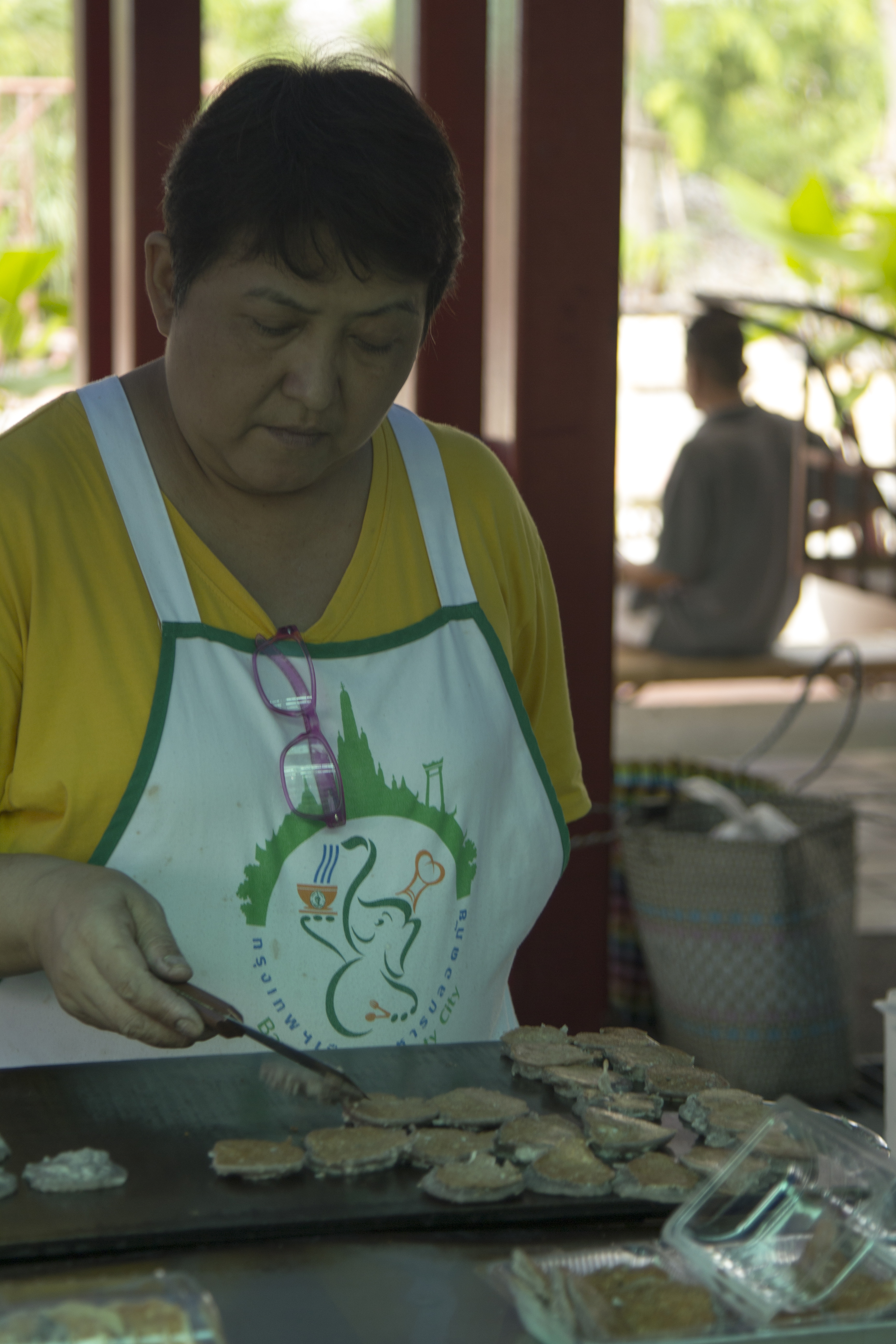
seller making Khanom babin

Khanom babin or coconut cake is one of the traditional desserts of Thailand. There are two ideas of the history of Khanom babin. The first idea is that Khanom Babin originated from the Amphoe Tha Ruea, Ayutthaya Province. During King Rama V's period, it was called Khanom Paabin and was made by aunt Bin. As time passed, it became called Khanom babin. The second idea is that Khanom babin was influenced by the queijada de Coimbra, which is a dessert from the Portuguese city of Coimbra. The origin of the name Khanom babin comes from the last word of queijada de Coimbra. This word ("Coimbra") ends in "-bra" which sounds like "ba" (Thai: บ้า). The Portuguese use cheese in the queijada de Coimbra, but Thais put in young coconut instead. The main ingredients of Khanom babin are glutinous flour, arrowroot, grated coconut, eggs, oil and sugar. It looks like a tiny pancake. The taste is not too sweet or greasy and it smells good. This dessert is commonly eaten on almost every occasion. However, Khanom babin is now hard to find because only a few vendors sell it. Khanom babin can be found in local open markets and at roadside stands.

== See also ==
- Thai cuisine
- List of Thai desserts
