= Khanom sot sai =

Thai dessert

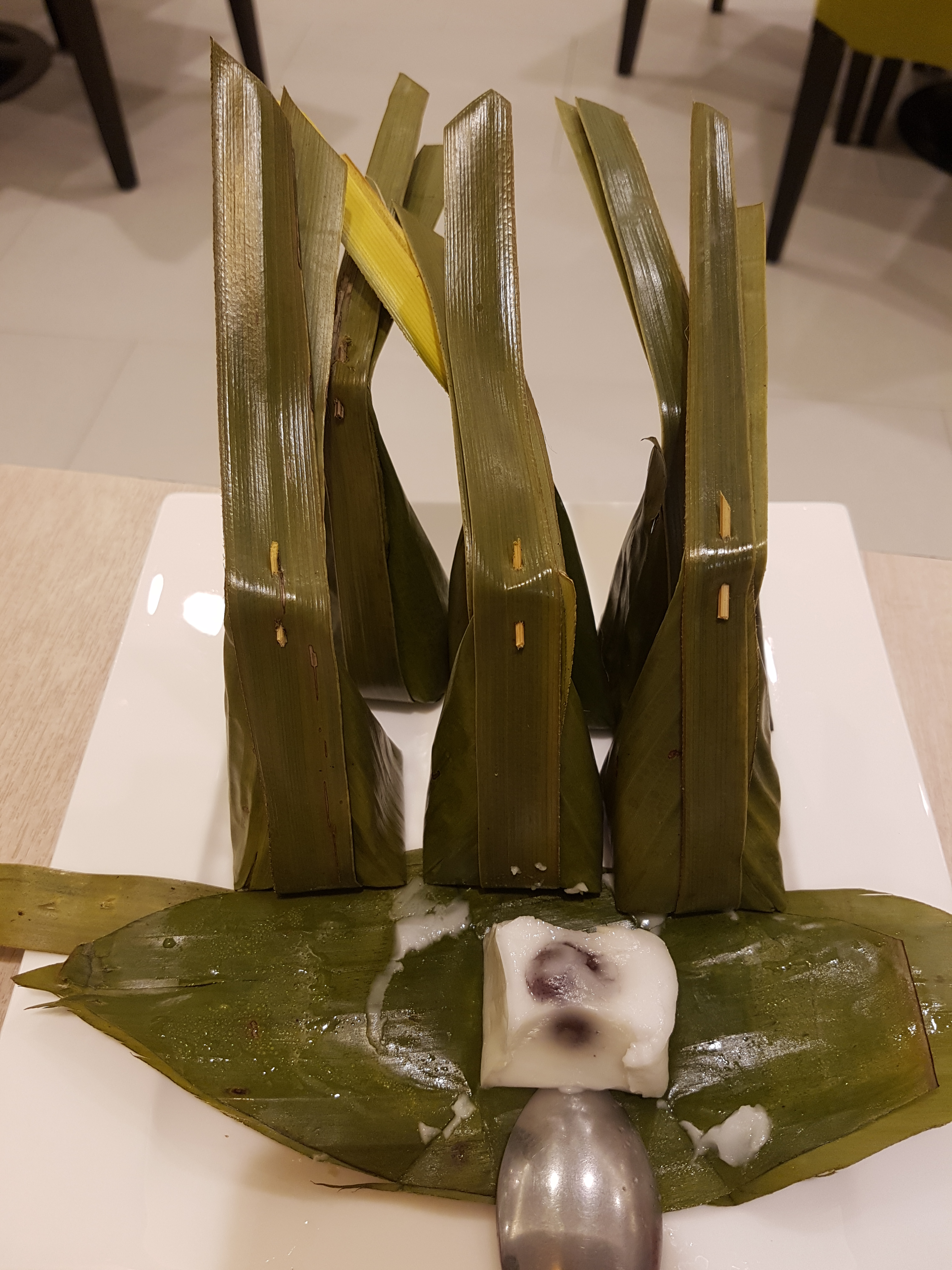
Khanom sot sai

Khanom sot sai (Thai: ขนมสอดไส้, pronounced [kʰānǒm sɔ̀ːt sâj]), also known as khanom sai sai (ขนมใส่ไส้, pronounced [kʰānǒm sàj sâj]), is a Thai dessert with a sweet filling. It is made up of coconut and palm sugar, and the filling is covered with steamed rice flour mixed with coconut cream. It was used at Thai wedding ceremonies in ancient times. It is traditionally packed by wrapping in a banana leaf.

== See also ==
- List of Thai desserts

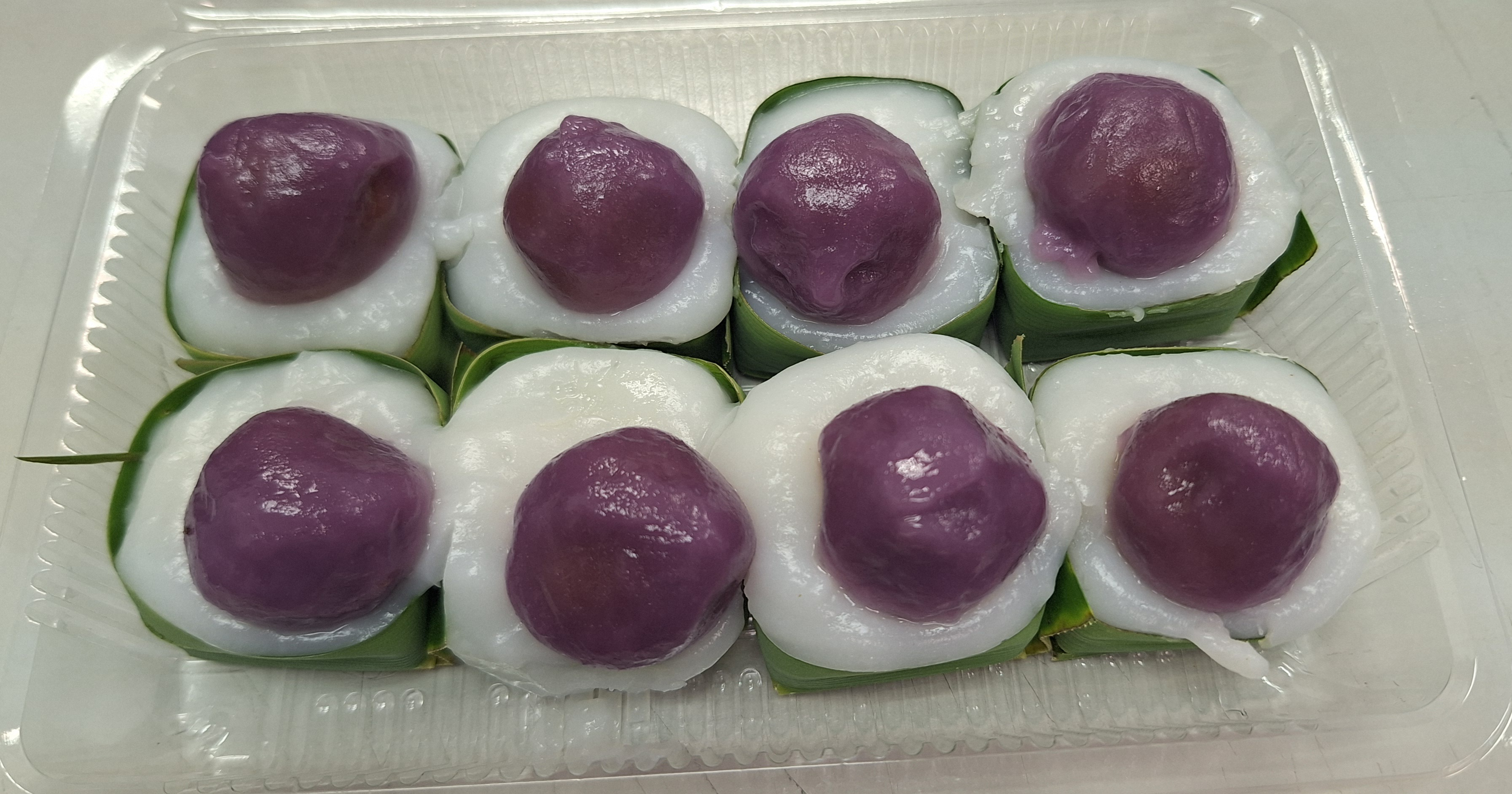
Khanom sot sai in Modern Style
