= Thapthim krop =

Thai dessert

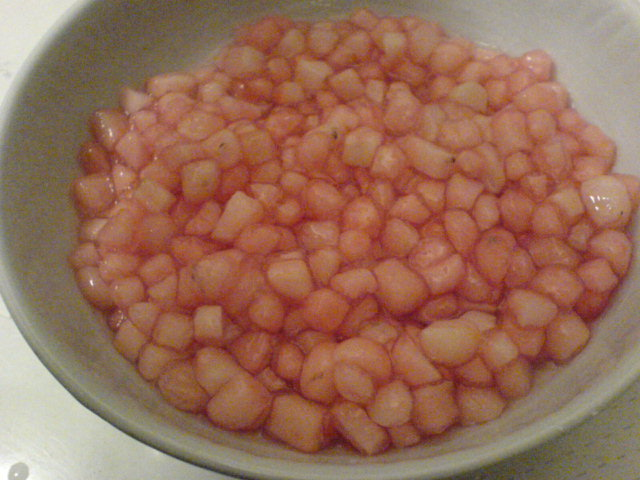
- Thapthim krop
- Type: Dessert
- Place of origin: Thailand
- Main ingredients: Water chestnut, Coconut milk

Thapthim krop (Thai: ทับทิมกรอบ, pronounced [tʰáp.tʰīm krɔ̀ːp]; literally 'crispy rubies') is one of the best known Thai desserts, having been named one of the world's best 50 desserts by CNN Travel. It is made of cubes of water chestnuts soaked in grenadine or red food dye, then boiled in tapioca flour. This dessert is known as "pomegranate seeds" or "rubies" because of its appearance. It is usually eaten with coconut milk and ice cubes.

== See also ==
- List of Thai desserts
- List of Thai dishes
- List of desserts
