= Cha mongkut =

Traditional Thai dessert

Cha mongkut (Thai: จ่ามงกุฎ, pronounced [t͡ɕàː mōŋkùt]) is a name of one of the traditional Thai desserts. It is similar to kalamae and is made of rice flour and glutinous flour mixed with green bean flour, and is stirred with coconut milk and sugar until it becomes sticky; it is typically sprinkled with chopped roasted peanuts on top or stuffed with melon seeds (The old traditional recipe uses pieces of fried flour that are as small as rice grains, which take a longer time to prepare.). Traditionally, they are cut into bite-size pieces and wrapped with banana leaf. Moreover, the aromatic scents of the dessert are given by fresh flowers such as Kesidang, Ylang-Ylang, Damask rose, and Jasmine with boiled water, which is used to squeeze coconut milk. Cha mongkut is easy to keep and does not need to be stored in a refrigerator.

== Cultural significance ==
Cha mongkut has been mentioned in The Verse of Foods and Desserts by the King Rama II of Siam, and the original recipe of cha mongkut belongs to Sri Suriyendra, the Queen Consort of the King. Cha mongkut is known to be used in the celebration of a job promotion because its auspicious meaning has the highest prestige and a great prosperity in the work. In wedding ceremonies, it represents blessings of high progress and dignity.

== History ==
The name of cha mongkut is sometimes confused with another kind of dessert called dara thong or thong ek krachang, which is a round shaped thong ek dabbed with a gold leaf on its tip and arranged on a small powder plate decorated with sweetened melon seeds.

Dara thong or thong ek krachang, which some people call cha mongkut, actually originated from its winning in the Thai Dessert competition in the new year event when Plaek Phibunsongkhram was the prime minister of Thailand. Thus, it has existed for less than a hundred years, whereas cha mongkut has maintained its presence since Rama II's reign which was over 200 years ago. It possibly existed before that, but no valid evidence has been found.
