= Khanom nuan haeo =

- Course: Dessert
- Place of origin: Thailand
- Region or state: Upper central Thailand
- Created by: Banphot Phisai folk
- Serving temperature: hot, warm, or room temperature
- Main ingredients: Chufa flour, sugar, water, coconut milk, palm sugar

Khanom nuan haeo (Thai: ขนมนวลแห้ว, pronounced [kʰà.nǒm nuːan hɛ̂ːw]) is a traditional Thai dessert originating from Banphot Phisai district in Nakhon Sawan province. It is considered a local delicacy born from the wisdom of Banphot Phisai farmers. After the harvest season, farmers would dig up chufa (Note: A type of chestnut that grows naturally in rice fields.), grind it, and sun-dry it into flour, which was then used to make this dessert.

In earlier times, the sweet was commonly sold by roaming vendors carrying baskets. Later, as farming methods shifted from buffalo plowing to mechanized tractors, the natural growth of chufa plants dwindled. The remaining supply was insufficient for large-scale production. Consequently, Khanom nuan haeo gradually faded into rarity. Because chufa flour became costly, the dessert was reserved only for special traditional occasions such as weddings and ordination ceremonies.

Today, Khanom nuan haeo has been revived and introduced to neighbouring provinces such as Kamphaeng Phet, Phichit, and Phitsanulok. In some areas of Phitsanulok, the tradition of collecting wild chufu to make this dessert still continues.

In 2025, the Ministry of Culture recognized Khanom nuan haeo as "The Lost Taste of Nakhon Sawan", under the "One Province, One Menu" initiative, which celebrates disappearing local culinary traditions.

== See also ==
- List of Thai desserts and snacks
