= Butterfly pea =

Butterfly pea is a common name for several plants and may refer to:

- Centrosema, a genus native to the Americas
- Clitoria ternatea, a species native to tropical Asia, and cultivated as an ornamental

== See also ==
- Butterfly pea flower tea – made with Clitoria ternatea
