= Khanom thang taek =

Thai street food

Khanom thang taek (Thai: ขนมถังแตก), also known as poor man's pancake, is a roadside snack in Thailand. Khamom thang taek is a pancake with a bubble vesting face load with other toppings. Khanom thang taek is a Thai signature snack at the temple fairs. Formerly, people could find it only at temple fairs. Today, this snack can be found at many local markets or on the roadside.

Literally, thang taek translates as "broken bucket" (or "broken barrel"), but it is also an idiom for bankruptcy or a person who is broke, hence the term poor man's pancake. The name might be a reference to the bursting of bubbles when it is made, though some people say that khanom thang taek is very cheap, so even a poor man can buy it.

Khanom thang taek is made from a mixture of rice flour and coconut milk (some recipes include eggs or egg whites) and is topped with shredded coconut, sugar, and sesame seeds. Sometimes there are other kinds of toppings such as sweetmeats, garlic and pepper. There are also recipes that add pandan (Bai Toey) juice to give it a green color and good smell.
