= Pumpkin-coconut custard =

Southeast Asian dessert

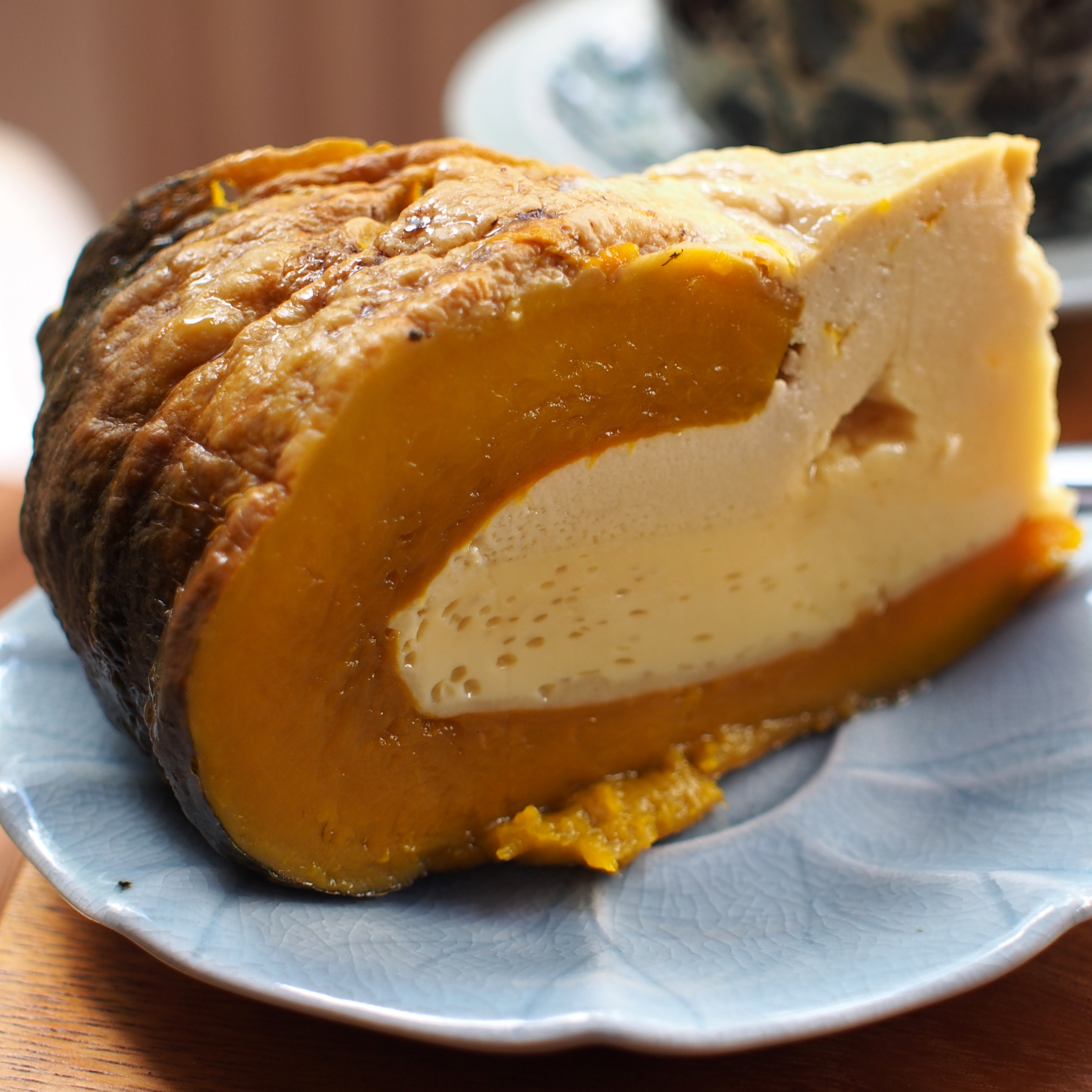
- A slice of pumpkin-coconut custard
- Type: Custard
- Course: Dessert
- Place of origin: Ayutthaya Kingdom
- Region or state: Southeast Asia
- Associated cuisine: Thai, Cambodian and Laotian cuisine
- Created by: Maria Guyomar de Pinha
- Invented: 17th century
- Main ingredients: Coconut custard, pumpkin or kabocha
- Food energy (per serving): 1,895 kcal (7,930 kJ)
Nutritional value
(per serving)
- Protein: 46 g
- Fat: 112 g
- Carbohydrate: 208 g

Pumpkin-coconut custard (Thai: สังขยาฟักทอง, sangkhaya fak thong, [sǎŋ.kʰā.jǎː fák tʰɔ̄ːŋ]; Khmer: សង់ខ្យាល្ពៅ, sangkhya lapoeu; Lao: ສັງຂະຫຍາໝາກອຶ, sangkhanya mak eu, [sǎŋ.kʰā.ɲǎ mȁːk ʔɯ́ʔ]; Northeastern Thai: สังขยาบักอึ, [sǎŋ.kʰā.ɲǎː bǎk ʔɯ̌ʔ], sangkhaya bak ue) is a Southeast Asian dessert, consisting of a coconut custard steam-baked in a whole pumpkin or kabocha. It was created by Maria Guyomar de Pinha in Ayutthaya Kingdom in 17th century as an adaptation of a Portuguese egg-based dessert.

In Thailand, it is a popular dessert that is often sold in fresh food markets and as street food. In Cambodia, the pumpkin-coconut custard is also sold in markets and confectionery stores often by the slice. It is the centerpiece of Cambodian New Year tables. In Laos, the dessert is a very common market food as well.

== See also ==
- Coconut jam
- List of custard desserts
- List of squash and pumpkin dishes
