= Maria Guyomar de Pinha =

Siamese palace cook, wife of Constantine Phaulkon

Thao Thong Kip Ma Maria Guyomar de Pina
- มารีอา กียูมาร์ ดึ ปีญา
- Born: 1664; Ayutthaya Kingdom
- Died: 1728 (aged 63–64); Ayutthaya Kingdom
- Occupation: cook
- Spouse: Constantine Phaulkon (m. 1682; died 1688)
- Children: Jorge Phaulkon (son); João Phaulkon (son)
- Parents: Fanik Guyomar (father); Ursula Yamada (mother)
- Culinary career
- Cooking style: Portuguese-Siamese cuisine

Maria Guyomar de Pina (Thai: มารีอา กียูมาร์ ดึ ปีญา; 1664 – 1728) (also known as Maria Guiomar de Pina, Dona Maria del Pifia or as Marie Guimar and Madame Constance in French), Thao Thong Kip Ma (Thai: ท้าวทองกีบม้า), was a Siamese woman from Ayutthaya. She was of mixed Japanese, Portuguese and Bengali descent. She became the wife of Greek adventurer Constantine Phaulkon.

Maria Guyomar is known in Thailand for having introduced new dessert recipes in Siamese cuisine at the Ayutthaya court. Some of her dishes were influenced by Portuguese cuisine, especially egg yolk-based sweets such as foi thong, sangkhaya fakthong and sangkhaya.

== Biography ==
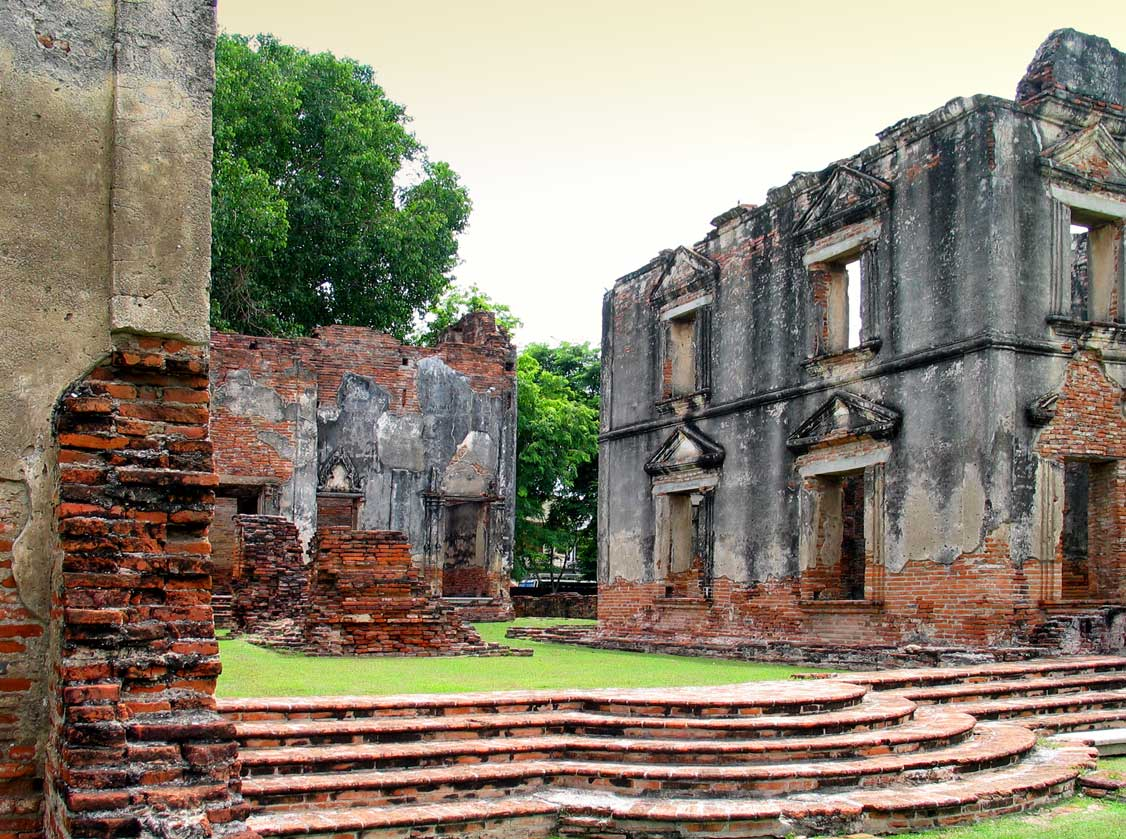
The residence of Constantine Phaulkon and Maria Guyomar de Pinha (Baan Vichayen), in Lopburi, Thailand.

Maria was born in Ayutthaya during the reign of King Narai. Her father was known as Fanique or Phanick, a Mestiço from Goa of mixed Portuguese, Bengali and Japanese ancestry, who was described as "half-black, half-Bengali, half-Japanese," a devout Catholic of little means. Her mother was a Japanese Christian, named Ursula Yamada, who was claimed to be descended from the first Japanese Christian baptized by Francis Xavier in 1549. A contemporary account noted that Ursula was not a very faithful wife and bore children of varying complexions, including one (Maria) of light complexion who was fathered by a Jesuit priest.

Maria Guyomar was brought up as a Catholic. In 1682, Maria married Constantine Phaulkon after he abandoned Anglicanism for Catholicism. They had two sons, George "Jorge" Phaulkon and Constantin "João" Phaulkon, and lived a life of affluence as Phaulkon rose to become highly influential at the royal court of king Narai.

During the period of rapprochement between France and the Siamese court Maria Guyomar de Pinha, together with her husband Phaulkon, was promised French protection by being ennobled a countess of France. During the 1688 Siamese revolution, after the execution of her husband on 5 June, she managed to flee Ayutthaya with the help of a French officer named Sieur de Sainte-Marie and took refuge with the French troops in Bangkok on 4 October, but the Commander of the French fort General Desfarges returned her to the Siamese under pressure from the new ruler, usurper Phetracha, for the exchange of hostages on 18 October.

Despite the promises that had been made regarding her safety, she was condemned to perpetual slavery in the kitchens of Phetracha until his death in 1703, but remained and became the head of the royal kitchen staff.

One of her sons, Jorge, became a minor official at the Siamese court. Her second son, João, was known to have been put in charge by Prince Phon of building a German organ for the royal palace. According to French missionary sources he was called Racha Mantri and was at the same time a supervisor of the Christians in Ayutthaya and the official in charge of the royal storehouses.

In her later life, Maria, together with her daughter-in-law Louisa Passagna (widow of João), continued to sue the French East India Company to recoup money which her husband Phaulkon had lent to the company. She was vindicated in 1717 through a decree from the Council of State in France, which provided her with a maintenance allowance. Maria died in 1728.

== Thai desserts ==
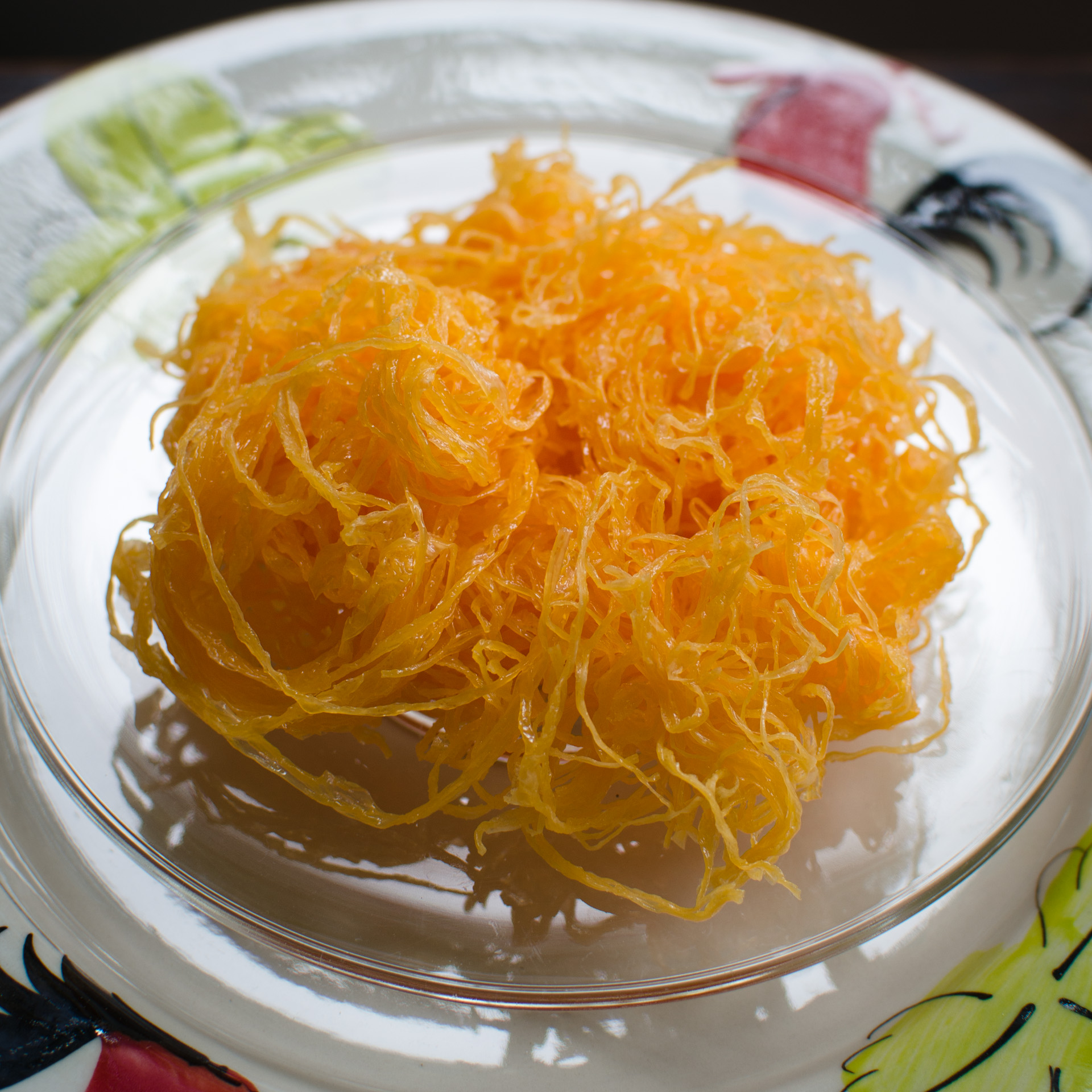
Foi thong (similar to Portuguese fios de ovos), one of several desserts introduced to Thai cuisine by Maria Guyomar

Maria Guyomar took the position of cook in the palace in the period of King Narai and introduced many new desserts into the Siamese cuisine such as curry puff, Khanom mo kaeng, Thong muan, Thong yot, Thong yip, Foi thong, Sangkaya and Khanom phing. Such desserts were presented and served to King Narai and his daughter Princess Sudawadi who appreciated them and promoted them. Khun Luang Ha Wat or King Uthumphon said that the desserts were distributed and sold in the market in area of Pa-Khanom. Following the success of the new desserts in the palace, some nobles requested to be taught the recipes. Many of her desserts were yellow like gold, a colour that was considered auspicious and pleasant in Siamese tradition. Thus, the desserts that Maria had introduced were widely popularized.

The Historical Archives of the Archdiocese of Bangkok mention that, although she introduced some local Siamese ingredients in them, Maria's sweets were largely based on traditional Portuguese desserts. The original Thai desserts had had flour, sugar or palm sugar and coconut as the main ingredients and Maria is credited with having introduced egg or yolk, refined sugar, soybean starch or cassava starch, as well as nuts, in her desserts. Angel hair or Fios de ovos, also known in Thai as Foi Thong, are egg threads where yolks were drawn into thin strands and boiled in sugar syrup. Next, Thong Yip, which is a sweet made from egg, was developed from Trouxa de ovos. They have a different external look, Thong Yip is pleated but Trouxa de ovos are rolled. Also, Khanom mo kaeng is a sweet made from flour egg and coconut milk, is similar to Tigelada, a Portuguese traditional sweet that has rolled almond as main ingredient. During King Narai’s period, a version known as Khanom kumphamat (Thai: ขนมกุมภมาศ) was served to the king in a pot which was made from precious metal.

There is, however, some disagreement over Maria’s role in popularizing the desserts, Pridi Phitphumwithi claimed that some of the kinds of dessert attributed to Maria had been previously known by Siamese people. They had been named “Convent sweet” because they were cooked by the nuns in Portuguese convents. Other critics claim that even though a large array of Siamese desserts are claimed to have been invented by Maria, only two kinds of dessert —Foi thong and Thong yip— can be fully said to be the fruit of her own skill.

== Popular culture ==
The role of Maria Guyomar is featured in the 2018 historical drama TV series Love Destiny (original title Bupphesanniwat) and the 2023 historical drama TV series Love Destiny 2. She is portrayed by the Anglo-Thai actress Susira Naenna.

The role is also featured in the 2026 historical drama TV series Love Destiny, a boy's love reimagining of the original series where she is portrayed by the Thai-German actress Anna Sueangam-iam.

== See also ==
- Luso-Asians
- Thai food
- Nine auspicious Thai desserts

== Bibliography ==
- Reid, Anthony (Editor), Southeast Asia in the Early Modern Era, Cornell University Press, 1993, ISBN 0-8014-8093-0
- Smithies, Michael (2002), Three military accounts of the 1688 "Revolution" in Siam, Itineria Asiatica, Orchid Press, Bangkok, ISBN 974-524-005-2 คึกเดช, ก. (2002).ท้าวทองกีบม้า. Bangkok Thailand: สำนักพิมพ์แห่งจุฬาลงกรณ์มหาวิทยาลัย
- Thao Thong Kip Ma - Her life in comic (in Thai)
