= Khanom sane chan =

Thai dessert

Khanom sane chan (Thai: ขนมเสน่ห์จันทน์, pronounced [kʰā.nǒm sā.nèː t͡ɕān]) is a traditional sweet dessert originating in Thailand. It is typically round and bright yellow in appearance. The dish is often served in wedding ceremonies in Thailand.

== Etymology ==
The word chan came from the name of the Chan tree, which has a fruit similar in shape and color to the dish. Sa-ne means charm in Thai.

== History ==
One story of its origin is:

"A young man harvested bright yellow fruit from a tree for his mother. When he brought that fruit to eat for dinner, it was missing, but despite this the house still smelled of the fruit. He wanted his mother to taste this fruit so he goes back to the tree while a full moon was out. When he got to the tree, a woman was there who wanted the fruit as well. She said that her father would be grateful if she gave him some of the fruit, so they both took some home. After that day, in every full moon, the young man went to the tree and met the woman while they both harvest fruit. They fell in love and married."

According to legend this fruit brings happiness and gratitude.

== See also ==
- List of Thai desserts

== Sources ==
- "Menu". oknation.net. Freya. (2013, December 10)
- c. "ความหมายของขนมหวานไทย..." GotoKnow. C. (2009, March 15).
- ศิรสุภรณ์ ไสยวงศ์. "ขนมเสน่ห์จันทน์". sirasuporn.blogspot.com. ศิรสุภรณ์ ไสยวงศ์. (2012, August 14).
