= Thong muan =

Thai snack

- Alternative names: Thai roll wafer
- Type: Rolled sweet wafer biscuit
- Course: dessert
- Place of origin: Thailand
- Main ingredients: rice flour, sugar, eggs, shredded coconut, black sesame

Thong muan (Thai: ทองม้วน, pronounced [tʰɔ̄ːŋ múa̯n]; lit. 'rolled gold') is a Thai snack, similar to the American pirouline. It is a crispy wafer that comes in a cigar-shaped form. Its origins was influenced by the Portuguese. Due to its name, Thai people present thong muan as a gift, symbolizing wishes for wealth.

== History ==
Thong muan is mentioned in the Kap He Chom Khrueang Khao Wan poem from the King Rama II era (1767 – 1824). In the King Rama 2 Era, Thailand interacted with Eastern and Western countries, receiving their dessert recipes. Thong Muan were introduced into Thailand by Portuguese nuns.

== Ingredients ==
Thong Muan's ingredients can be modified in individual recipes, but the traditional ingredients are rice flour, coconut milk, eggs, and black sesame seeds.

== Production ==
The ingredients are mixed together and placed on a Thong Muan mold pan. The cookies are then baked, and turned once during cooking. The cookies are then rolled before being removed from the pan.

== Selling ==
Thong Muan is often sold at OTOP (One Tambon One Product) shops, along roadsides and at some Thai style coffee shops. It is a popular export to Hong Kong, Japan, American, Canada, Austria, Germany, and Taiwan. Thong Muan is found at gift shops at the airport. In 2015, the export income of Thong Muan reached approximately 100 million Baht.

== See also ==
- List of Thai desserts
