= Thong yot =

Thai dessert

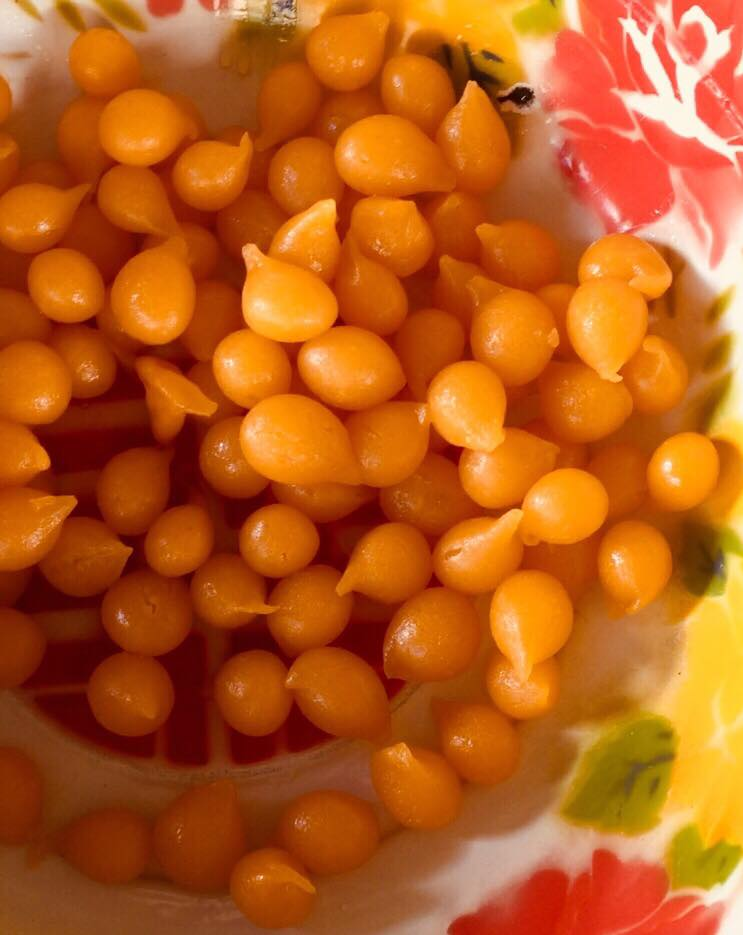
- Type: Snack
- Course: Dessert
- Place of origin: Ayutthaya Kingdom
- Region or state: Southeast Asia
- Created by: Maria Guyomar de Pinha
- Main ingredients: eggs

Thong yot (Thai: ทองหยอด, pronounced [tʰɔ̄ːŋ jɔ̀ːt]), also known as "gold egg-yolks drops", is a Thai dessert and one of the nine auspicious traditional Thai desserts. Thong yot originated in Aveiro District, Portugal. Thong yot was adapted from ovos moles de aveiro, a Portuguese dessert, by Maria Guyomar de Pinha, who was appointed as a cook in the palace in the period of King Narai of Ayutthaya. Thong yot is made from egg yolks, flour and sugar.

== Uses ==
Thong yot is one of the nine auspicious traditional Thai desserts which are used on special occasions such as wedding ceremonies. These nine auspicious traditional Thai desserts are one of Thailand's culinary treasures. Thong yot is the same type of dessert as thong yip, thong ek and foi thong. Thong yot represents blessing for wealth from one person to another person. Thong yot itself represents gold that is given to another.

== See also ==
- List of Thai desserts
