= Kap He Chom Khrueang Khao Wan =

Massaman, a curry made by my beloved,
is fragrant of cumin and strong spices.
Any man who has swallowed—
the curry is bound to long for her.

— Translation of the opening kap stanza, from Heather Arndt Anderson

The Kap He Chom Khrueang Khao Wan (Thai: กาพย์เห่ชมเครื่องคาวหวาน, pronounced [kàːp hèː t͡ɕʰōm kʰrɯ̂aŋ kʰāːw wǎːn]; lit. 'procession poem admiring savoury and sweet dishes') is a Thai poem in the form of kap he ruea (royal barge procession song), written by King Rama II in 1800, when he was Prince Itsarasunthon. It consists of four segments, the first three of which contain praises of several savoury dishes, fruits, and desserts, while the fourth mentions annual festivities. The style of the first three sections is that of the nirat, a travel lament in which the poet makes allusions to his love and pain of parting. The poem is probably Rama II's expression of love for Princess Bunrot, his lover at the time, alluded to through the food items. It is also valuable as a contemporary source on historical Thai cuisine.
