= Khanom phing =

Thai dessert

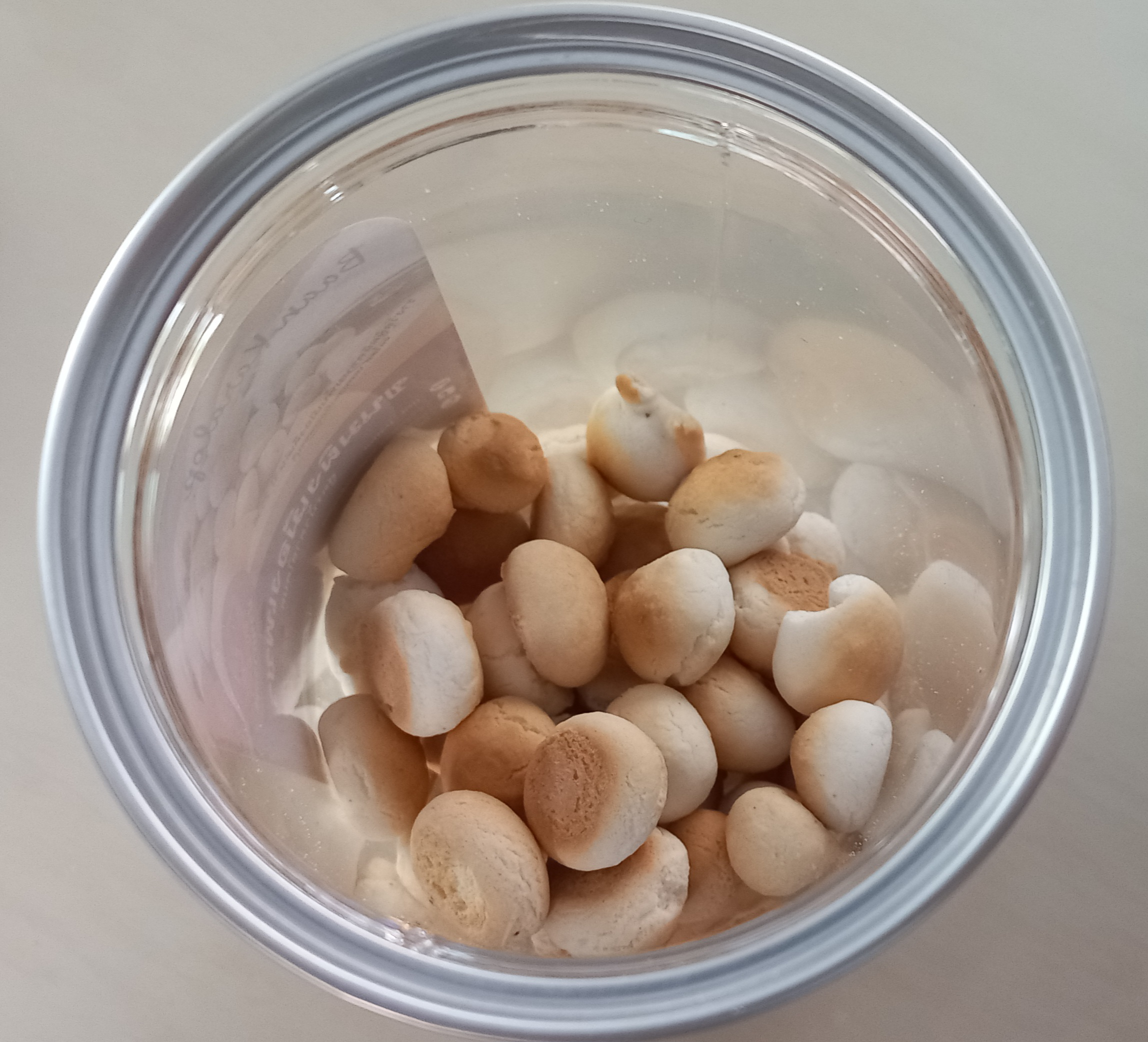
- Alternative names: ขนมผิง
- Course: Dessert
- Place of origin: Thailand
- Created by: Maria Guyomar de Pinha
- Invented: 17th century
- Main ingredients: Tapioca flour, coconut milk, and egg yolk
- Similar dishes: Cookie

Khanom phing (Thai: ขนมผิง, pronounced [kʰā.nǒm pʰǐŋ]) is a round Thai cookie consisting of tapioca flour, coconut milk, and egg yolk.

== History ==
Khanom phing is believed to have been introduced to Thailand by the Portuguese in the 17th century.

== See also ==
- List of Thai desserts
- Macaroon
