= Thong yip =

Thai dessert

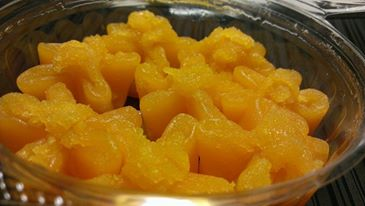
- A bowl of thong yip
- Type: Snack
- Course: Dessert
- Place of origin: Ayutthaya Kingdom
- Region or state: Southeast Asia
- Created by: Maria Guyomar de Pinha
- Main ingredients: Eggs

Thong yip (Thai: ทองหยิบ, pronounced [tʰɔ̄ːŋ jìp]) or pinched gold egg yolks is one of the nine auspicious traditional Thai desserts. It is usually made for important occasions and ceremonies such as weddings, ordinations, and housewarmings.

Thong yip was brought to Ayutthaya Kingdom by Maria Guyomar de Pinha who was eventually enslaved in the royal kitchens after Phetracha gained power in the Siamese revolution of 1688. Thong yip originates from the Portuguese sweet trouxas das caldas.

== Etymology ==
In Thai, the word thong means "gold" and yip means "to pick". It is believed that when thong yip is used in blessing ceremonies or as a gift to anyone, it will bring wealth and success in work; a person can turn something ordinary into gold once picked up. Thong yip’s shape resembles that of a flower. The number of folds used for thong yip can be 3, 5, or 8, depending on one's preference.

== See also ==
- List of Thai desserts
