= Fios de ovos =

Portuguese egg confection used in preparing desserts

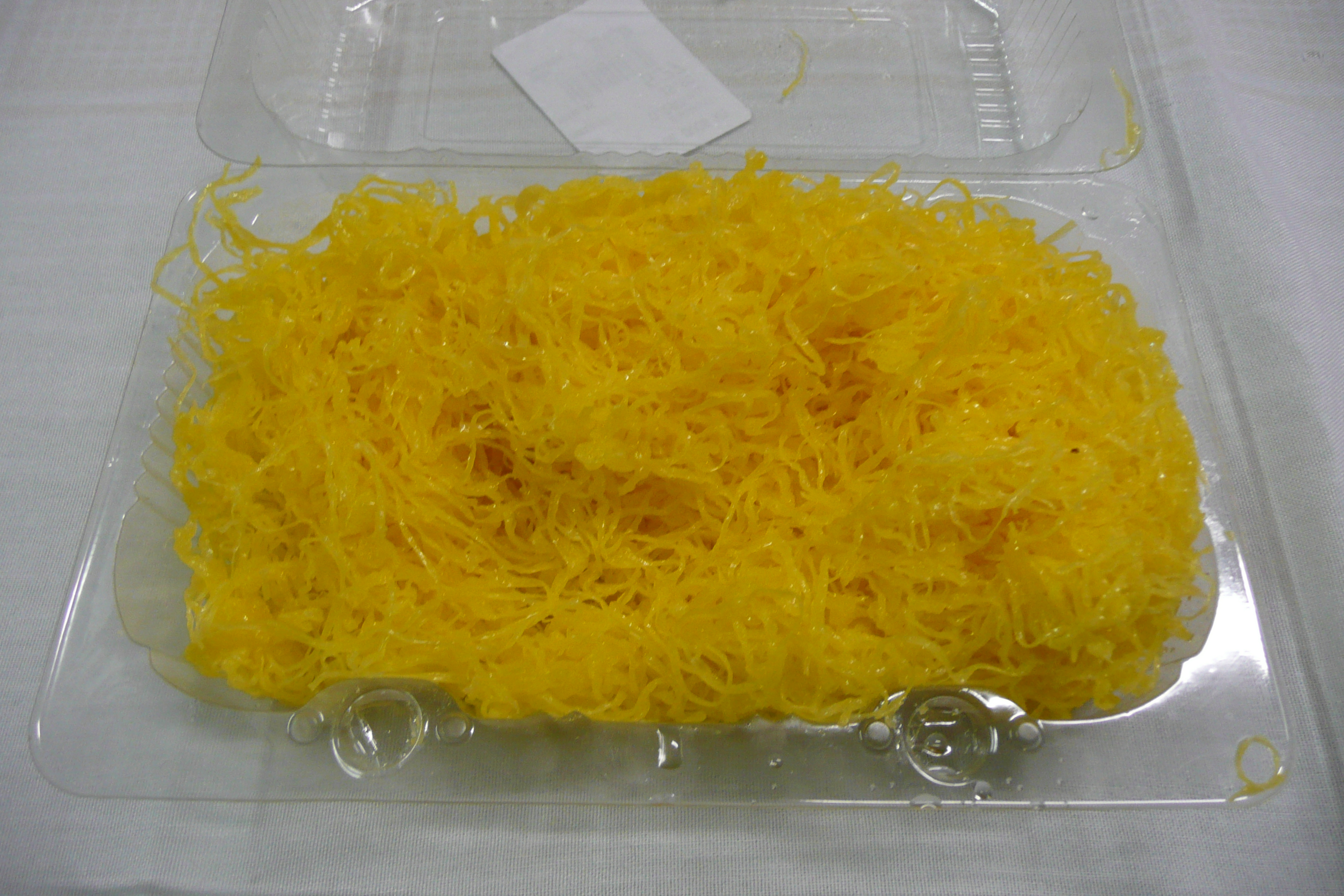
- Fios de ovos in Brazil
- Type: Dessert
- Place of origin: Portugal
- Associated cuisine: Portuguese, Spanish, Brazilian, Japanese, Cambodian, Lao, Malaysian, and Thai
- Main ingredients: Egg yolks, sugar syrup
- Variations: Encharcada, doces de ovos

Fios de ovos (lit. 'egg threads') is a traditional Portuguese sweet food made out of egg yolks, drawn into thin strands and boiled in sugar syrup. It is used as a garnish on cakes and puddings, as a filling for cakes, or eaten on its own.

Through Portuguese trade and colonization, the dish has spread to many countries in Asia. In Japan, it is known as keiran sōmen (鶏卵素麺, lit. 'hen egg noodles'), in Cambodia as vawee (Khmer: វ៉ោយ), in Malaysia as jala mas (lit. 'golden net'), in Thailand as foi thong (Thai: ฝอยทอง; lit. 'golden strand'), and in the Malabar region of Kerala, India as muttamala (മുട്ടമാല; lit. 'egg chain' or 'egg necklace'). This dish is called letria in Goa. Fios de ovos is also popular in Brazil, as well as Spain, where it is known as huevo hilado. In Seville, it is shaped into peaked cones called yemas de San Leandro.

== History ==
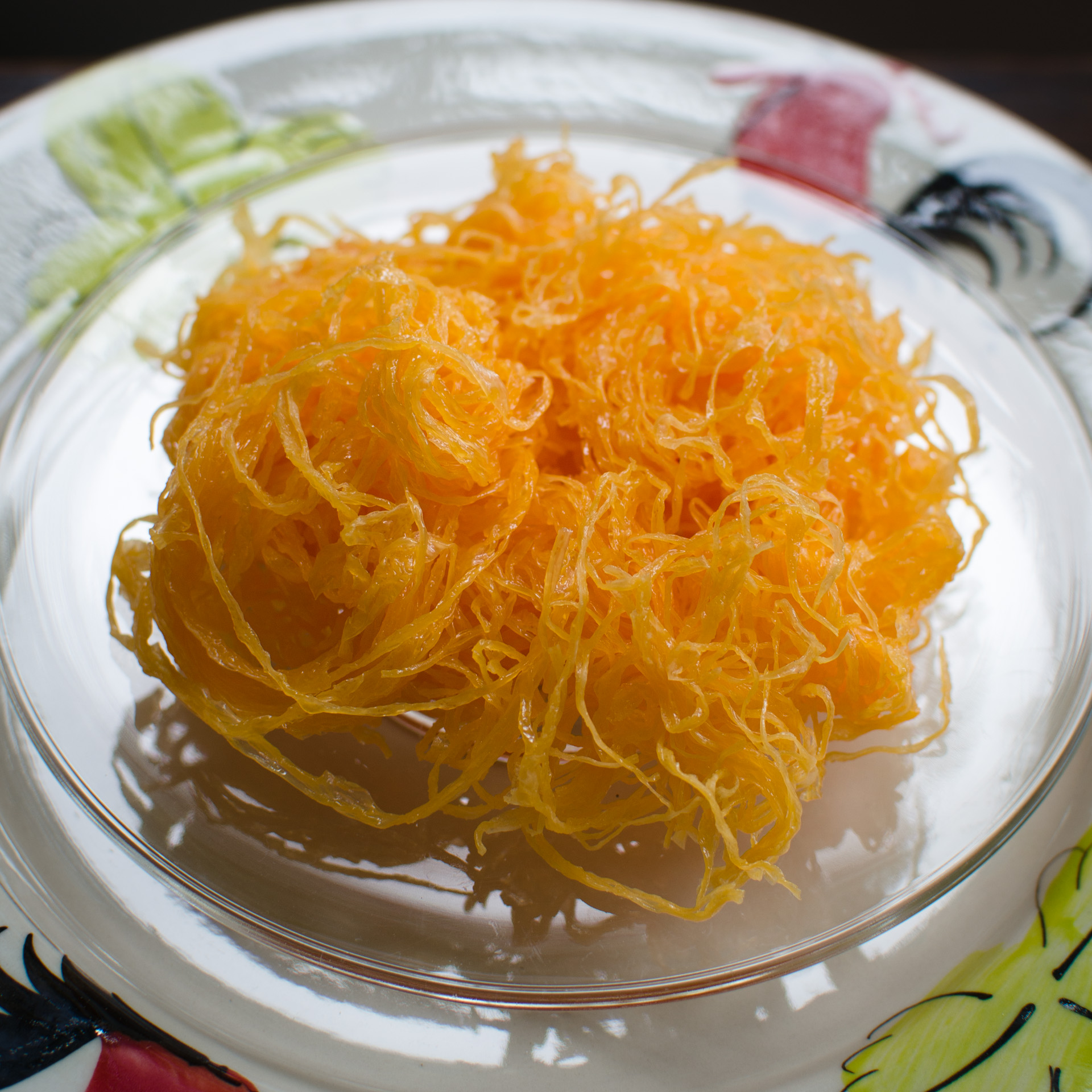
Foi thong in Thailand

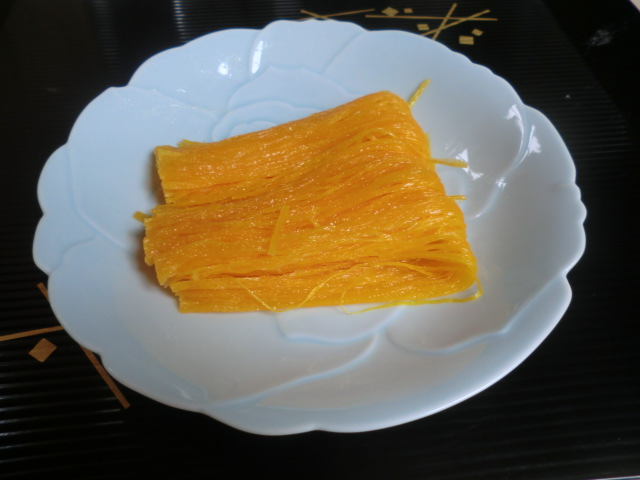
Keiran sōmen in Fukuoka, Japan

Like other egg-based Portuguese sweets, fios de ovos is believed to have been created by Portuguese nuns around the 14th or 15th century. Laundry was a common service performed by convents and monasteries, and their use of egg whites for "starching" clothes created a large surplus of yolks. Between the 16th and 18th centuries Portuguese explorers took the recipe to Japan, Thailand and parts of India.

=== Brazil ===
In Brazilian cuisine, fios de ovos is used as a topping for Marta Rocha Torte, a cake named after Miss Brazil 1954 Martha Rocha.

=== India ===
In North Malabar region of Kerala, the Portuguese-introduced fios de ovos was adapted into a local variation known as Muttamala, a sweet made of egg yolk threads cooked in sugar syrup. It represents one of the enduring culinary influences of the Portuguese presence in Kerala during the 16th century. In Goa, this dish is known as letria.

=== Cambodia ===
Fios de ovos is called voy or vawee in Khmer. It is garnished with bright candied fruit, such as cherries, and reserved only for special occasions. According to Cambodian chef Longteine De Monteiro, Vawee's origin is Thai and before that, royal Khmer. It can be bought only in a few select shops in Phnom Penh, where it is made by women who used to live in the Royal Palace.

=== Laos ===
It is one of the most difficult desserts to make in Lao cuisine. Foi thong is boiled in pandanus leaf-flavoured sugar syrup. In Laos, it is traditionally served at weddings and other ceremonial occasions, where the length of the egg threads symbolises long life.

=== Thailand ===
Fios de ovos is called foi thong (Thai: ฝอยทอง; lit. 'golden strand') in Thai. The name of the dessert comes from the observation that it has fine, long stripes and is shiny like silk. Fios de ovos was introduced from Portugal to Thailand by Maria Guyomar de Pinha, half Portuguese and Japanese who was born and raised in Thailand. It is considered a fine dessert. The word thong ('gold') has an auspicious connotation to Thai people. The long strands are also seen as symbolizing a long life and undying love.

=== Japan ===
Keiran sōmen is the name of fios de ovos in Japan. The dessert is one of the nanbangashi, which are desserts introduced from Portugal during the Nanban trade.

== Uses ==
In Portugal and Brazil, fios de ovos are often used in fillings such as pão de rala, cake decorations and other desserts and accompaniments for sweet dishes. In Brazil, they are also used as accompaniments in savory dishes, often served with canned fruits alongside Christmas turkey. In Japan, they are served in the form of dessert rolls (wagashi), and known as keiran sōmen (鶏卵素麺; egg yolk thin noodles). In North Malabar, India, they are typically prepared for weddings and festive occasions, usually served with pinjanathappam, a steamed pudding made from egg whites.

== See also ==
- Egg garnish
- Papo-de-anjo
- Quindim
- List of Brazilian sweets and desserts
