= Chili sauce and paste =

Condiment prepared with chili peppers

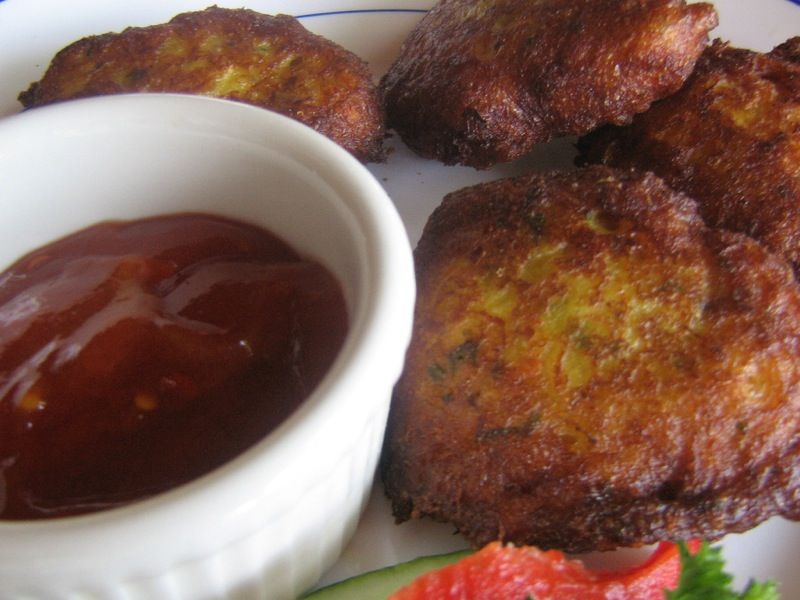
- Fritters served with chili sauce in a ramekin
- Type: Sauce
- Course: Accompaniment
- Main ingredients: Chili peppers, water
- Variations: Hot or sweet

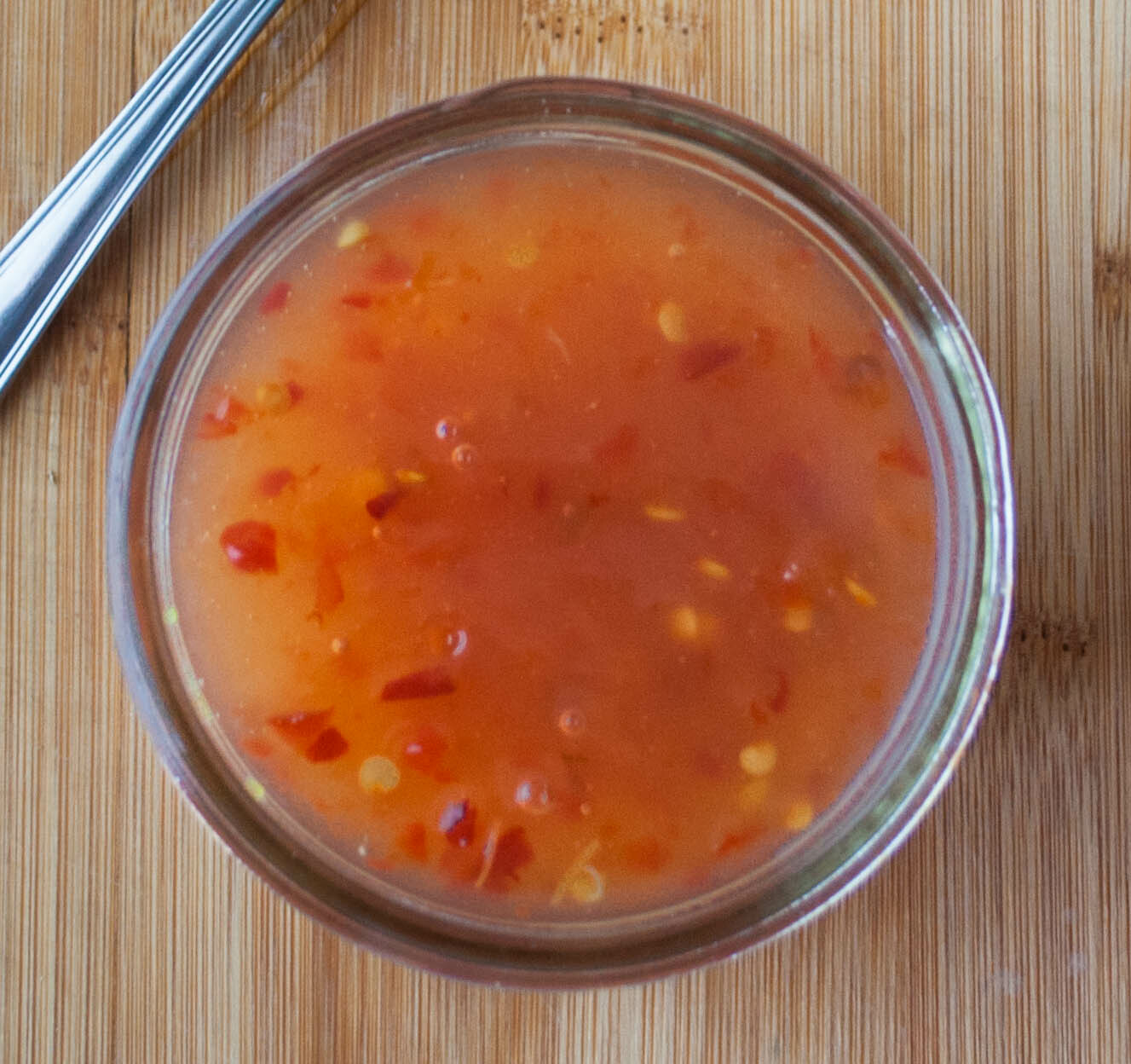
Sweet chili sauce

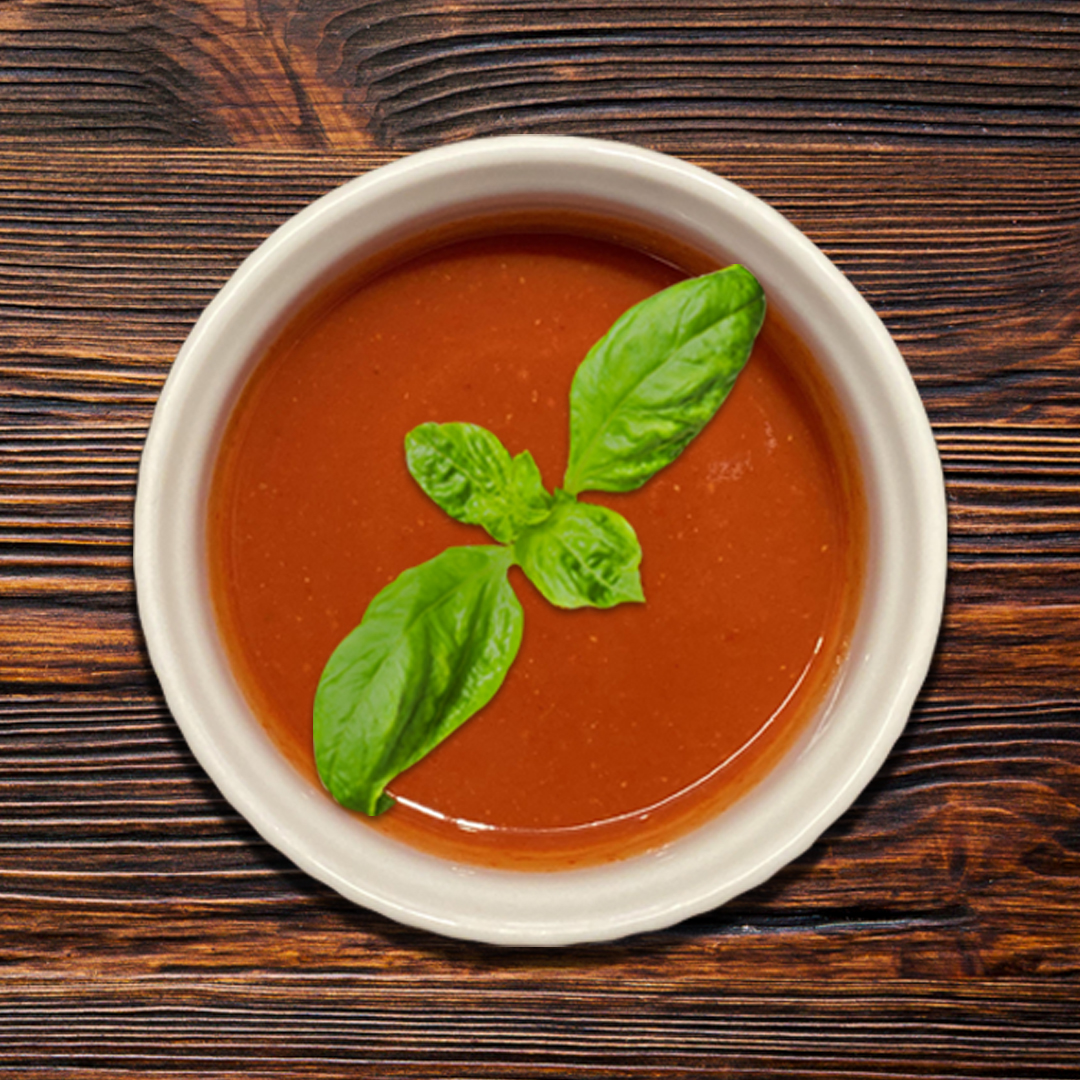
Hot sauce with basil leaves

Chili sauce and chili paste are condiments prepared with chili peppers.

Chili sauce may be hot, sweet or a combination thereof, and may differ from hot sauce in that many sweet or mild varieties exist, which is typically lacking in hot sauces. Several varieties of chili sauce include sugar in their preparation, such as the Thai sweet chili sauce and Filipino agre dulce, which adds sweetness to their flavor profile. Sometimes, chili sauces are prepared with red tomato as a primary ingredient. Many chili sauces may have a thicker texture and viscosity than hot sauces.

Chili paste usually refers to a product whose main ingredient is chili pepper. Some are used as a cooking ingredient, while others are used to season a dish after preparation. Some are fermented with beans, as in Chinese doubanjiang, and some are prepared with powdered fermented beans, as in Korean gochujang. There are regional varieties of chili paste and also within the same cuisine.

Chili sauces and pastes can be used as dipping sauces, cooking glazes and marinades. There are many commercial varieties of mass-produced chili sauce and paste.

== Ingredients ==
Ingredients typically include puréed or chopped chili peppers, vinegar, sugar and salt, that are cooked, which thickens the mixture. Additional ingredients may include, water, garlic, other foodstuffs, corn syrup, spices and seasonings. Some varieties use ripe red puréed tomato as the primary ingredient.

== Varieties ==
=== East Asia ===
==== China ====
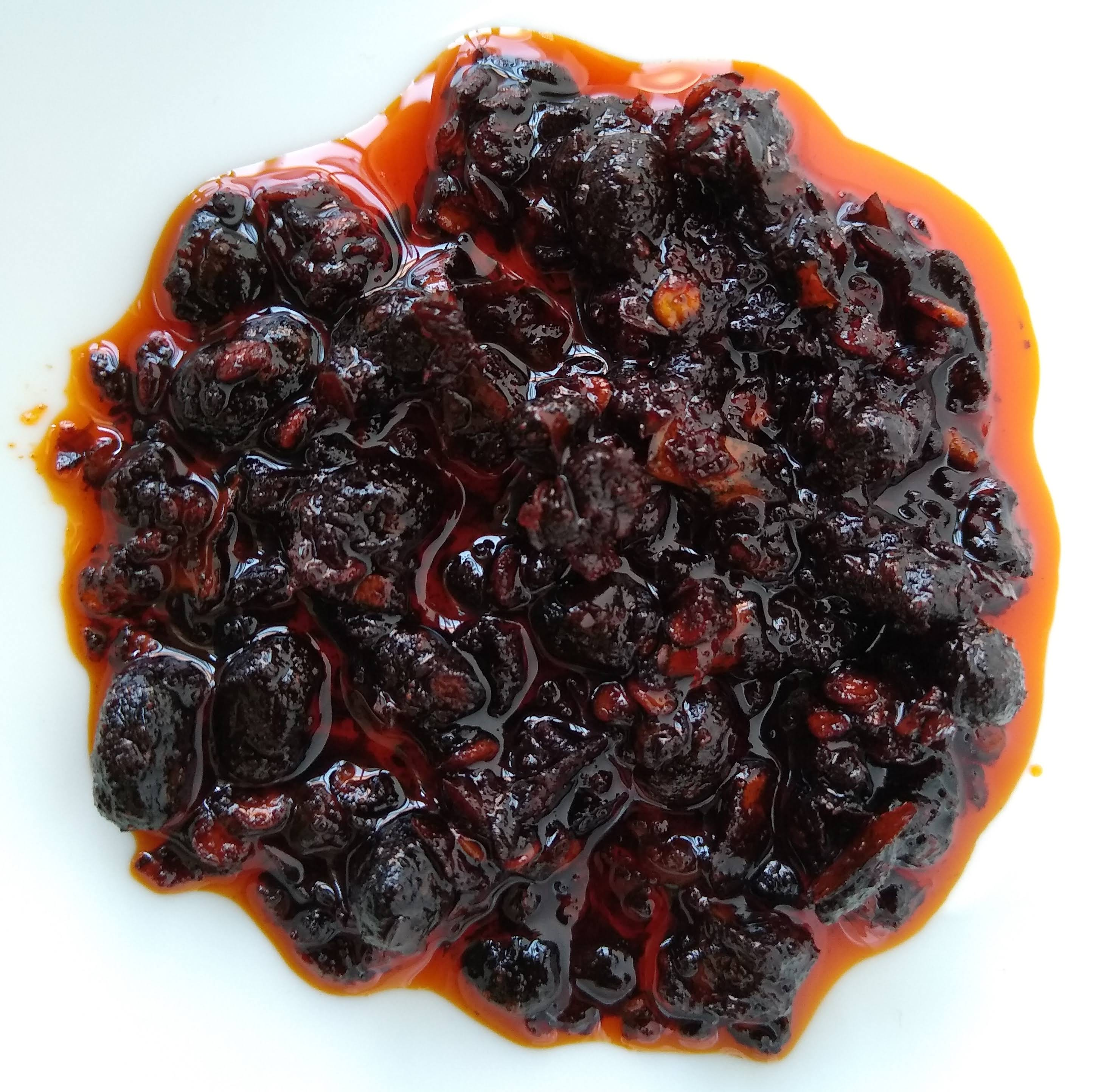
Lao Gan Ma brand you la jiao (fried chili in oil) with black beans

Chili oil is a distinctive Sichuan flavoring found mainly in cold dishes, as well as a few hot dishes. Chili oil is made by pouring hot oil onto a bowl of dried chilies, to which some Sichuan pepper is usually added. After steeping in hot oil for at least a few hours, the oil takes on the taste and fragrance of chili. The finer the chili is ground, the stronger the flavor (regional preferences vary; ground chili is usually used in western China, while whole dried chili is more common in northern China.)

Chinese chili sauces usually come as a thick paste, and are used either as a dipping sauce or in stir frying.

Doubanjiang originates from Sichuan cuisine in which chilis are used liberally. It is made from broad bean or soybean paste, and usually contains a fair amount of chili. It is often referred to in English as "chili bean sauce".

Guilin (Kweilin) chili sauce (Guìlín làjiāojiàng 桂林辣椒醬) is made of fresh chili, garlic and fermented soybeans; it also is marketed as soy chili sauce (la jiao jiang and la dou ban jiang are not the same thing, though they look vaguely similar in the jar). Duo jiao (duò jiāo 剁椒) originates from Hunan cuisine, which is reputed to be even spicier than Sichuan cuisine. Duo means chopped, and jiao means chili. Duo jiao is made of chopped red chilis pickled in a brine solution, and has a salty and sour pickled taste; it is the key flavoring in the signature Hunan dish duòjiāo yútóu (剁椒魚頭), fish head steamed with chopped chili.

XO sauce is spicy seafood sauce from Hong Kong. It is commonly used in southern Chinese regions like Guangdong province.

Yongfeng chili sauce is a traditional fermented hot sauce.

You la jiao (油辣椒, fried chili in oil) is a Guizhou-style chili oil sauce, with fried bits of ground chili and other crispy ingredients. Chili crisp is a similar condiment mainly composed of crunchy soybeans and chili. Lao Gan Ma is a famous maker of both products.

==== Japan ====
Rāyu (chili oil) is the same as la jiao you, and is often used for dishes such as gyoza.

Yuzu koshō is a Japanese fermented paste made from chili peppers, yuzu peel, and salt.

Kōrēgūsu, made of chilis infused in awamori rice spirit, is a popular condiment to Okinawan dishes such as Okinawa soba. The word "kōrē" refers to Korea (Goguryeo).

==== Korea ====
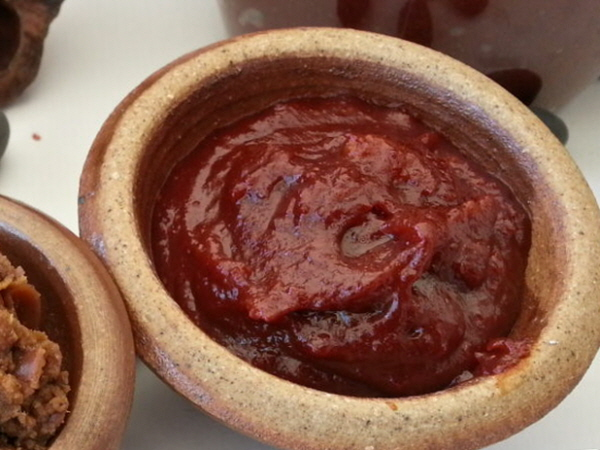
Gochujang (chili paste)

Chili oil used in Korean cuisine is made by adding gochugaru (Korean chili powder/flakes) to hot oil (usually sesame oil and/or vegetable oil) in the final stage of stir-frying and before adding water, in soup dishes like yukgaejang and sundubu-jjigae.

Dadaegi is a chili paste made by mixing ground or minced red, and dried red chili peppers (or chili powder/flakes) along with ground or minced garlic, onions, ground black pepper, salt or soy sauce, sugar, meat stock, sesame oil, and toasted sesame seeds. It is added to dishes like naengmyeon (cold noodle soup) or dwaeji-gukbap (pork soup with rice) to add spiciness.

Gochujang, or red chili paste, is a savory, sweet, and spicy fermented condiment made with chili powder, glutinous rice flour, meju (fermented soybean) powder, barley malt powder, and salt. The sweetness comes from the starch of cooked glutinous rice, cultured with saccharifying enzymes during the fermentation process. Traditionally, it has been naturally fermented over years in jangdok (earthenware) on an elevated stone platform, called jangdokdae, in the backyard.

Ssamjang is a thick, spicy paste eaten with grilled meat, often in ssam (vegetable wraps), in Korean barbecue. It is made of doenjang (soybean paste), gochujang (chili paste), sesame oil, onion, garlic, green onions, and optionally sugar.

=== Southeast Asia ===
==== Laos ====
Jaew bong is a sweet and spicy Laotian chili paste.

==== Brunei, Indonesia, Malaysia and Singapore ====
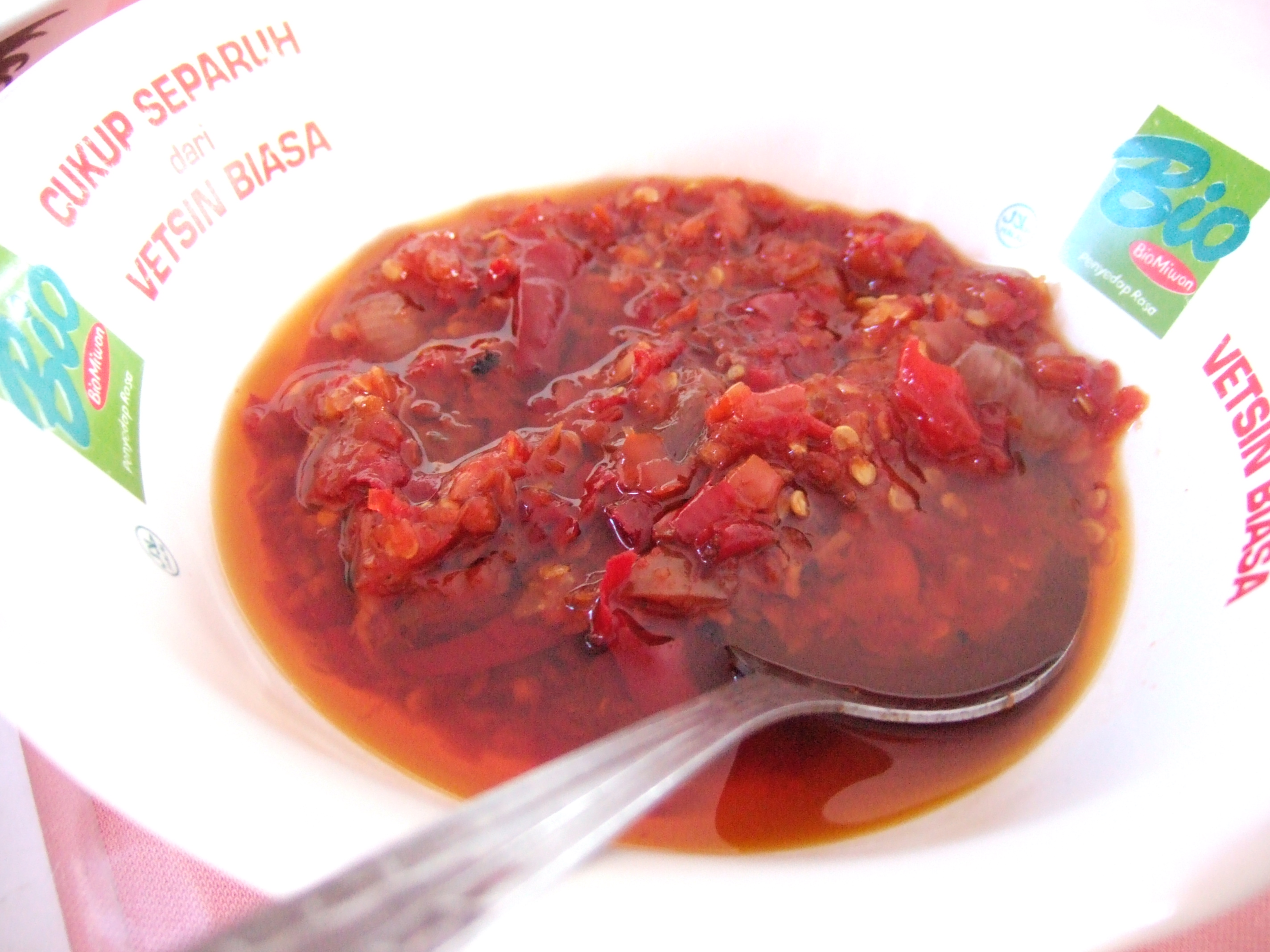
Sambal

Sambal is a generic term for many varieties of chili-based sauces popular in Brunei, Indonesia, Malaysia, Singapore and Sri Lanka. Most sambals are traditionally made using a stone pestle and mortar, according to each recipe. Nevertheless, there are some bottled mass-produced sambal brands today. Saus cabai (Indonesia) or sos cili (Malaysia and Brunei), a category of its own, uses tomato puree, chili juice, sugar, salt and some other spices or seasonings to give the spicy, but not too hot, taste. Some countryside commercial varieties use bird's eye chili (cili padi, cabai rawit or burung) together with its seeds to raise the level of heat (piquancy) of the sauce. Variants include the typical concoctions with ginger and garlic (for chicken rice) and variants that are made into a gummy consistency as with ketchup/tomato sauce.

In Indonesia, the bottled commercially available chili sauce is known as bottled saus cabai. They are also commonly known as bottled sambal. However, unlike the coarse-textured and richly flavored traditional sambal, this bottled sambal or chili sauce has an even gloppy texture similar to that of tomato sauce, and rather simple hot flavor. Unlike traditional sambal, enriched with shrimp paste, the commercial sambal sauce usually uses finely blended red chili pepper and garlic, and sometimes a little bit of sugar, without any addition of shrimp paste.

==== Philippines ====
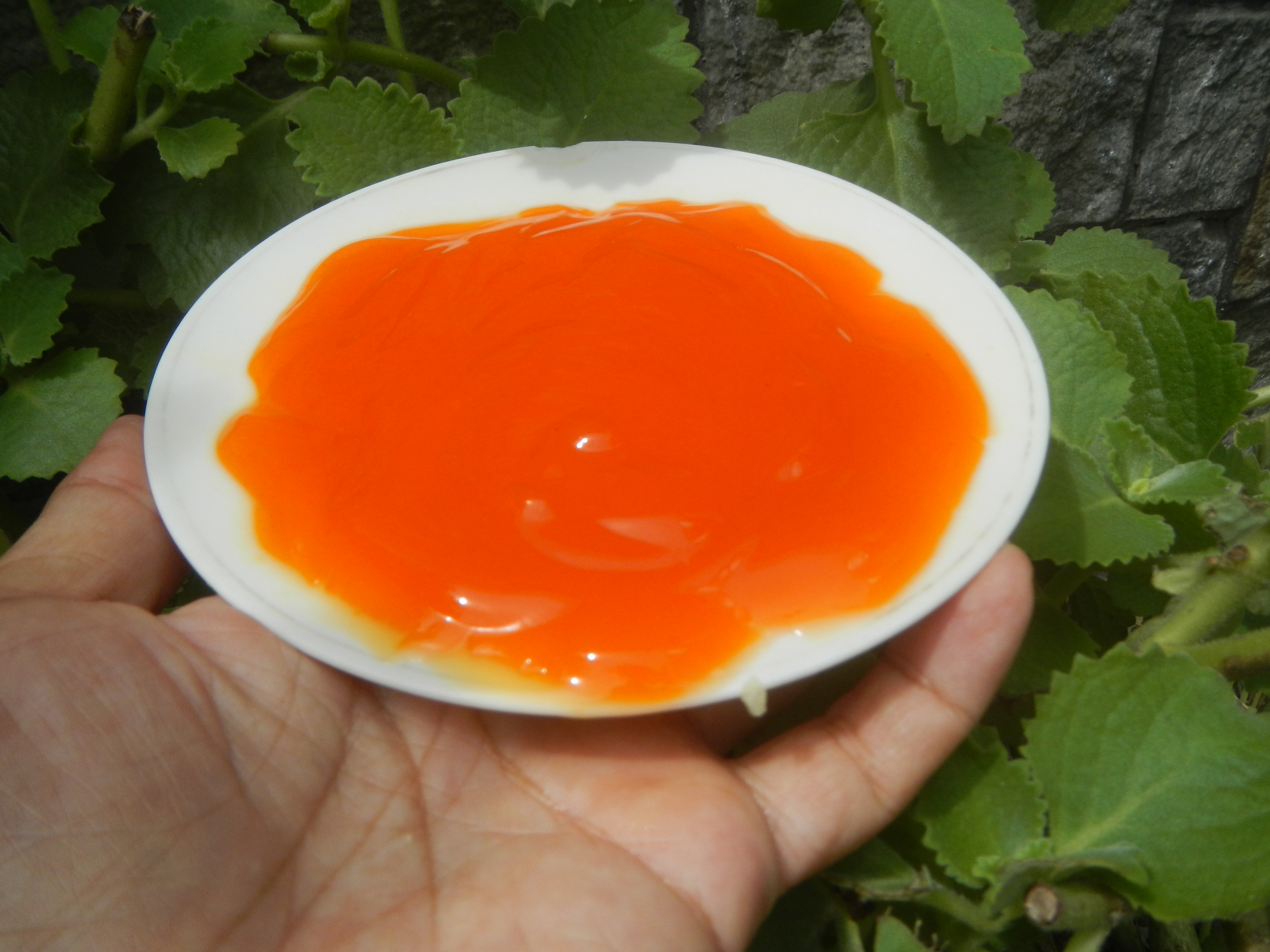
Filipino agre dulce (sweet and sour sauce)

The generic term for dipping sauces in the Philippines is sawsawan; these may or may not include chilis. Unlike sauces in other Southeast Asian regions, most sawsawan are not prepared beforehand, but are assembled at the table according to the preferences of the diner. As such, chilis in a sauce are usually optional. However, there are also native sauces and pastes which utilize chilis as main ingredients.

The most common is the traditional Filipino sweet and sour sauce known as agre dulce (or agri dulci), which is made from cornstarch, salt, sugar, labuyo chilis, and tomato or banana ketchup. It is the traditional dipping sauces of fried dishes like lumpia or okoy.

A similar sauce used for fried street food appetizers is known simply as "manong's sauce" or "fishball sauce". (Manong is a term of respect used for an older man in Tagalog, and is the most common way of addressing a street food vendor.) It is made with flour or cornstarch, sugar, soy sauce, garlic, labuyo chilis, ground pepper, and muscovado or brown sugar. Lime or lemon-flavored carbonated soft drinks may also be part of the sauce.

Another spicy condiment used for street food is "siomai sauce" or "chili garlic sauce". It is usually eaten with Philippine siomai. It uses minced labuyo chilis, garlic, and powdered dried shrimp or finely minced meat simmered in water and then oil. It takes on a flavor similar to Chinese chili oil-infused dim sum sauces, which are its ultimate origin. It is typically spritzed with calamansi before eating.

Among the Maranao people, another notable condiment is palapa, a very spicy condiment made from sakurab (native scallions), ginger, turmeric, and labuyo chilis. It is an ubiquitous accompaniment to Maranao meals.

==== Thailand ====
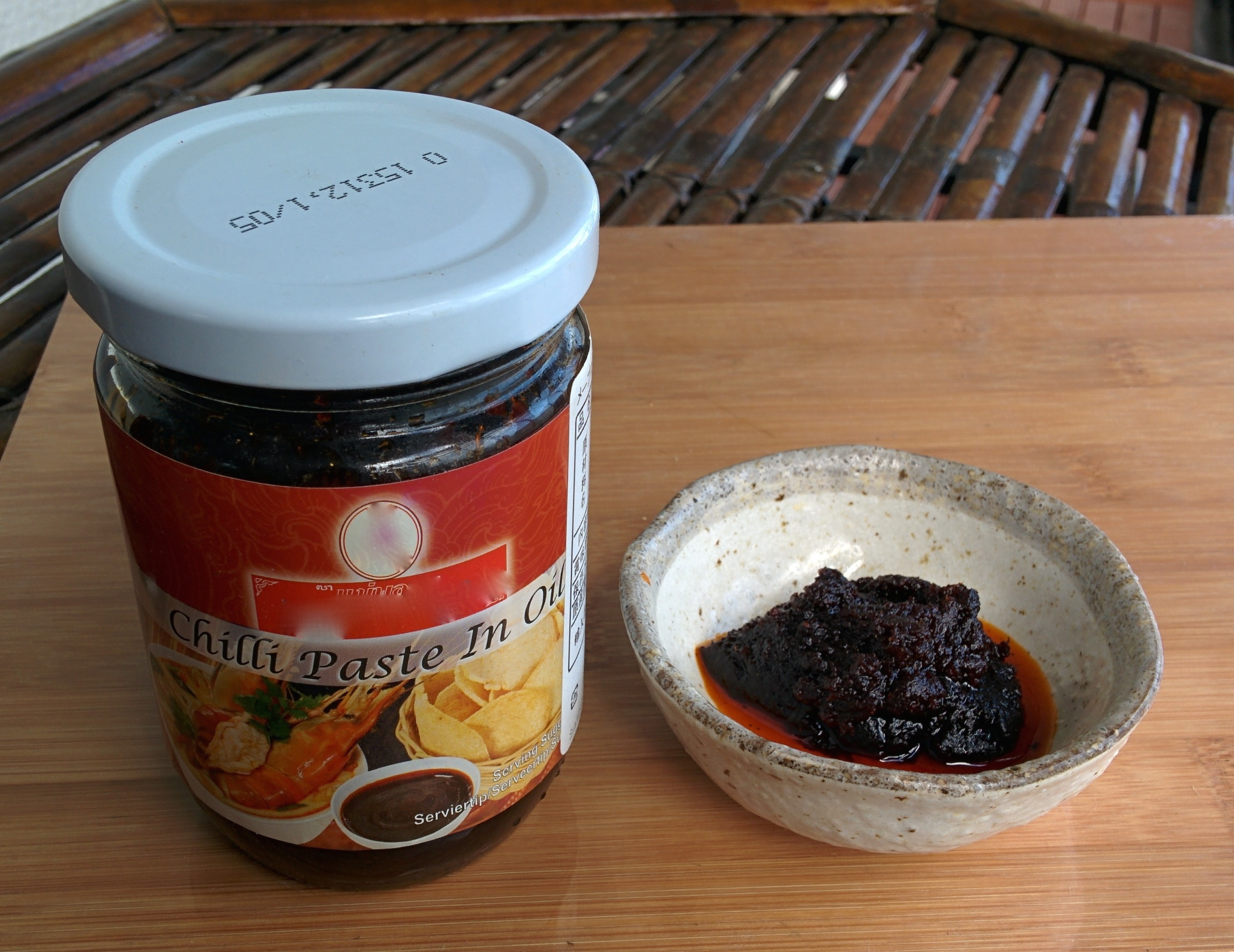
Nam phrik phao ("chili jam")

Thais put raw chilies (rather than chili sauces) on a very wide variety of foods, but do also use chili sauces, both as condiments and as recipe ingredients.

Nam phrik is the generic name for a Thai chili dip or paste. A Thai cookbook from 1974 lists over 100 recipes for such dips and pastes. Nam phrik phao (roasted chili paste), nam phrik num (pounded grilled green chili paste) and nam phrik kapi (chili paste made with fermented shrimp paste) are some of the more well-known varieties. Many Thai dipping sauces (nam chim) contain chili peppers. Nam chim chaeo uses ground dried chili peppers to achieve its spiciness. Available worldwide is nam chim kai, also known as "chili sauce for chicken" or "Thai sweet chili sauce". Phrik nam pla is fish sauce (nam pla) with chopped raw chilies, lime juice and sometimes garlic.

Sriracha sauce is a type of hot sauce or chili sauce made from a paste of chili peppers, distilled vinegar, garlic, sugar, and salt. It is named after the coastal city of Si Racha, in the Chonburi Province of Eastern Thailand, where it was possibly first produced for dishes served at local seafood restaurants.

A type of chili sauce is Thai sweet chili sauce, which is used as a dipping sauce, a marinade, and for cooking, such as in stir-fried dishes. The company Mae Ploy is a major manufacturer of Thai sweet chili sauce. Most major supermarket chain stores in North America carry Thai sweet chili sauce. Sweet chili sauce is used in Thai cuisine, and is also sometimes used in the preparation of sushi.

Some versions of nam phrik, a range of chili-based hot sauces typical of Thai cuisine, are sweetened with sugar.

==== Vietnam ====
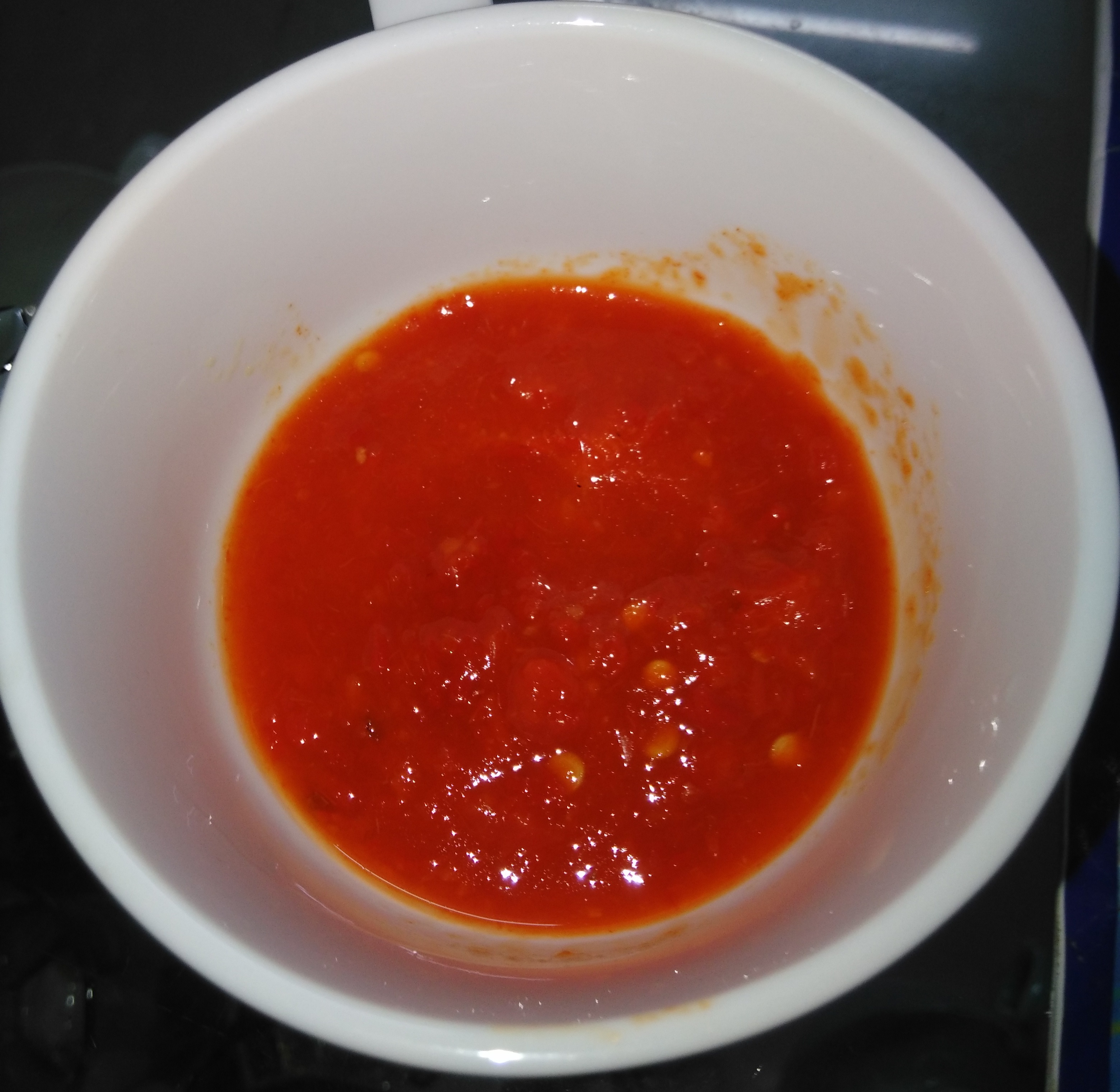
Homemade tương ớt (chili sauce)

Vietnamese tương ớt (chili sauce) is made from sun-ripened chili peppers, vinegar, garlic, sugar and salt. It is very popular in Vietnamese cuisine, often used in a wide variety of foods.

=== South Asia ===
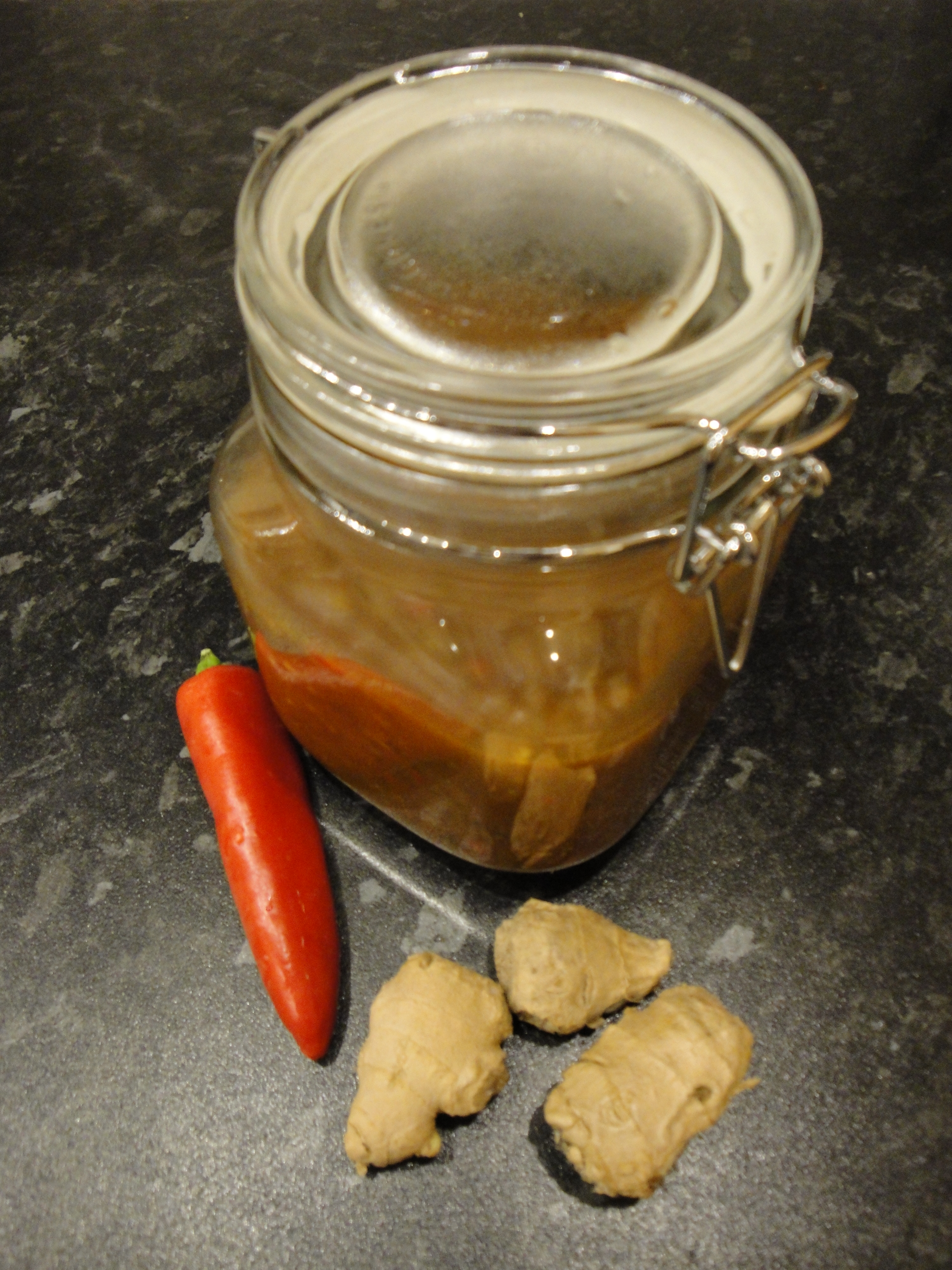
Apple chili chutney

Chili (Hindi: mirch), fresh, semi-dried or dried, is a crucial ingredient throughout South Asia, with multiple strains having arrived through Portuguese trade from the sixteenth century. Many varieties are now popular in different parts of the sub-continent such as Naga chilli from Nagaland, Chamba Chukh from Himachal Pradesh, Guntur chilli from Andhra Pradesh, and Jwala chilli from Gujarat, among others. Hot sauces proper, however, were not common until recent decades, as varieties such as bhut jolokia and naga morich attained global fame.

In Nepal, nun-khursani is a popular condiment made with salt and chilli peppers like akabare on a grinding stone called a silauto. This is often used as a chutney and can be eaten with many meals and snacks like dal bhat, roasted corn, grilled chicken, cucumbers, oranges, and more.

Chilli chutney is an Indian chilli pepper condiment with spices and herbs.

=== Middle East and North Africa ===
==== Levant and Arabia ====
Shatta (Arabic: شطة shaṭṭah) is a popular hot sauce made from wholly grounded fresh chili peppers by mixing them with oil (usually olive). Vinegar, garlic, or other spices are commonly added. There are two varieties of shatta: green and red. The red variety is made with tomatoes. It is made from piri piri or similarly hot peppers. The degree of hotness varies according to the type of chili used and preference of the maker (homemade shatta is usually hotter than commercial brands). It is commonly used in falafel sandwiches, hummus dishes, or as a condiment. Muhammara (Arabic: محمرة muḥammarah) is a hot pepper dip made from Aleppo pepper, ground walnuts, dried bread, and olive oil. Other spices and flavorings may be added. It is served as a dip or spread for bread or as a sauce for fish and meat. The dish is also known in Turkey, where it may be called acuka.

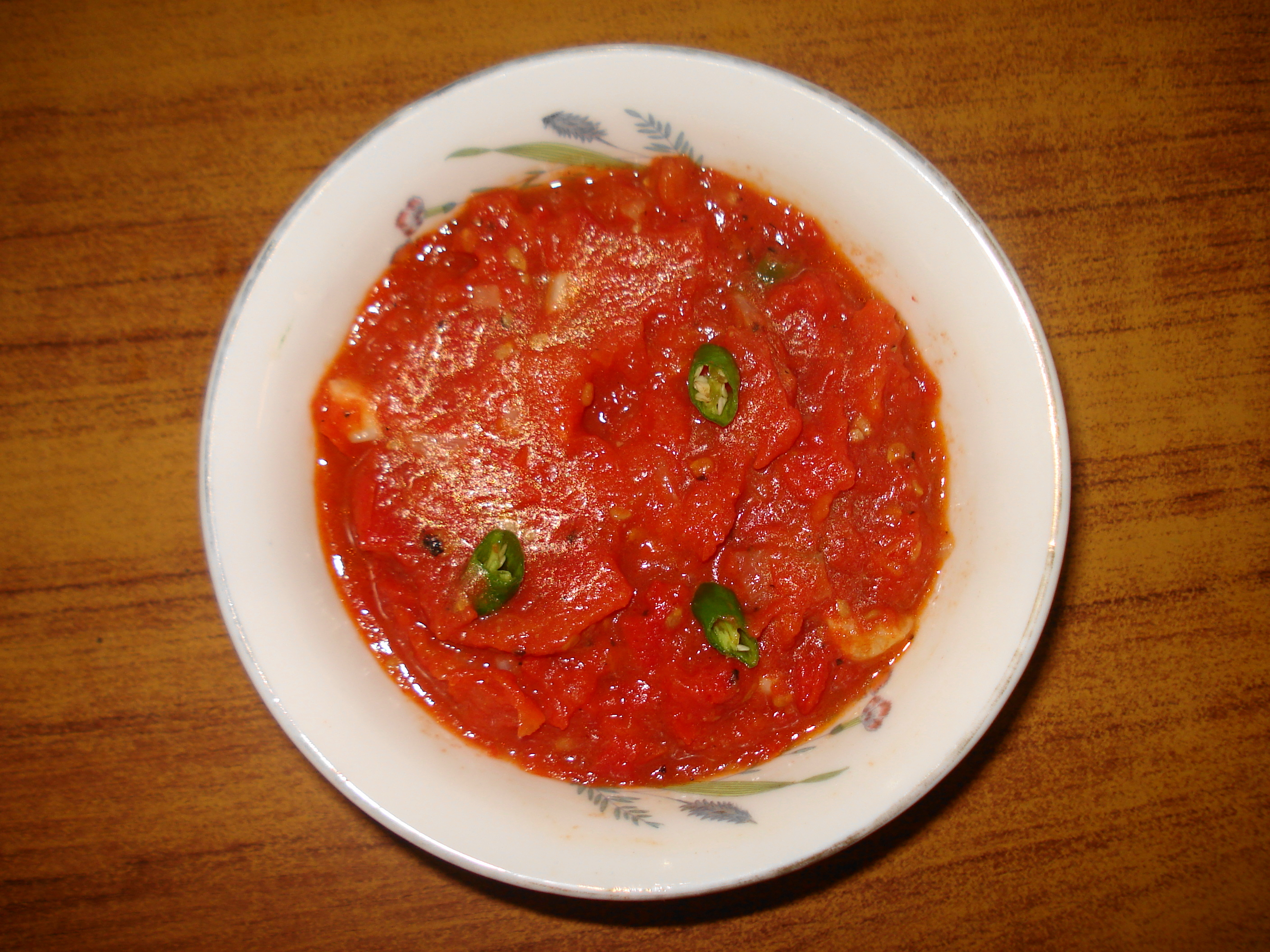
Dakkous, a popular chili sauce in the Persian Gulf region

Daqoos (Arabic: دقوس, romanized: daqūs), sometimes dakkous or daqqus, is a chili tomato sauce common in Eastern Arabian cuisine served alongside rice dishes like mandi and kabsa. It is typically made of roasted tomatoes, garlic, and chili pepper. Common additions include various herbs and spices; ingredients may vary by region. It is also used in western Saudi (Hejaz), where it is called duggus.

==== Maghreb ====
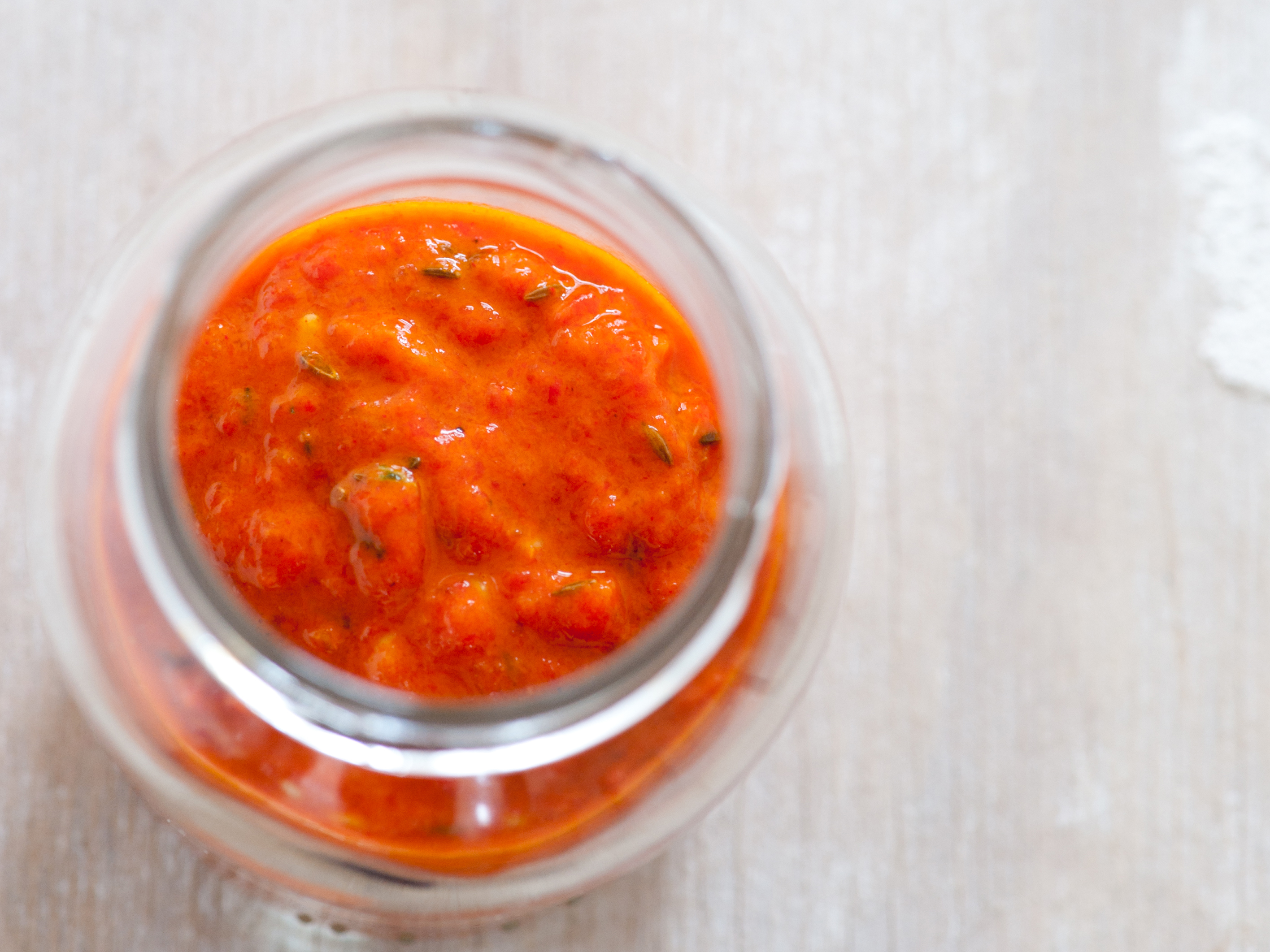
Harissa

Harissa is a popular hot sauce used in Tunisia and elsewhere in the Maghreb (especially Algeria, Libya and Morocco). It is usually made from ground red birdseye chili peppers with olive oil, garlic, cumin and coriander although caraway is sometimes used instead of cumin and recipes vary. The sauce is of a dark red grainy texture. It is sometimes spread on bread rolls but also used as a condiment with a variety of meals. Tunisian Harissa is much hotter than that found in neighboring countries. Cap Bon is a popular brand of Harissa. Harissa is often sold in tin cans. Harissa is also popular in Israel, on account of immigration of Maghrebi Jews.

==== Turkey ====
Biber salçası is a Turkish red pepper paste.

==== Yemen ====
Sahawiq is produced by grinding fresh peppers with garlic, coriander, and sometimes other ingredients. It is popular both in Yemen and in Israel, where it was brought by Yemenite Jews, and where it is called סחוג s'khug.

=== Africa ===
==== Ethiopia ====
Awaze is an Ethiopian chili paste.

==== Malawi ====
Nali Sauce is a style of piri piri chili sauce.

==== Somalia ====
Shigni is a Somali chili sauce or chutney, made from chili peppers, onion, garlic, tomato, lemon juice, cilantro and so on.

==== South Africa ====
Peri Peri sauce is a style of piri piri chili sauce used by Nando's Chicken fast food restaurants.

==== Tunisia ====
Harissa is a chili paste based on roasted red peppers and olive oil, seasoned with garlic, coriander seed and other herbs.

=== Europe ===
Adjika Mingrelian and Adjika Abkhazian (Georgia)

==== Hungary ====
Erős Pista (lit. "Strong Steve") and Piros Arany (lit. "Red Gold") hot pepper paste, both made from minced hot paprika (Capsicum annuum L.); paprika is commonly grown in Hungary and both hot and mild paprika are in common usage there.

==== Portugal ====
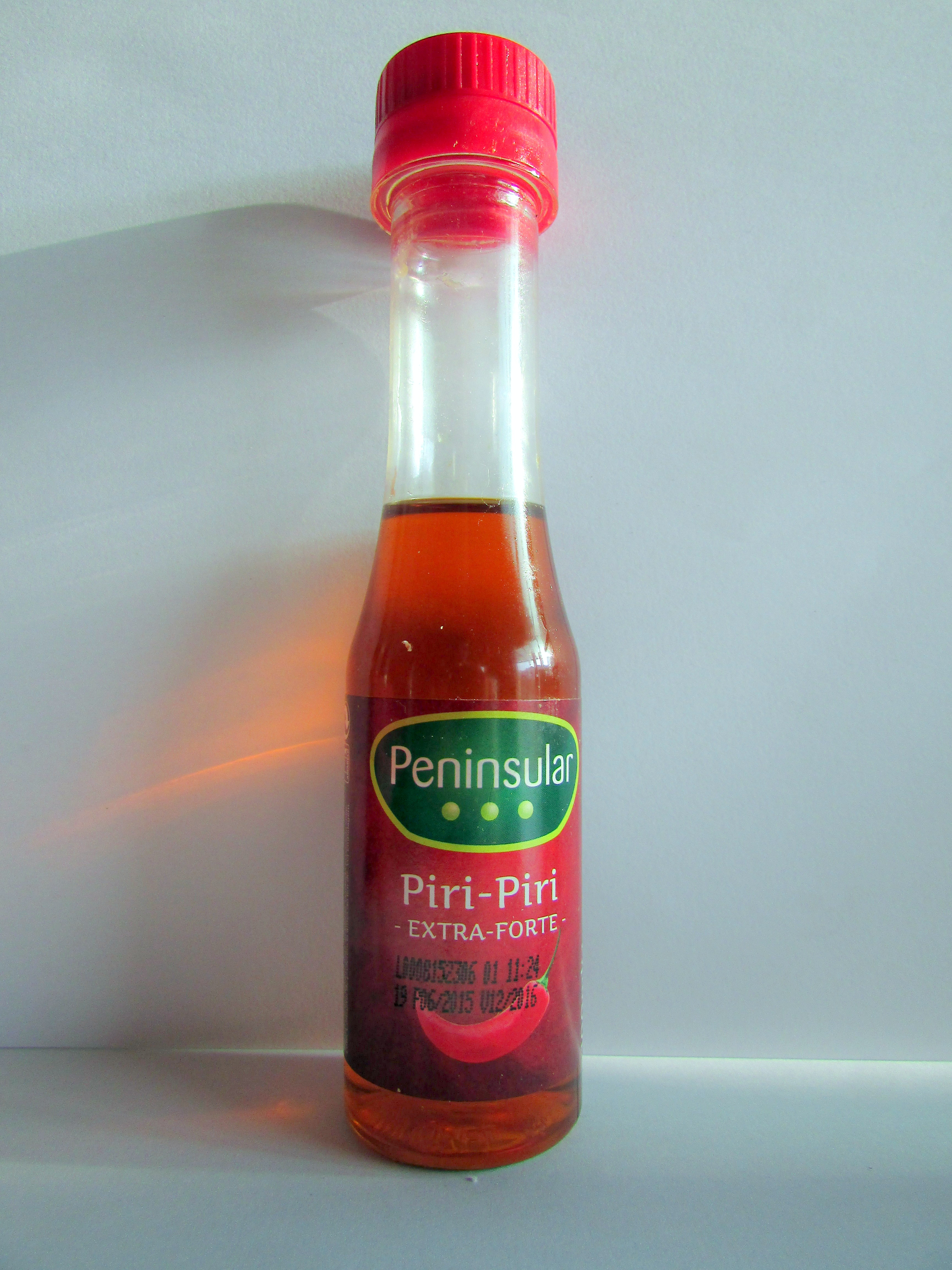
Piri piri sauce

Piri piri is the popular chili sauce; the term "piri piri" came to English through the Portuguese language through contact with Portuguese Mozambique.

=== Oceania ===
==== New Zealand ====
Many influences reflecting the increasingly diverse ethnicity of its population. Common styles available in supermarkets are:

- Sweet chili sauce – a Thai style sweet dipping sauce (debatable as to whether this can be called a hot sauce).
- Hot sauces based on North and Latin American types (Tabasco, Huffman, Kaitaia Fire are most commonly available but Mexican and Peruvian branded sauces may also be found).
- Malaysian chili sauces with Indian influence.
- Peri Peri sauce is a Portuguese style piri piri sauce that is also common in South Africa.
- Chinese style sauces such as black bean and chili.

==== Pacific Islands ====
The Pacific Islands are influenced by Asian and European cuisines. Hot chili sauce is a thick Chinese style sauce. Sweet chili sauce is a Thai style sweet dipping sauce. Peri Peri sauce is a Portuguese style piri piri sauce.

=== Americas ===
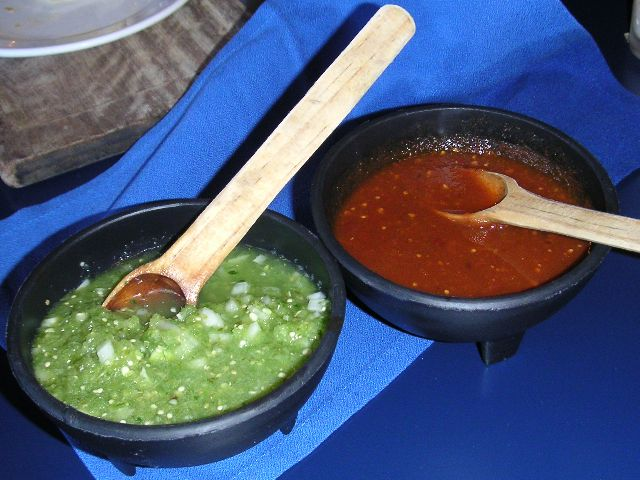
Mexican salsa (sauce or garnish)

==== Andes ====
Ají is a spicy sauce that often contains tomatoes, cilantro (coriander), ají pepper, onions, and water. It is prepared in Andean countries such as Bolivia, Colombia, and Peru.

Peru and Bolivian medium hot, frutal rocoto sauces are popular.

==== Caribbean ====
Hot sauces are used extensively in the Caribbean.

==== Mexico ====
Mexican chili sauces are known as salsa (literally "sauce").

==== United States ====
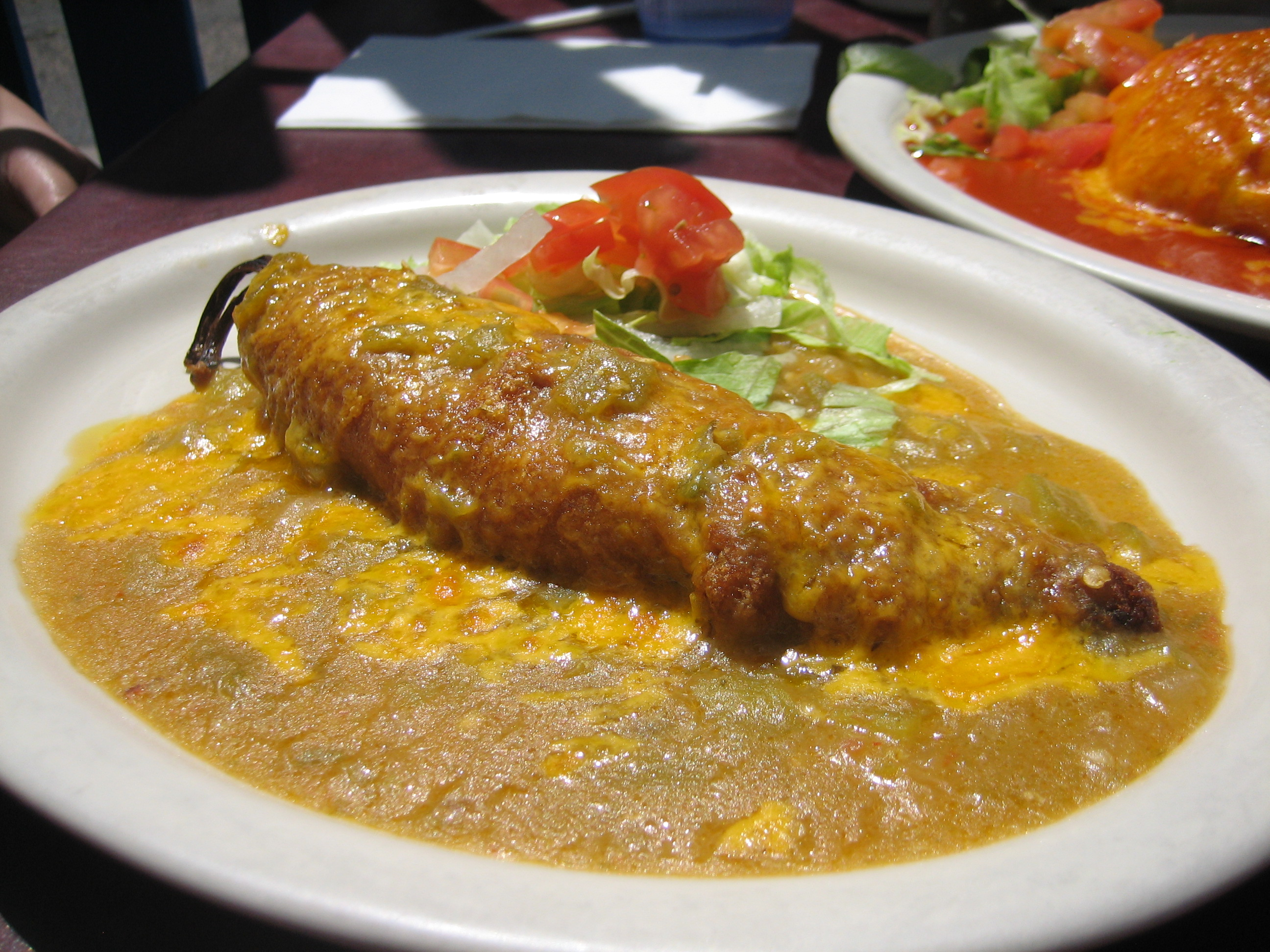
Chile relleno "smothered" with green chile sauce

Pepper jelly is made in the United States. Green chile sauce and red chile sauce are popular ingredients in New Mexican cuisine.

== See also ==
- Chutney
- Curry paste
- Pepper jelly
- List of condiments
- List of hot sauces
