= Sweet chili sauce =

Condiment primarily used as a dip

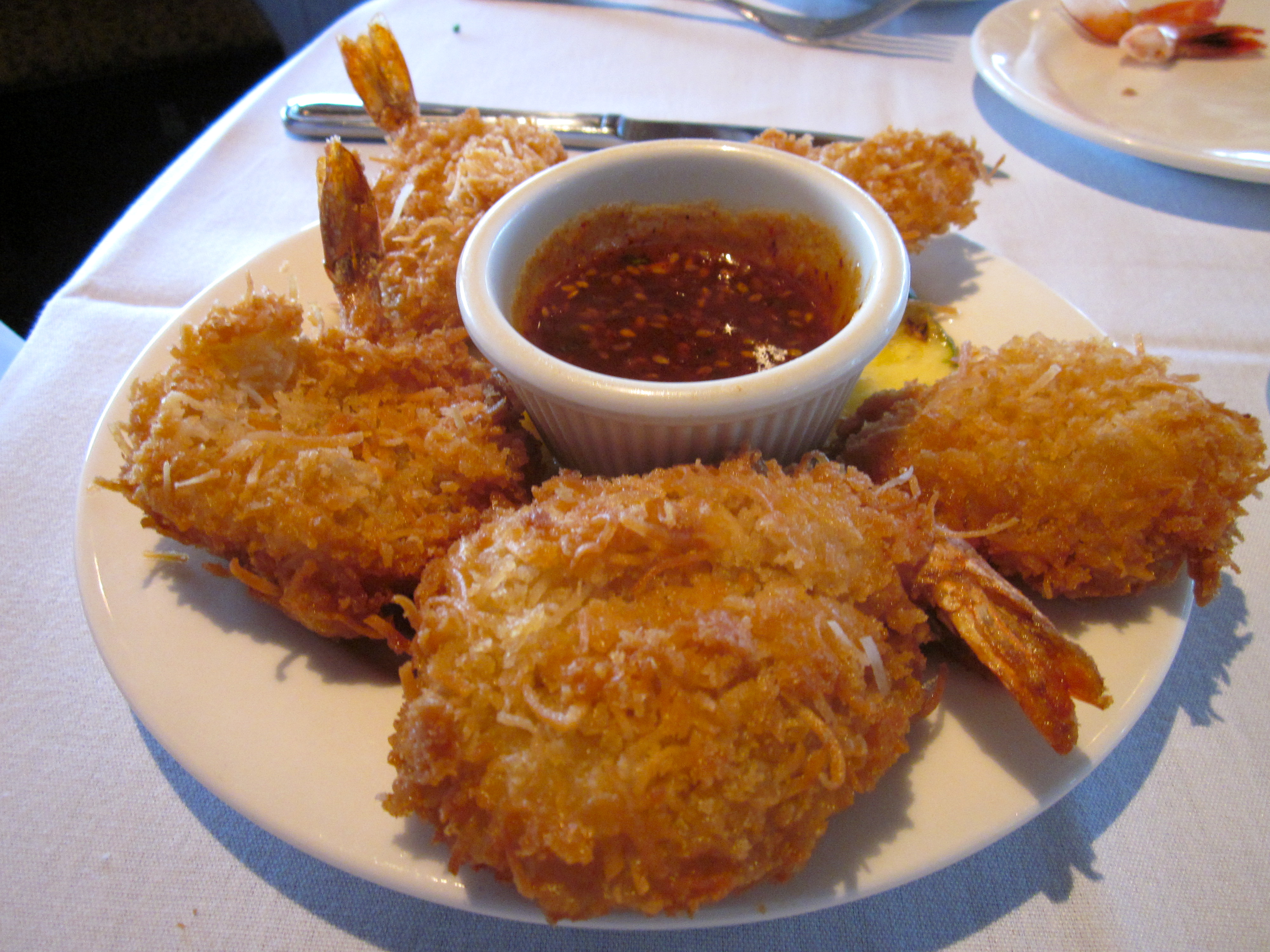
- Coconut shrimp with sweet chili sauce
- Alternative names: Sweet Thai chili sauce
- Type: Sauce
- Place of origin: Thailand
- Main ingredients: Red chili peppers
- Ingredients generally used: Rice wine vinegar, garlic, fish sauce, fruit or refined sugar or honey

Sweet chili sauce (also known as sweet Thai chili sauce), known as nam chim kai in Thailand (Thai: น้ำจิ้มไก่; lit. 'dipping sauce for chicken'), is a popular chili sauce condiment in Thai, Afghan, Malaysian, and Western cuisine. It is commonly made with red chili peppers (often Fresno chile, Thai or red jalapeños), rice wine vinegar, sometimes garlic, sometimes fish sauce, and a sweetening ingredient such as fruit or a refined sugar or honey.

It is popular as a dip in European Chinese restaurant dishes such as prawn toast, egg rolls, lettuce wraps, chicken wings and spring rolls. It can also be purchased in bottle form. In Australia, New Zealand, Europe, Canada, and the United States, "sweet Thai chili sauce" is available as a condiment at many takeaway stores and supermarkets.

== See also ==
- Chili oil, a condiment made from chili and oil that adds heat to Asian dishes
- Nước chấm, Vietnamese sauce that has similar ingredients to sweet chili sauce but is more spicy and vinegary, and less sweet and thick in texture
- Nam phrik, various Thai chili pastes
- Sriracha, a Thai condiment sauce made from chilies that adds heat to a dish
- List of dips
- List of sauces
