= Nam phrik num =

Thai dish

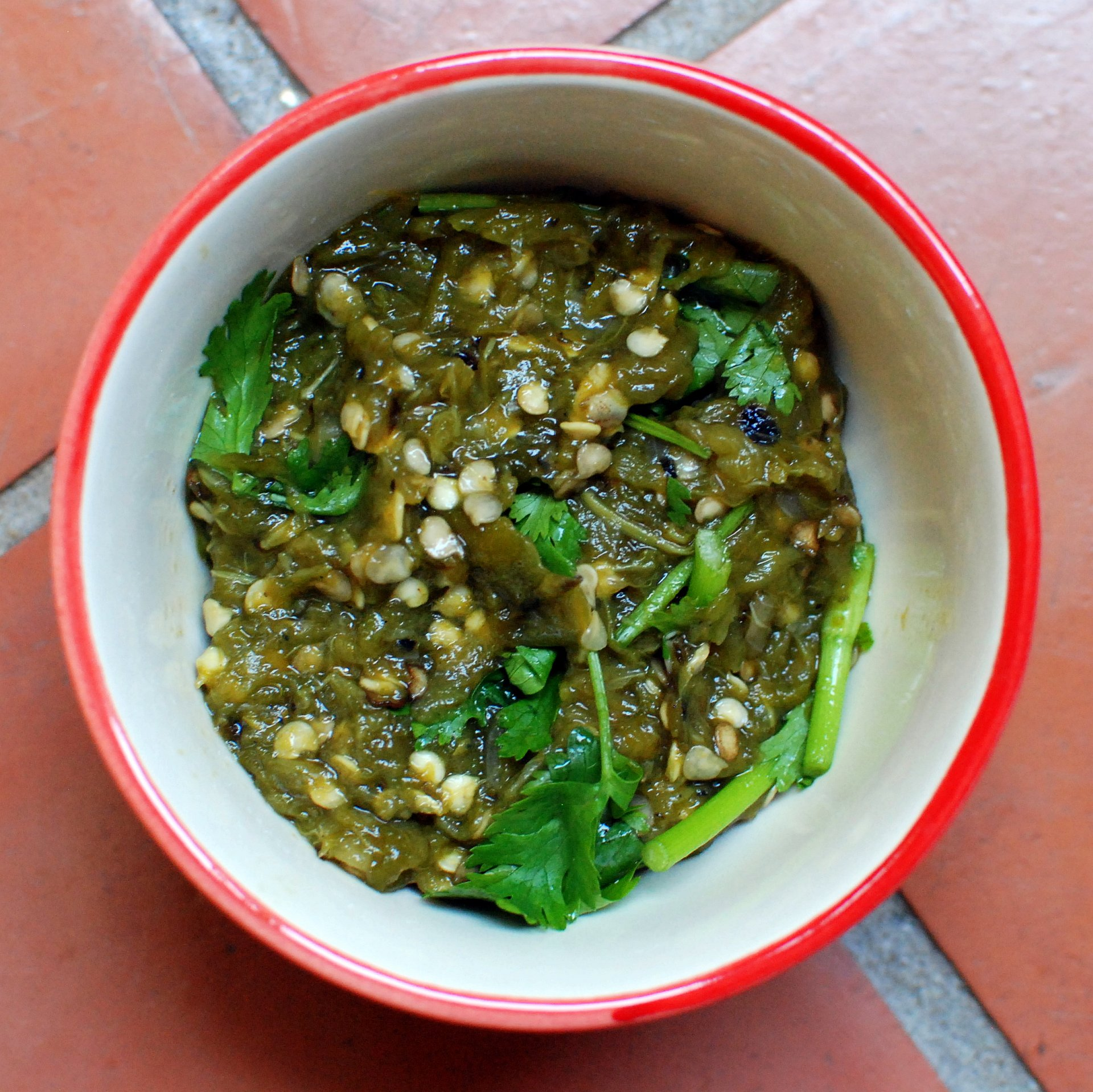
- Nam phrik num (foreground)
- Type: Dip or chili sauce
- Place of origin: Laos
- Region or state: Southeast Asia
- Created by: Lao
- Main ingredients: Chili peppers

Nam Phrik Num (Thai: น้ำพริกหนุ่ม, pronounced [nám pʰrík nùm]) is a kind of “Nam phrik” of Lao origin. It is commonly served in a small bowl or saucer placed by the main dish as a condiment or a dip, mostly for uncooked or boiled vegetables, sticky rice, or pork crackling.

== Nutritional content ==
A serving size of 100 grams (3.5 ounces) of Nam Phrik Num has 56.61 kilocalories, calories from fat 6.21 kilocalories, 0.69 grams (0.024 ounces) fat, 3.31 grams (0.117 ounces) protein, 9.29 grams (0.328 ounces) carbohydrate, and 4.97 grams (0.175 ounces) fiber. Nam Phrik Num gives low level of fat and energy, but high level of fiber. The number of phenolic compounds in Nam phrik num is 499 mg GAE/100 g and it can neutralize free radicals (DPPH antioxidant activity; IC50) 0.29 grams per liter.
