= Nam phrik long ruea =

Thai dish

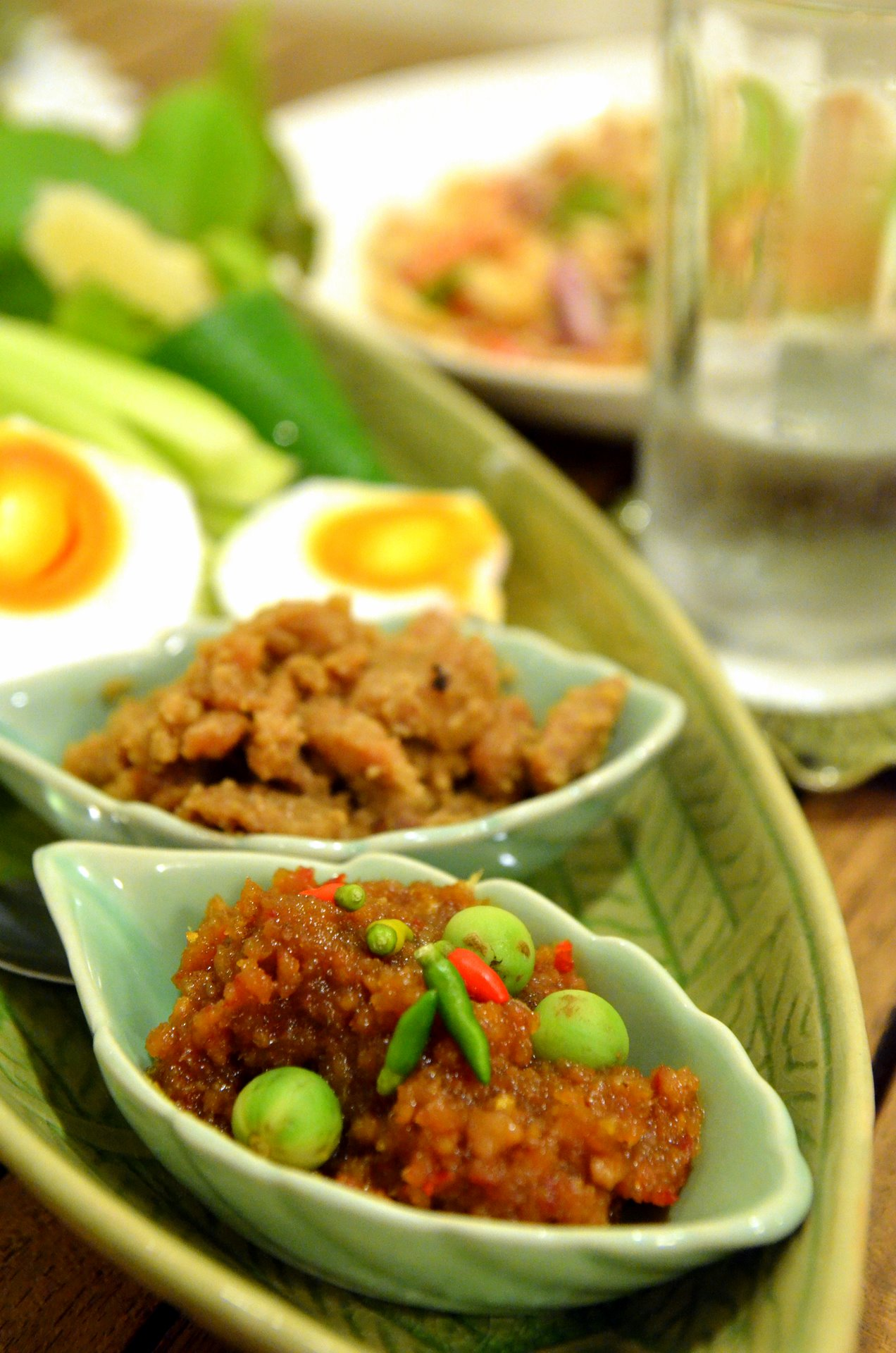
- Nam phrik long ruea (foreground)
- Type: Dip or chili sauce
- Place of origin: Thailand
- Region or state: Southeast Asia
- Created by: Thai people
- Main ingredients: Chili peppers

Nam phrik long ruea (Thai: น้ำพริกลงเรือ; pronounced [nám pʰrík lōŋ rɯa̯]) is a side dish in Thai cuisine, a kind of fried nam phrik (dipping sauce) that is normally eaten with vegetables.

It was supposedly first served in the era of King Rama V (1868–1910) on a boat trip to the Suan Snanndha palace. The cooks would fry the nam phrik with various leftover ingredients in the kitchen, such as pla duk fu (crispy catfish), sweet pork and vegetables.

== History ==
Suan Sunanddha Palace was the first place to cook the dish. Every royal dish that is served in the palace is said to have originated there. Queen Sadub Ladawan is supposed to have created the recipe for an onboard picnic of two sister princesses – Sohmdet Ying Naawy (สมเด็จหญิงน้อย) and Sohmdet Ying Glaang (สมเด็จหญิงกลาง). This dish was written down by Mawm Luang Neuang Ninrat (หม่อมหลวงเนื่อง นิลรัตน์).
