= Piarun =

Piarun may refer to:

- Perun, the Slavic god of thunder and lightning
- Piaparan, a cooking process using spicy grated coconut from the Maranao people of the Philippines
