= Erős Pista =

Second most popular chili sauce in Hungary

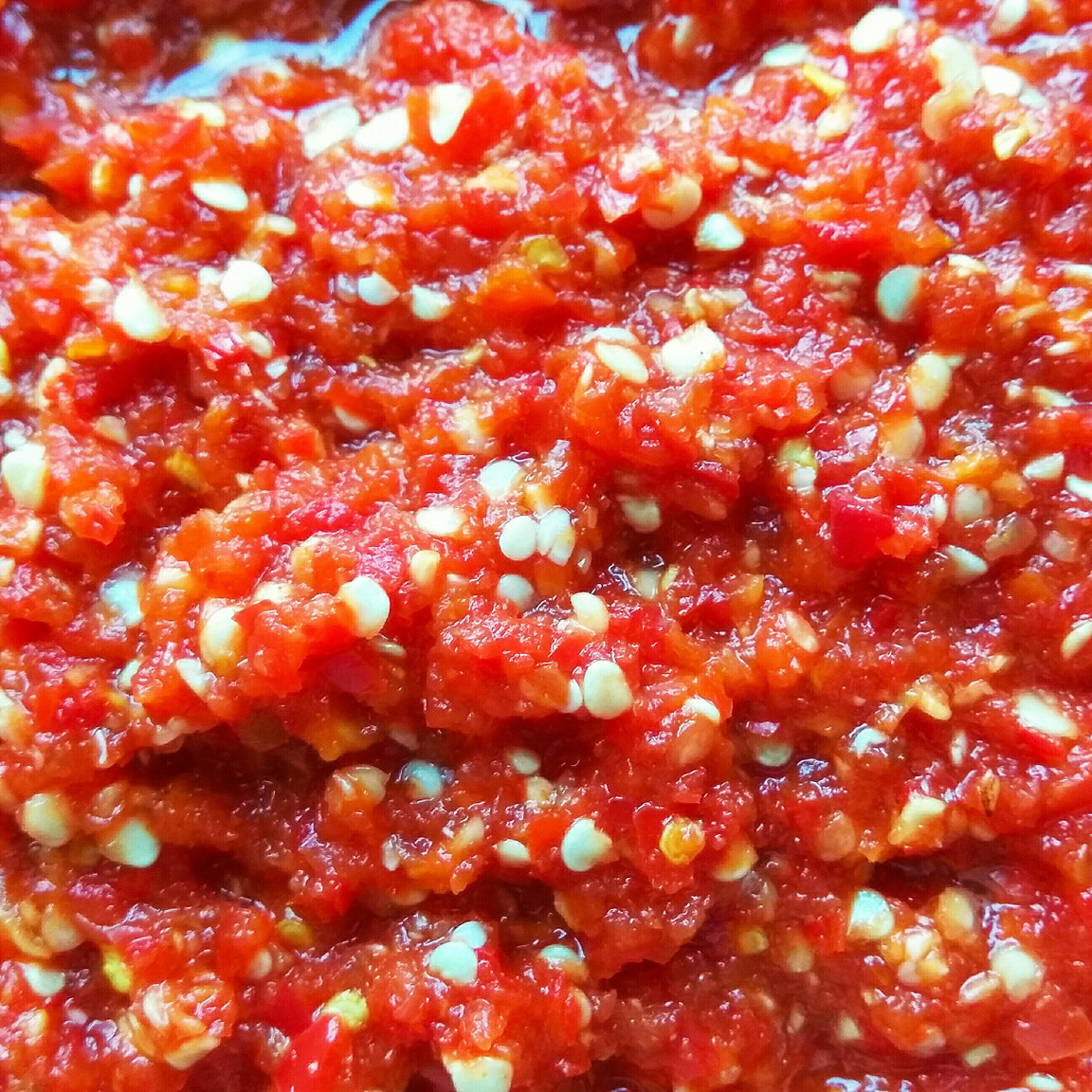
Homemade Erős Pista

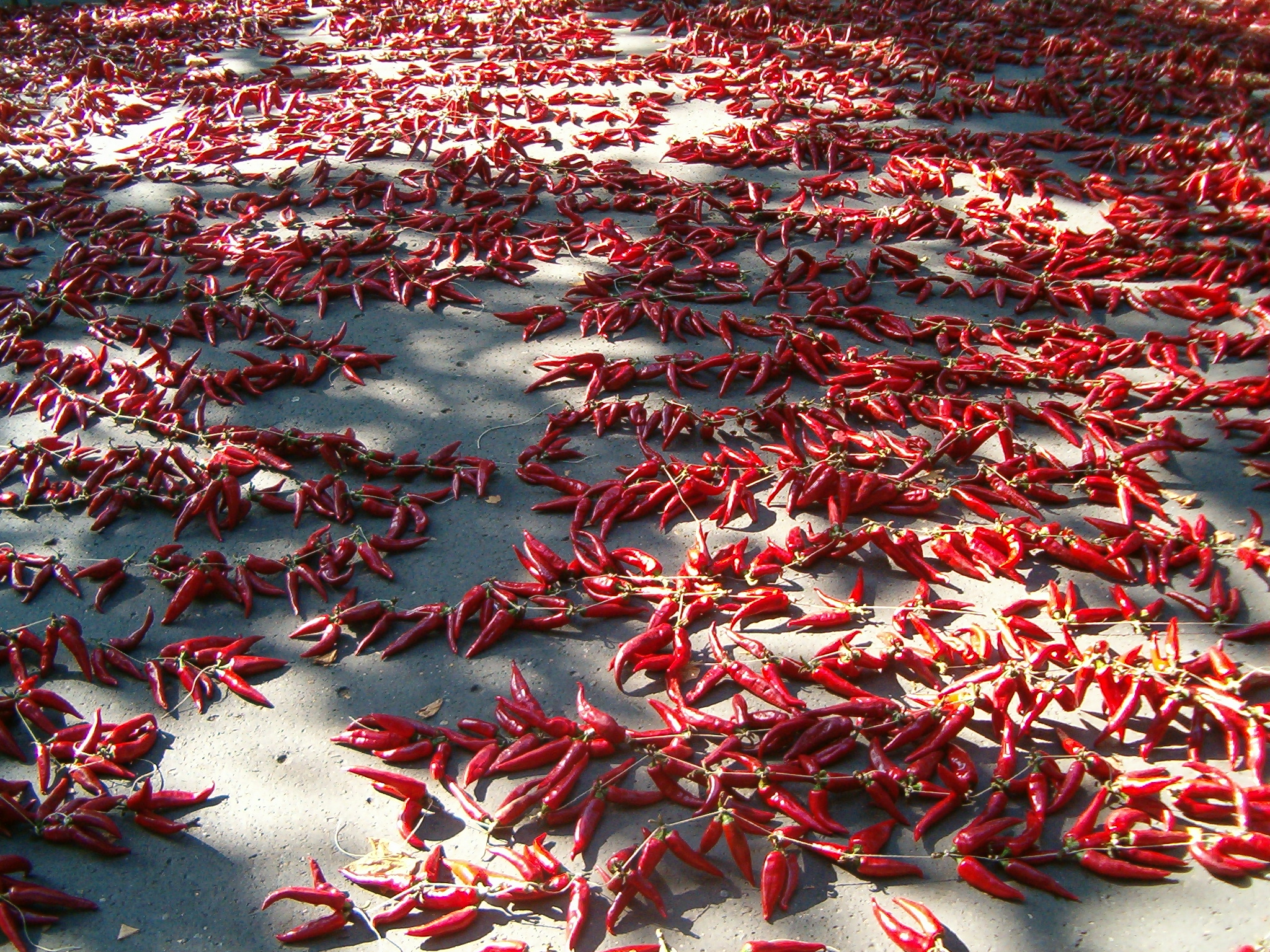
The main ingredient: hot paprika

Erős Pista (Hungarian: [ˈɛrøːʃ ˈpiʃtɒ], lit. 'Strong Steve') is a Hungarian chili sauce produced by Univer. Erős Pista is made from coarsely minced hot paprika and salt; containing nothing more perishable, it can be stored for a year in a refrigerator. It is also produced in a paste form.

Other versions of the sauce exist: Édes Anna (Sweet Anna), which is less spicy, and Haragos Pista (Angry Steve), which is more.

== Usage ==
Hungarians use Erős Pista in, for example, lecsó (a vegetable ragout), csirkepaprikás (chicken paprikash) and soups like halászlé (fisherman's soup) and gulyás (goulash).

== See also ==
- Hungarian cuisine
