= Chamba chukh =

Type of hot chilli

Chamba Chukh
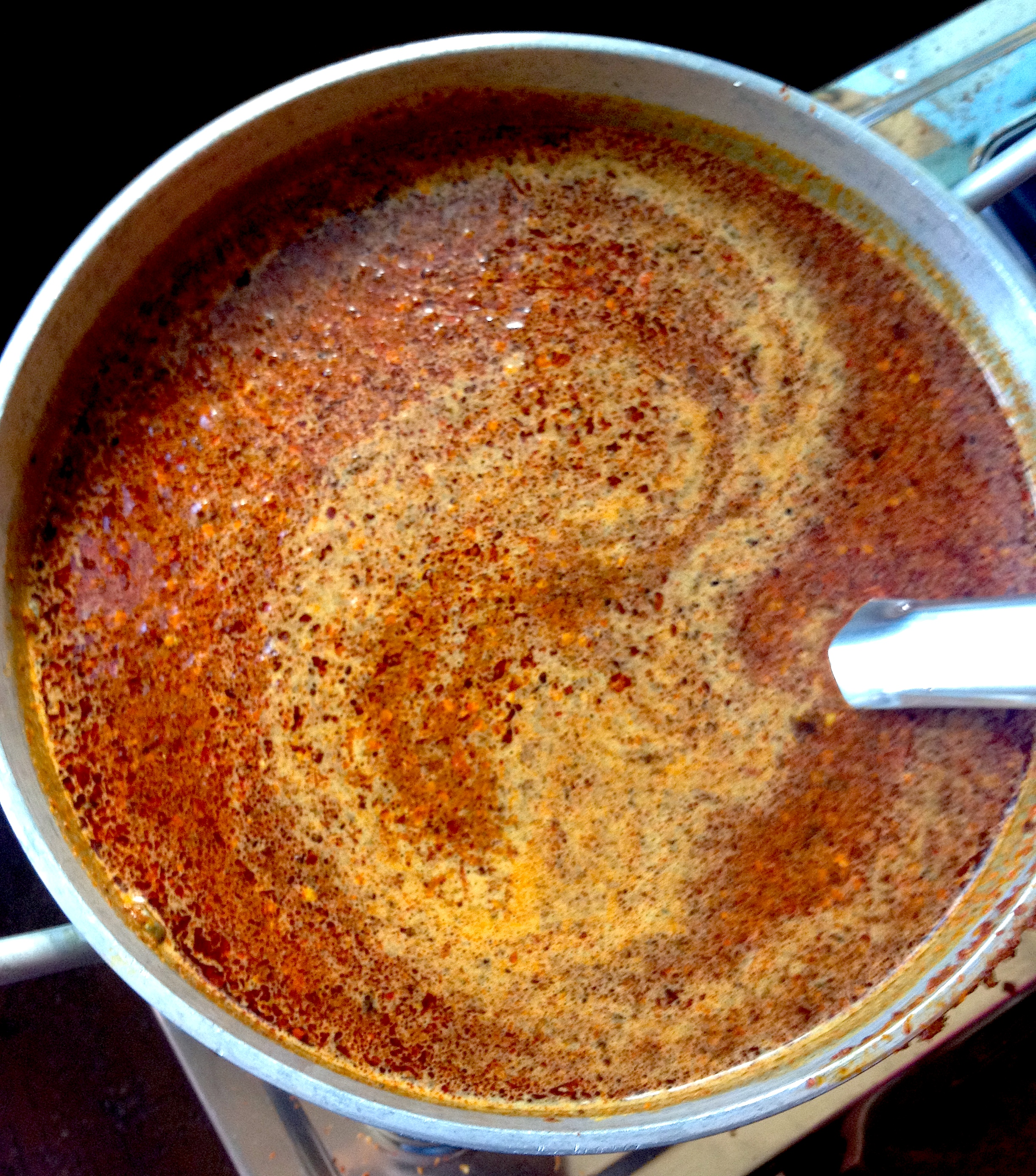
- Chamba Chukh preparation
- Place of origin: India
- Region or state: Himachal Pradesh

Chamba Chukh is a type of hot chilli prepared from locally grown chillies in the Chamba Valley of the Northern Indian State of Himachal Pradesh. The recipe is a generations old traditional preparation made from sun-dried red chillies or fresh green chillies. Blended with citrus extract from a local fruit, the Chamba Chukh preparation is a cooked chilli sauce and chili pepper paste. Made by women in their kitchens in different parts of the Chamba district, the preparation has been highly regarded in the local region and in adjoining areas. Chamba Chukh is now gradually making its way into a broader market.

== Preparation and use ==
This hot chilli recipe is made from locally grown chillies in the Chamba area, mixed with extract from a local citrus fruit and cooked with Indian spices. It is usually prepared in mustard oil which is commonly used in Indian cooking. The red chilli version of the preparation is usually made from sun-dried chilli peppers and has a smokey flavour.

Chukh is usually had as a condiment to go with meals or snacks but also used in cooking. It is consumed as a hot sauce, pickle, and as a food additive.

== Recent developments ==
The District Rural Development Agency (DRDA) in Chamba with the Government of Himachal Pradesh have designated officers to help women groups in the village communities to standardise production and help them produce this chilli sauce per approved recipes.

As of December 2020, the government of Himachal Pradesh sought a geographical indication for chamba chukh.

Some variants such as Ginger Chukh and Garlic Chukh are common among most brands, though some of the makers have also recently started to produce their own specific formulations such as Honey Chukh, Dry Fruit Chukh, etc.
