= Nali Sauce =

Popular sauce from Malawi

Nali Limited
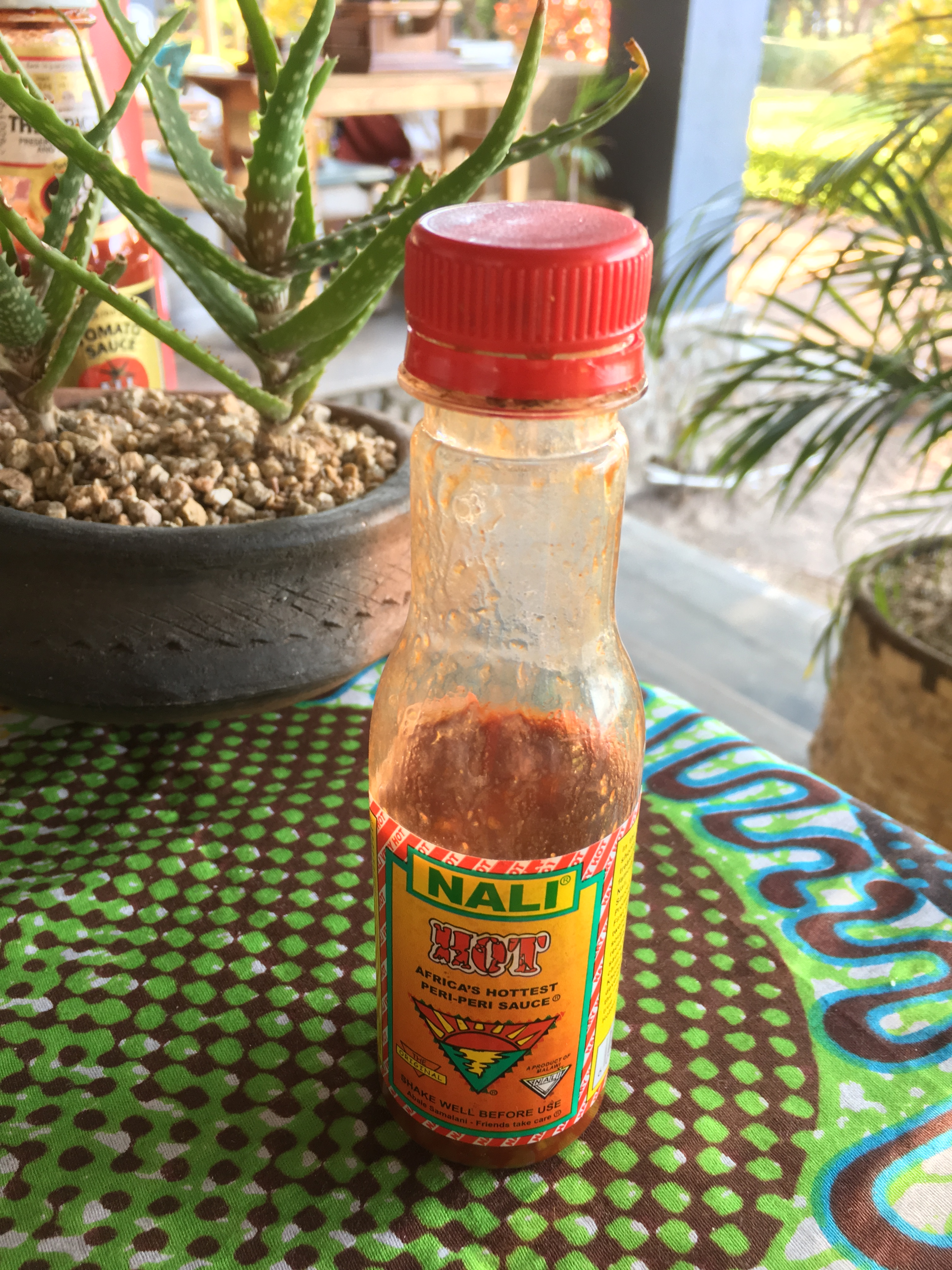
- A bottle of Nali Hot Sauce in Monkey Bay
- Type: Private (family-owned)
- Industry: Food processing
- Founded: 1974
- Founder: Nali-lo Khoromana
- Headquarters: Limbe, Blantyre District–Malawi
- Products: Pepper sauce and other condiments
- Revenue: $800,000.00
- Number of employees: About 65 (2025)
- Website: naligroup.mw

Nali Sauce is a popular sauce from Malawi dubbed, "'Africa's hottest peri-peri sauce'. It is one of Malawi's most popular sauces. The Nali sauce brands have attained cult status with chili lovers both in Malawi and throughout the world for their hotness and taste. The heat level of Nali sauce is approximately 175,000 scoville heat units.

Nali is made from peri-peri sauce derived from Malawian bird's eye chillies, which are considered among the hottest in Africa. They have been produced by Nali Limited since the 1970s. There are currently 8 different flavors of Nali Sauces: Hot, Gold, Garlic, Ginger, Curry Masala, Chicken BBQ, Steak BBQ and Kambuzi. The label on each bottle comes with a warning in both English and Chichewa that reads, "Abale Samalani", which means Friends, take care.

Nali has a strong presence in Zambia, Zimbabwe, Tanzania, Kenya, Mozambique and South Africa.

== History ==
Nali Limited was founded in 1974 in Limbe, Malawi, by Alford Nali-lo Khoromana in the Thyolo District. Initially established as a proprietorship, the company was incorporated as Nali Farms Limited on 15 December 1983. It later changed to Nali Limited on 12 November 1985. Since the early 1970s, Nali has been engaged in the growing and export of spices, including the popular Birds Eye chilies that are mostly found in Africa. Over the years, Nali has grown into a successful commercial enterprise, with its hot sauces becoming the company's most popular product line.

== Production ==
By the end of 1978, Nali chilies were in great demand. Nali Limited is the largest company in Malawi involved in the processing and selling of sauces and condiments for both local and export markets. They currently produce Nali Sauces and other agricultural products. Currently, Nali has about 3,000 farmers that help to grow the chillis.

== Varieties ==
There are currently 8 different flavors of Nali Sauces: Hot, Gold, Garlic, Ginger, Curry Masala, Chicken BBQ, Steak BBQ and Kambuzi.

== Packaging ==
The label on the bottle comes with a warning in English and Chichewa that reads, "Abale Samalani", which means Friends, take care.

== Management ==
Since the passing of Mr. Khoromana in October 1997, Nali is now managed by Mrs. Orpa Barlucchi, daughter of the founder. The company remains owned by the Khoromana family, with Mrs. M. Khoromana (wife of the Late Mr. Khoromana) serving as the board chair.
