= Sakurab =

Edible vegetable

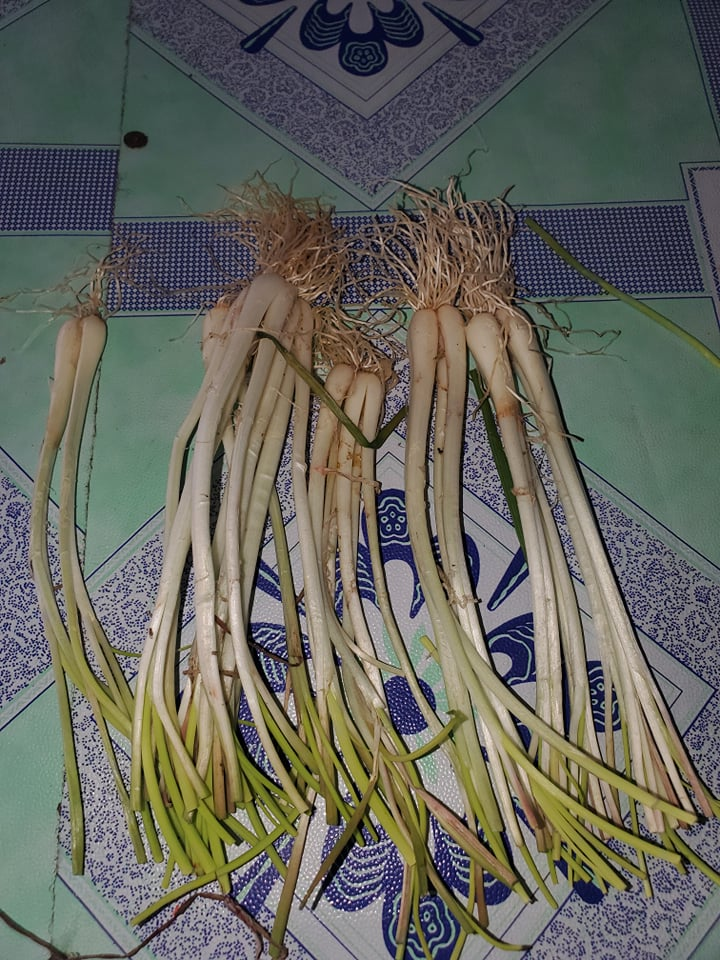
Sakurab with leaves cut

Sakurab ( Allium chinense G. Don) is either a relative of the scallion (Allium fistulosum L.) or a white variant of the wild leek (Allium ampeloprasum). There have been journals discussing its growth patterns and potential usage as an ingredient in a healthy beverage with evidence to support either view. It is a traditional food seasoning in the Philippines, used in the traditional cuisines in the islands of Mindanao and the Visayas where it is commonly known as sibujing.

== Description ==
Sakurab resembles a scallion having bulb at its base, a white stalk, and a fan of slender green leaves as well as an intense aroma and flavor reminiscent of shallots. It grows natively in the Lanao provinces of Mindanao in the Philippines, mostly commonly in cities and towns around Lake Lanao, and is sold by Maranao merchants in areas where it is desired but not commonly grown.

== Cuisine ==
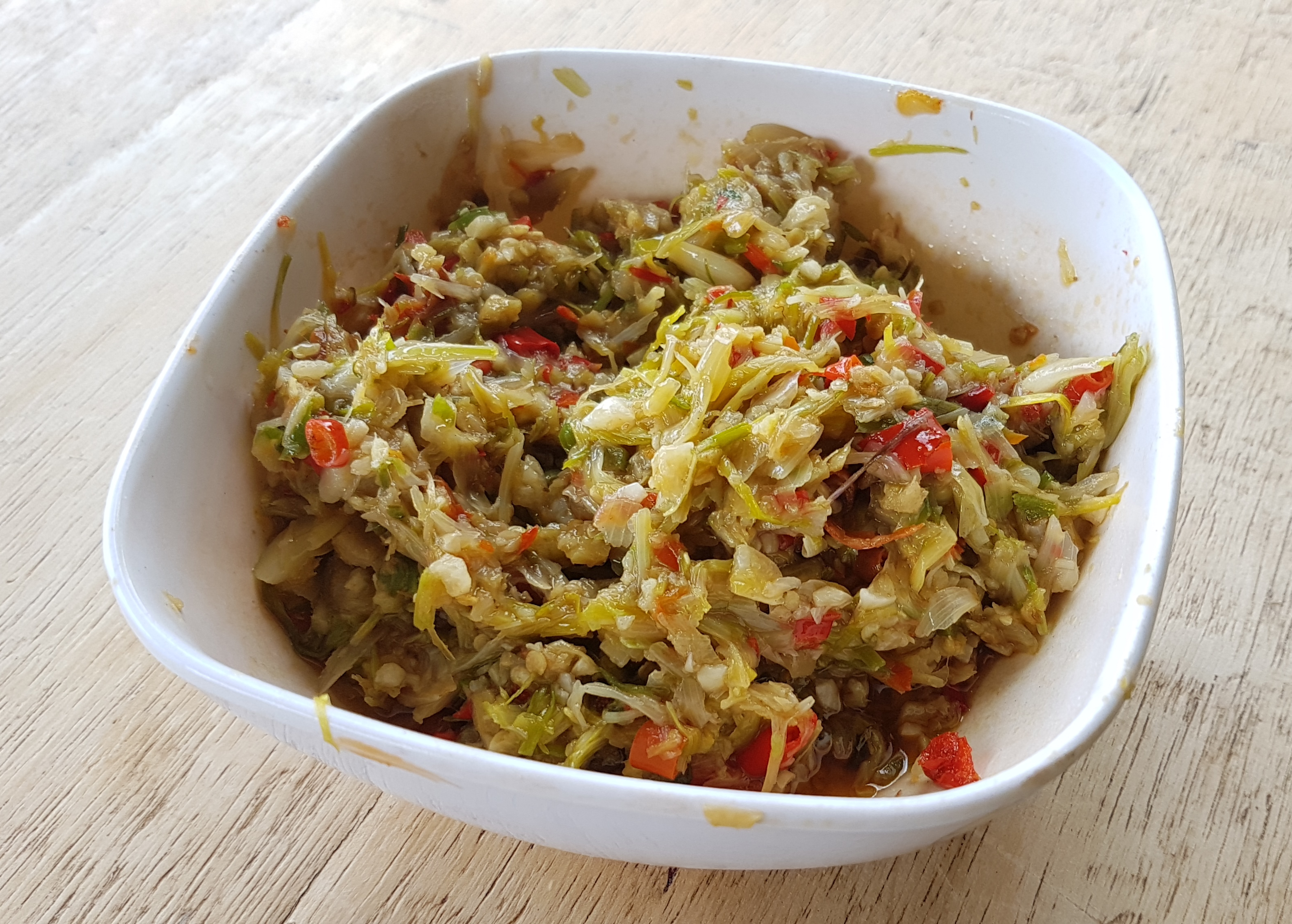
An example of wet palapa, prepared with coconut milk

The most common use for sakurab is in the ubiquitous Maranao condiment palapa, in which it is used in its entirety along with chili peppers, garlic, salt, ginger, and coconut flakes (if dry palapa) or coconut milk (if wet palapa). It can be eaten in its raw form as a side dish or added as an ingredient for another dish such as piaparan. The flavor of sakurab has been described as similar to scallions and shallots, but richer; half of one stem of sakurab is enough to cover the need for a full piece of a scallion.

Sakurab has been found to contain at least 3 times as much sugar compared to other species of Allium ampeloprasum, containing 18.33g of sugar per 210g following a Brix test while other species contained about 5.9g of sugar per 210g. This makes it much easier to utilize the nutritional benefits of the plant when mixing it with fruit juices to give it a more pleasant means of ingestion. In the highest concentrations tested (250g of sakurab mixed with juices), the apple juice formulation was most enjoyed for its taste and aroma, while the lemon juice formulation was most enjoyed for its color and texture.

== See also ==
- Palapa (condiment)
- Piaparan
