= Palapa (condiment) =

Sweet and spicy Filipino condiment

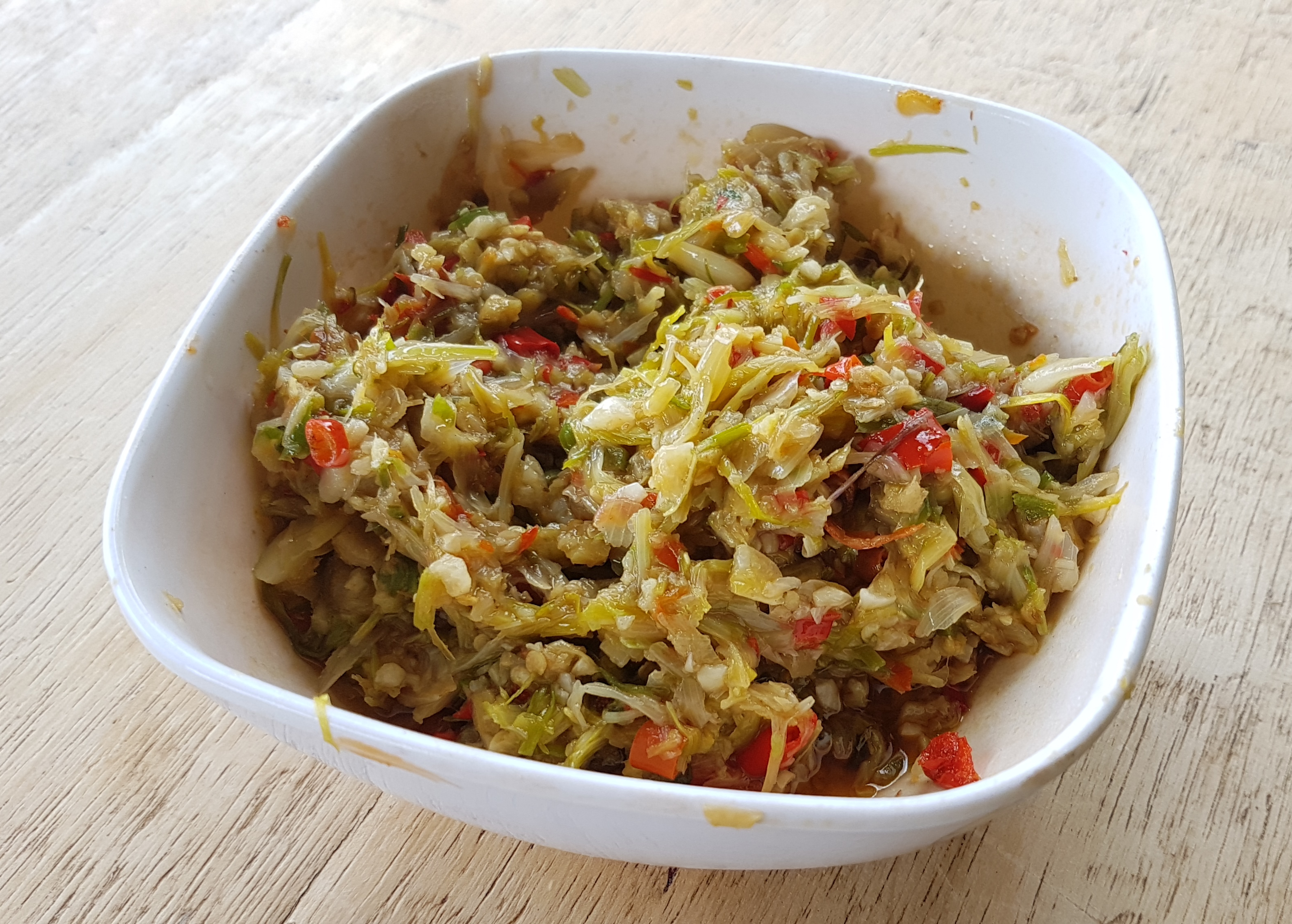
- Alternative names: Pelapa'
- Course: Condiment, ingredient
- Place of origin: Philippines
- Region or state: Lanao del Sur; Lanao del Norte; Zamboanga del Sur
- Created by: Maranao people

Palapa is a sweet and spicy Filipino condiment made from thinly chopped white scallions (sakurab), pounded ginger (luya pagirison), turmeric (kalawag), labuyo chili (luya tiduk), and toasted grated coconut (niog). It originates from the Maranao people of Lanao del Sur. The ingredients are mixed together and cooked briefly or cooked until slightly dry. It is stored immediately in sealed jars (garapon) after cooking. Palapa can be used as an ingredient in certain dishes, most notably in piaparan, or as a condiment after briefly sautéing, often with a spoonful of condensed milk. It can also be eaten fresh as salad dressing. Palapa is an important cultural symbol of the Maranao people and is a common accompaniment at every meal.

== See also ==
- Philippine condiments
- Bagoong
- List of condiments
- Sambal
- Taba ng talangka
