= Pepper jelly =

Preserve made with hot peppers

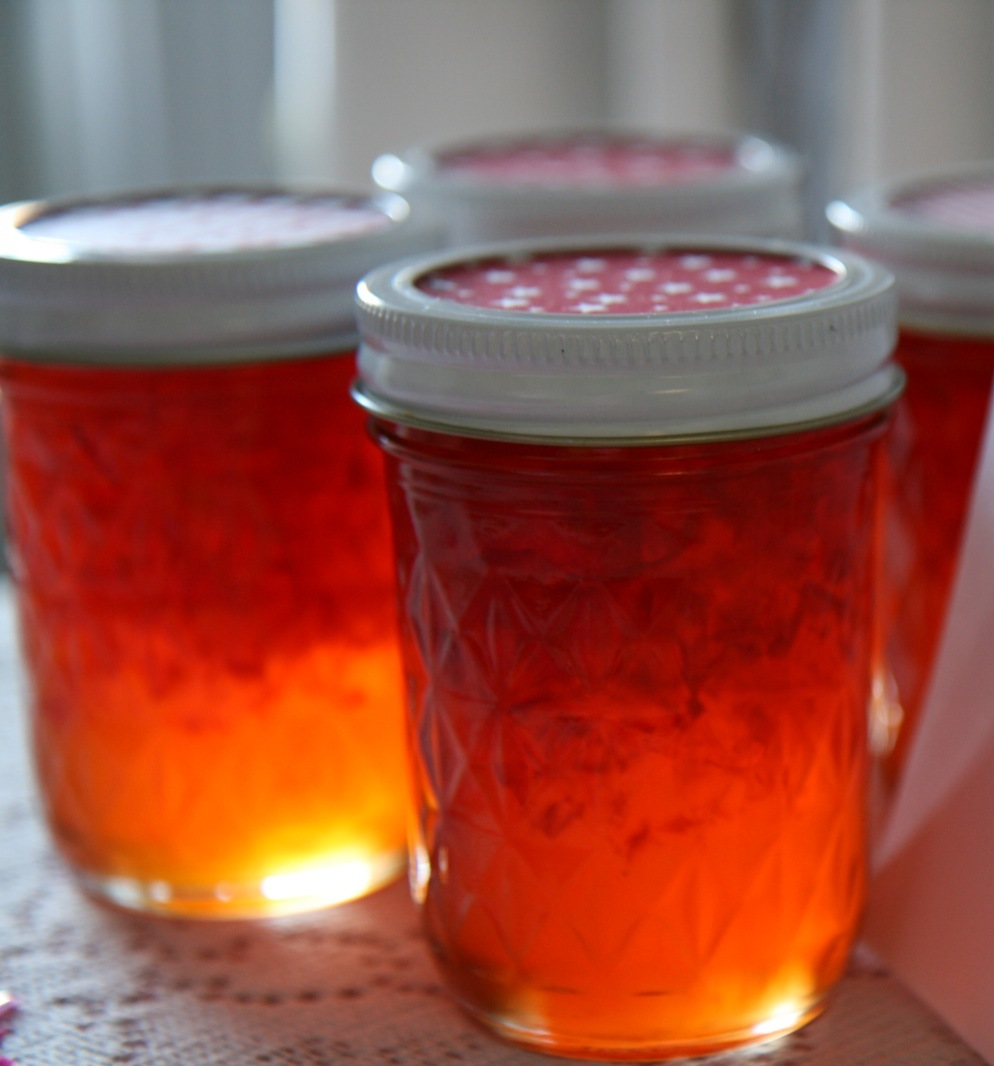
- Jars of red pepper jelly
- Course: Condiment
- Main ingredients: Chili peppers, sugar and salt, pectin or vinegar

Pepper jelly is a preserve made with peppers, sugar, and salt in a pectin or vinegar base. The product, which rose in popularity in the United States from the 1980s to mid-1990s, can be described as a piquant mix of sweetness and heat, and is used for meats and as an ingredient in various food preparations. It can be put in sandwiches, or served on cream cheese for a cracker spread or used to make a pepper jelly cheesecake.

== History ==
Pepper jelly's history starts in Lake Jackson, Texas. The first dates for commercial sale start around the late 1970s. The original recipes for pepper jelly were likely to be with jalapeño peppers.

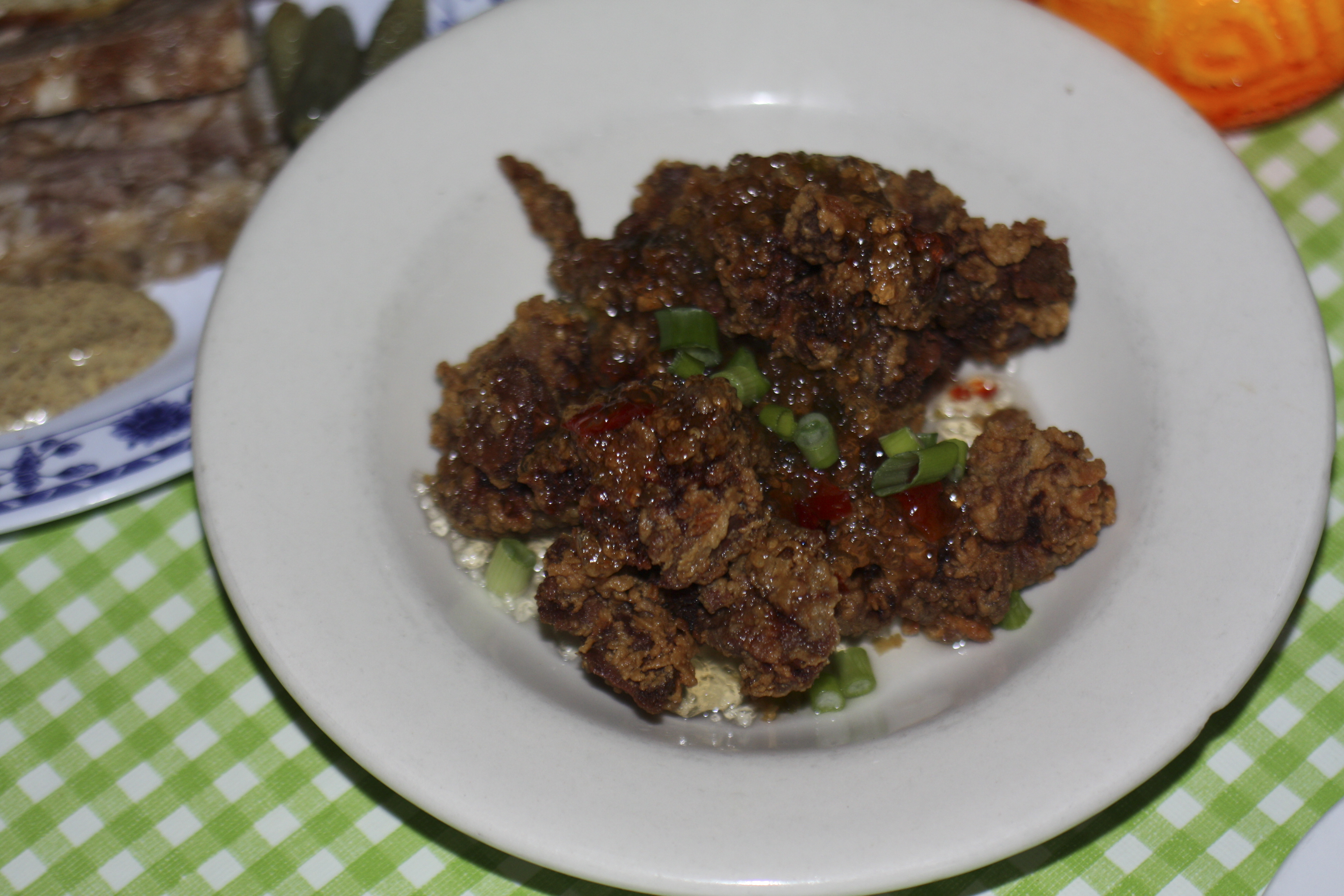
Fried chicken livers with pepper jelly from Elizabeth's Restaurant in Bywater, New Orleans

== Preparation ==
The more common preparation of pepper jelly is with jalapeños, bell peppers, pectin, sugar, vinegar, and oftentimes wine or liqueur.

There have been taste tests to observe which pepper combination is most popular and desirable. The peppers looked at were Habanero, Cheiro do Norte, Biquinho, Malagueta, Cayenne, Paprika and Dedo de Moça. The study concluded that less pungent peppers (Biquinho, Paprika and Cheiro do Norte) were the most suitable for making jelly due to the reddish color, characteristic flavor and aroma of a pepper, sweet taste, and low pungency.

== See also ==
- List of spreads
