= Nam phrik =

Thai chili sauce

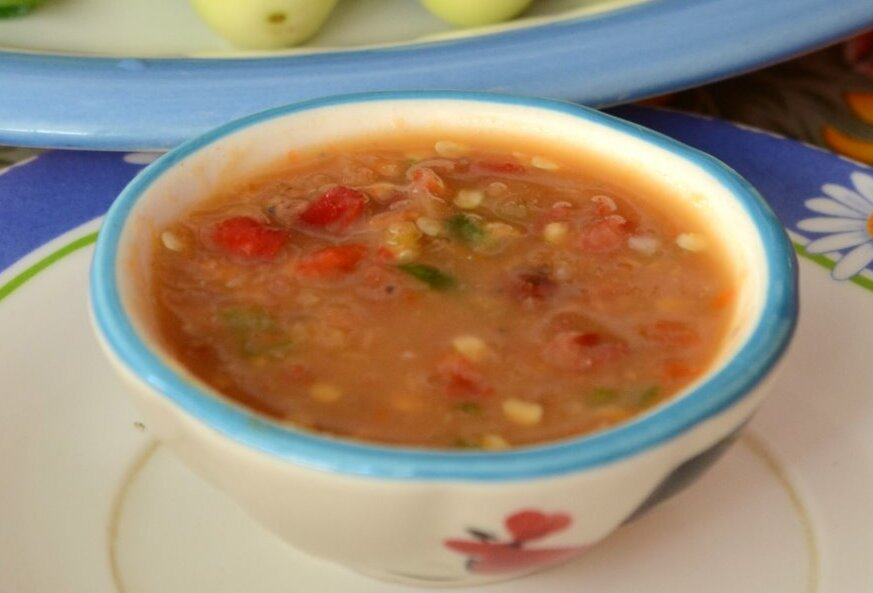
- Nam phrik kapi
- Alternative names: น้ำพริก
- Type: Dip or chili sauce
- Place of origin: Thailand
- Region or state: Southeast Asia
- Created by: Thai people
- Main ingredients: Chili peppers
- Similar dishes: Ngapi yay, lalab, ulam (salad)

Nam phrik (Thai: น้ำพริก, pronounced [ná(ː)m pʰrík̚]) is a type of Thai spicy chili sauce typical of Thai cuisine. Usual ingredients for nam phrik-type sauces are fresh or dry chilies, garlic, shallots, lime juice and often some kind of fish or shrimp paste. In the traditional way of preparing these sauces, the ingredients are pounded together using a mortar and pestle, with either salt or fish sauce added to taste.

Nam phrik-type sauces are normally served on small saucers placed by the main dish as a condiment or dip for relatively bland preparations, such as raw or boiled greens, fish, poultry and meats. Depending on the type, the region and the family that prepares it, nam phrik may vary in texture from a liquid to a paste to an almost dry, granular, or powdery consistency.

Instead of khrueang kaeng or phrik kaeng, the words nam phrik can also be used to denote Thai curry pastes, such as in nam phrik kaeng som for kaeng som or nam phrik kaeng phet for kaeng phet.

== History ==
The first Westerner to report of nam phrik was Simon de la Loubère, a French ambassador to the court of Ayutthaya. In 1687–88 he noted that it contains "a mustard like sauce, which consisted of crayfish corrupted (fermented fish); which they called kapi." Another Westerner historical account of nam phrik comes from Jean-Baptiste Pallegoix, a French missionary who lived in Thailand in 1838. He wrote that "the majority of Thai people lives on rice, dried fish, bananas, soft shoots of trees, cress and other aquatic plants which they soak in a spicy sauce called nam phrik." King Chulalongkorn, regarded as one of the greatest kings of Thailand, repeatedly stated during his tour of Europe in 1907 that, besides khai chiao (omelette), he most missed nam phrik. The chef David Thompson, an acknowledged expert on Thai cuisine, writes, "They are at the very core of Thai cooking and have fed the Thai from their distant past to the present."

Chili peppers originated in the Americas, where they have been cultivated for over 6,000 years. They were probably introduced to Asia, and Thailand, in the 16th century by Portuguese emissaries and traders in what is known as the Columbian Exchange. Before chili peppers were known and enthusiastically embraced in Thai cuisine, other spices such as black pepper, long pepper, and Sichuan pepper were used instead to achieve the desired "spiciness".

== Selected types ==
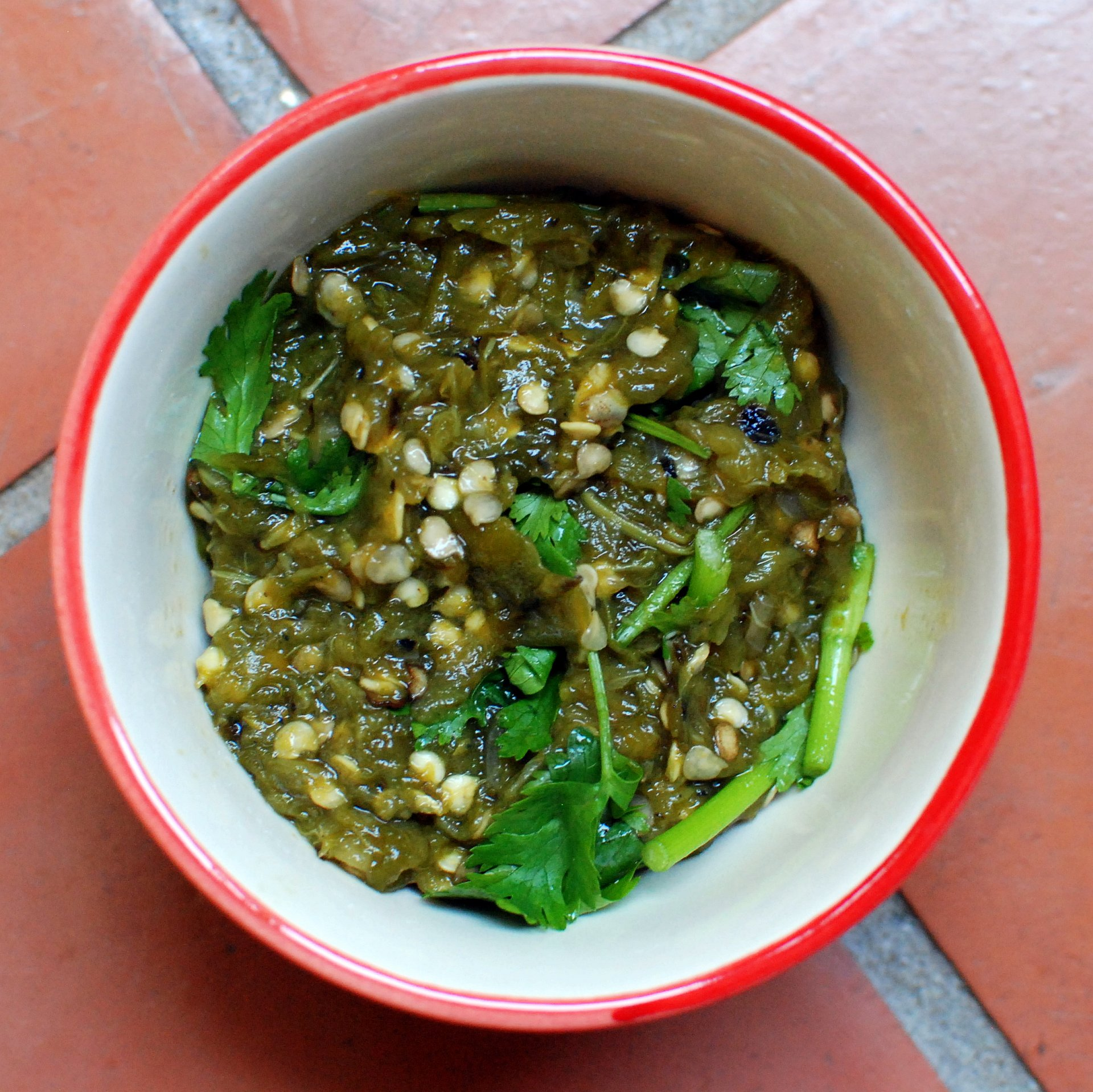
Nam phrik num, a northern Thai specialty

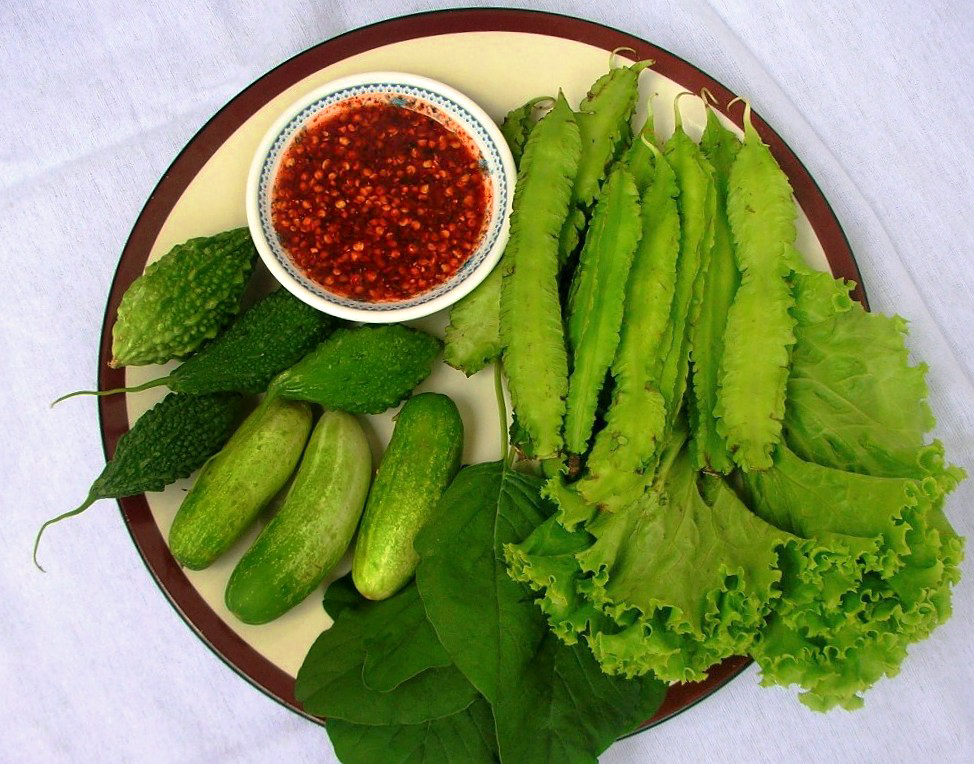
Ready-to-eat nam phrik pla salat pon from Khorat

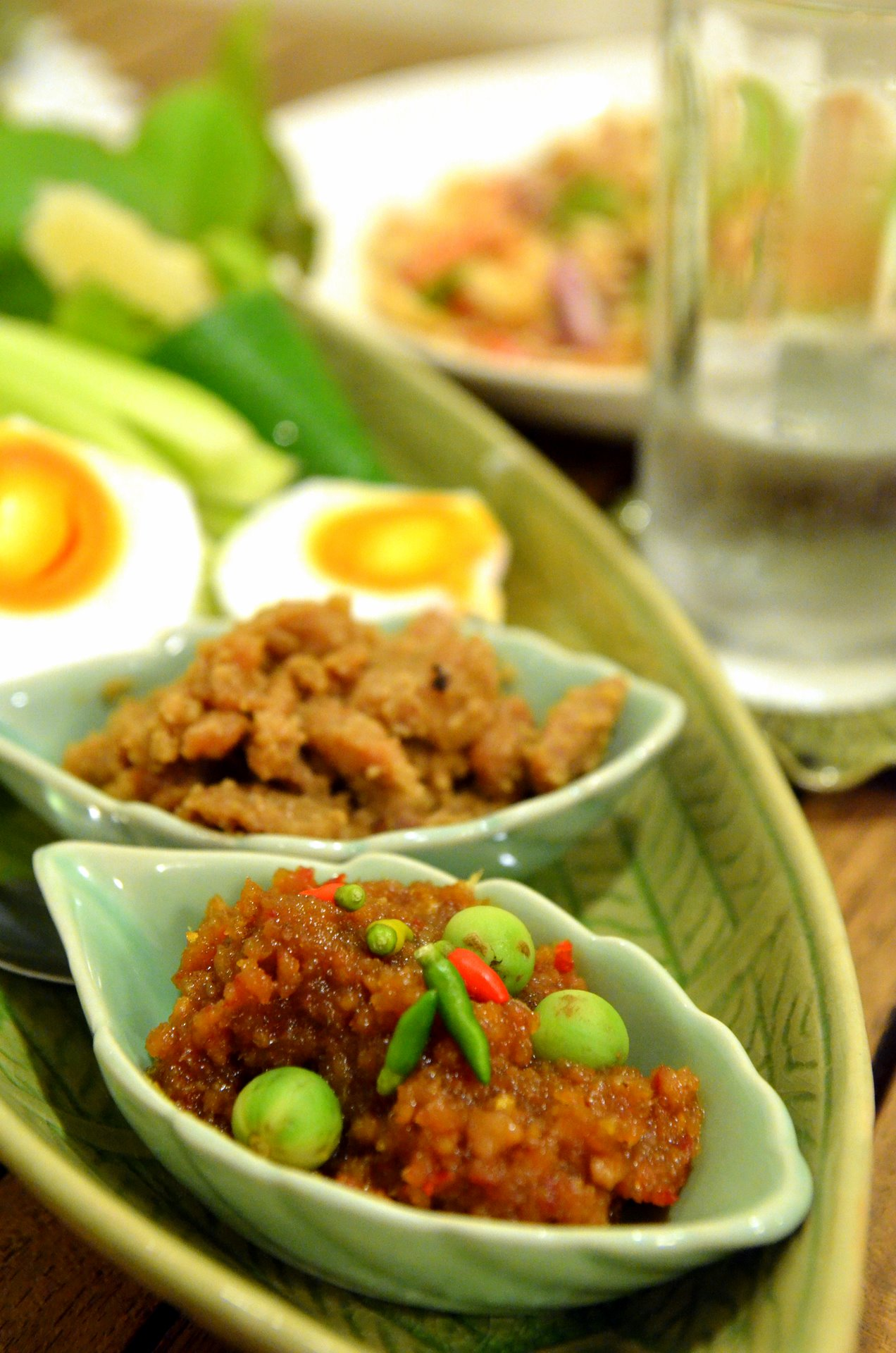
Nam phrik long ruea

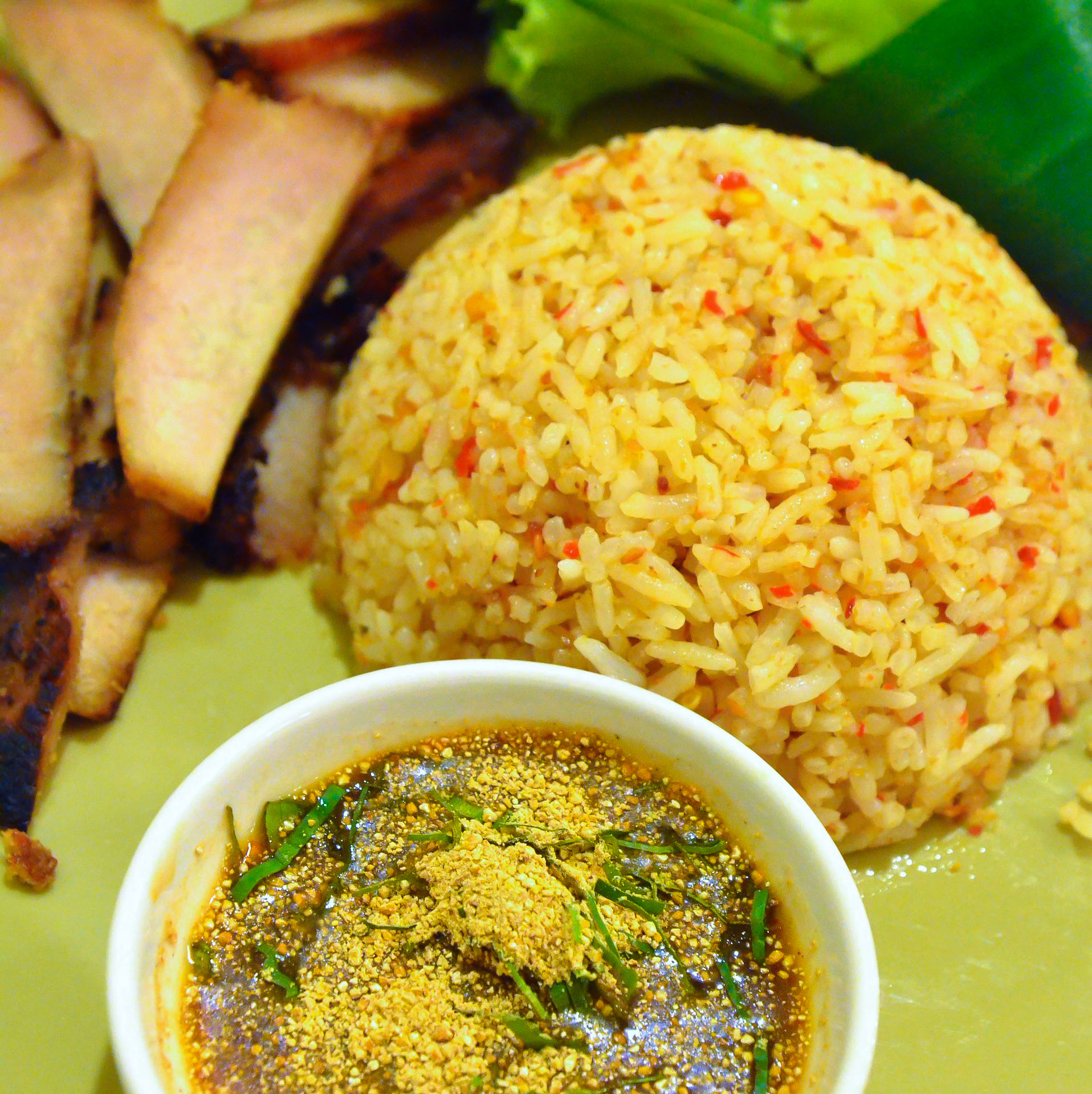
Khao phat nam phrik narok is rice fried with nam phrik narok; here served with grilled pork and a nam chim (dipping sauce)

Types of nam phrik vary according to the ingredients, the preparation and the region. Some may include tamarind, green mango, galangal, lemongrass or mushrooms and even ingredients such as frog. If fish paste is used, it may be made in a variety of ways, by mincing dried, boiled, grilled or salted fish, or by using fish roe. In Isan, pla ra, giving an intense flavor, is often used. Some types of nam phrik may be sweetened with sugar. A Thai cook book from 1974 lists over 100 different recipes. Among the most widespread varieties, the following deserve mention:

- Nam phrik kapi (น้ำพริกกะปิ) is one of the most widespread varieties and is typical of central Thailand. It contains fermented shrimp paste, lime, chilies, and often pea eggplant. It is often eaten with fried pla thu and vegetables, among other dishes.
- Nam phrik kha (น้ำพริกข่า) is made with roasted chilies, garlic, galangal and salt. This northern Thai specialty is often served as a dip for steamed mushrooms.
- Nam phrik kung siap (น้ำพริกกุ้งเสียบ) is a Southern Thai specialty popular in the provinces of Phuket and Krabi. It is made from crispy smoked dried shrimp (kung siap), shallots, garlic, bird's eye chili, shrimp paste and seasoned with lime juice, palm sugar, and fish sauce.
- Nam phrik long ruea (น้ำพริกลงเรือ; lit. "In the boat chili paste") is an elaborate fried nam phrik using several kinds of fruits such as Garcinia schomburgkiana and Solanum ferox, dried shrimp, sweet pork, and shrimp paste in addition to chilies, garlic and sugar. It is eaten with salted duck egg, fresh greens, and, for instance, sliced zedoary ("white turmeric").
- Nam phrik maeng da (น้ำพริกแมงดา) incorporates roasted and pounded maeng da (Lethocerus indicus, a kind of giant water bug) for its specific taste.
- Nam phrik narok (น้ำพริกนรก) literally translates to "chili paste from hell". It is made with dried chilies, shrimp paste, catfish, shallots, garlic, fish sauce and sugar.
- Nam phrik num (น้ำพริกหนุ่ม), a thick northern specialty based on roasted green chilies, onion and garlic, is usually eaten along with vegetables, pork cracklings, and sticky rice.
- Nam phrik ong (น้ำพริกอ่อง) is a traditional specialty of northern Thailand made with minced pork and tomato.
- Nam phrik phao (น้ำพริกเผา) is sweetened with sugar and, among other ingredients, roasted chilies and tamarind. It is popular as a spread on bread or toast. It can also be used as an ingredient, for instance in tom yum or in the Thai salad with squid called phla pla muek.
- Nam phrik pla ching chang (น้ำพริกปลาฉิ้งฉ้าง) is based on small, local anchovies (Stolephorus) popular in Phuket.
- Nam phrik pla ra (น้ำพริกปลาร้า) is made with pla ra as one of the main ingredients. Like most types of nam phrik, a little water is used if the mixture becomes too thick.
- Nam phrik pla salat pon (น้ำพริกปลาสลาดป่น), also known as phrik pla salat pon, is a variety of nam phrik with powdered, roasted, dry pla salat (Notopterus notopterus). All main ingredients (the dry fish, red dry chili and garlic) are previously roasted until crunchy. Shrimp paste and sugar are also added, and the mixture is pounded with a mortar and pestle. It is eaten with raw vegetables, and is popular in Khorat.
- Nam phrik pla yang (น้ำพริกปลาย่าง) is mainly minced, grilled fish, usually pla chon, mixed with onion, garlic, powdered chili, tamarind, shrimp paste, fish sauce and sugar.
- Nam phrik tai pla (น้ำพริกไตปลา), one of its main ingredients is tai pla, a sauce used in the southern Thai cuisine made with the fermented innards of the short-bodied mackerel.

== See also ==
- Chili pepper paste
- Nam chim (another type of Thai dipping sauce)
- Sriracha sauce
- List of Thai dishes
- List of Thai ingredients
- Sambal, the equivalent of nam phrik in Indonesian, Malaysian and Sri Lankan cuisine
- List of condiments
- List of dips
- List of sauces
