= Piaparan =

Filipino dish

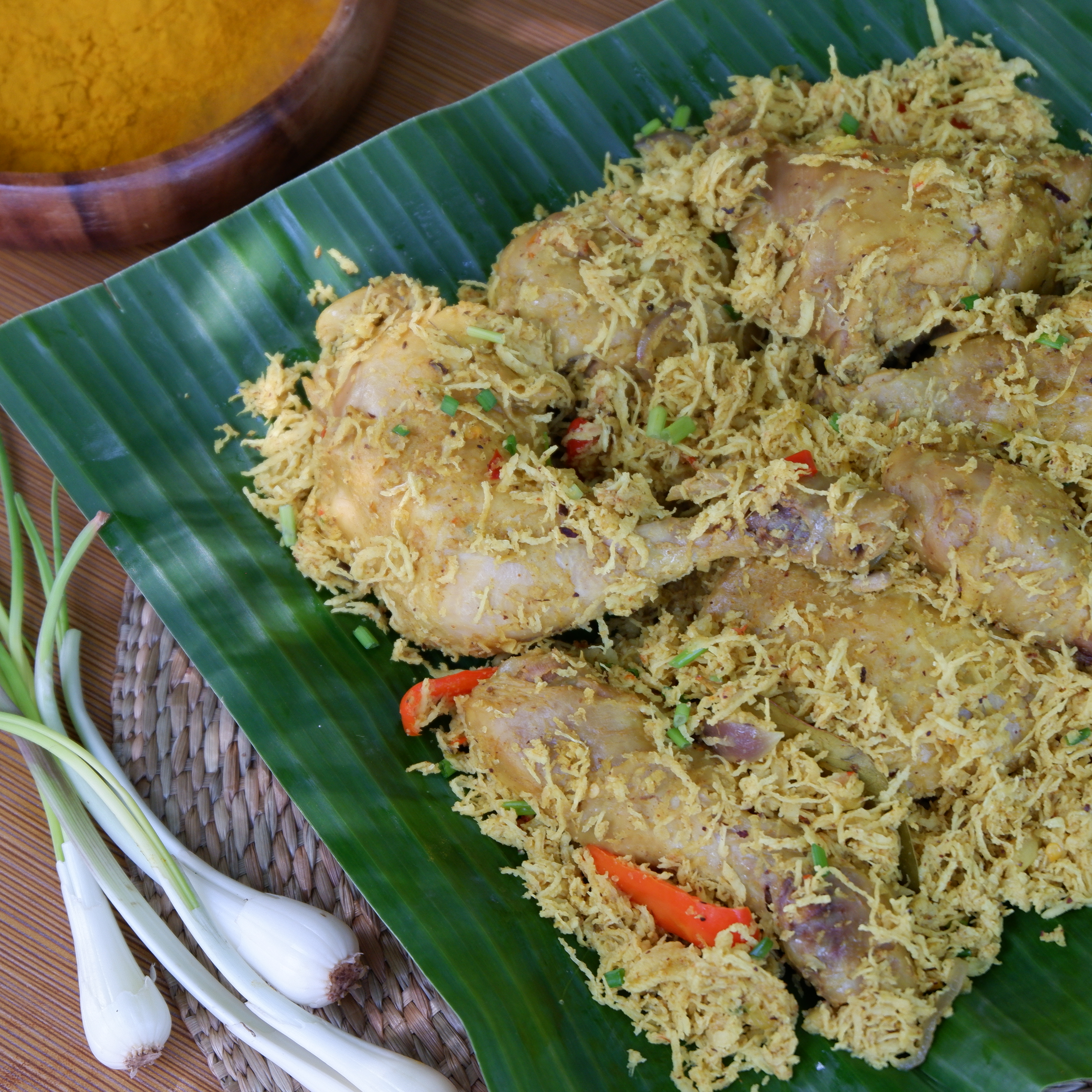
- Alternative names: Pipaparan, Piarun, Pyarun, Piaran, Pyaran
- Course: Main dish
- Place of origin: Philippines
- Region or state: Lanao del Sur; Lanao del Norte, and diaspora communities
- Created by: Maranao people
- Serving temperature: hot
- Main ingredients: chicken (or other types of meat or seafood), turmeric, onions, garlic, shredded coconut, palapa, coconut milk
- Similar dishes: pyanggang manok, adobo sa gata

Piaparan, also known as pipaparan, piaran, or piarun, is a Filipino dish consisting of meat (usually chicken) or seafood cooked in a coconut milk-based broth with grated coconut, garlic, onions, ginger, turmeric, young wild shallots (sakurab), labuyo chili, and various vegetables and spiced with palapa. It originates from the Maranao people of Lanao del Sur. Piaparan means "shredded coconut" in Maranao and is a type of ginataan.

== See also ==
- List of chicken dishes
- Tinola
- Tiyula itum
