= List of Thai dishes =

Below is a list of dishes found in Thai cuisine.

== Individual dishes ==
Note: The Thai script column is linked to how it is pronounced when available.

=== Rice dishes ===
Thai name	Thai script	English name	Image	Region	Description
Chok	โจ๊ก	Rice congee			Of Chinese origin, it is a rice congee with minced chicken or pork. Mixing an egg in with the congee is optional.
Khao kan chin	ข้าวกั๊นจิ๊น			North	A dish of the Tai Yai (Shan people) of Myanmar and northern Thailand, it is rice that is mixed with pork blood and steamed inside a banana leaf. Khao kan chin is served with cucumber, onions and fried, dried chili peppers.
Khao kha mu	ข้าวขาหมู	Braised pork leg on rice			Steamed rice is served with sliced pig's trotters, which has been simmered in soy sauce and five spice powder. It is always served with a sweet spicy dipping sauce, fresh bird's eye chili peppers and cloves of garlic on the side. Boiled egg and a clear broth on the side are optional.
Khao khai chiao	ข้าวไข่เจียว	Omelette on rice			A quick snack or breakfast, it is an omelette with white rice, often eaten with chili sauce and cucumber. The variant shown in the image is khao khai chiao songkhrueang (Thai: ข้าวไข่เจียวทรงเครื่อง) where the omelette is topped with a minced pork and vegetable stir-fry.
Khao khluk kapi	ข้าวคลุกกะปิ	Fried rice with shrimp paste			Rice is fried with shrimp paste and served with sweet pork, sour mango, fried shrimp, chili peppers, and shallots.
Khao mok gai	ข้าวหมกไก่	Thai chicken biryani			The Thai version of a "chicken biryani". The name literally means "rice covered chicken" and this Thai-Muslim dish is made by cooking rice together with the chicken curry.
Khao mok nuea	ข้าวหมกเนื้อ	Thai beef biryani			The Thai version of a "beef biryani".
Khao man gai	ข้าวมันไก่	Chicken rice			Rice steamed with garlic served with sliced chicken, chicken broth, and a spicy dipping sauce. This is a Thai version of a dish called Wenchang chicken (文昌雞) from Hainan in southern China.
Khao mu krop	ข้าวหมูกรอบ	Crispy pork on rice			Rice and crispy pork that is often, as here in this image, served with boiled egg and a bowl of broth. The sauce that always comes with khao mu krop is here served separately in the bowl at the top of the image.
Khao mu krop mu daeng	ข้าวหมูกรอบหมูแดง	Mixed crispy pork and red roast pork on rice			Slices of mu krop (crispy pork) and mu daeng (red roast pork) served on rice, and often covered with a sticky soy or oyster-sauce based sauce. Very often, a clear soup, boiled egg, cucumber, and spring onion is served on the side. Sliced chili peppers in Chinese black vinegar and dark soy sauce are provided as a condiment for this dish.
Khao na pet	ข้าวหน้าเป็ด	Red roast duck on rice			Boiled rice with roast duck and duck broth on the side. It is served with sliced chili peppers in soy sauce as a condiment.
Khao niao	ข้าวเหนียว	Glutinous or sticky rice			Khao niao is traditionally eaten using only the right hand. It is the staple food of Northern and Northeastern Thais.
Khao nuea op	ข้าวเนื้ออบ				Rice with slices of baked beef, served with a spicy chili dip.
Khao phat	ข้าวผัด	Thai fried rice			Fried rice in Thailand can be made with different ingredients. Customarily served with fresh lime, cucumber, spring onions, and nam pla phrik (chili peppers in fish sauce).
Khao phat amerikan	ข้าวผัดอเมริกัน	American fried rice			American fried rice is rice fried with onion, tomato, raisins, and flavored with ketchup. It is often garnished with some sausage, fried chicken, and egg.
Khao phat kaeng khiao wan	ข้าวผัดแกงเขียวหวาน				Rice fried with green curry.
Khao phat kaphrao mu	ข้าวผัดกะเพราหมู	Basil fried rice with pork			Rice fried with a certain variety of Thai basil called kaphrao (Ocimum tenuiflorum), sliced pork, and chili peppers.
Khao phat namliap	ข้าวผัดหนำเลี้ยบ				Rice fried with nam liap, the fruit of the Canarium album, also known as "Chinese olives".
Khao phat nam phrik long ruea	ข้าวผัดน้ำพริกลงเรือ			Central	Rice fried with Nam phrik long ruea (lit. "boat journey chili paste") and pieces of khai khem (salted duck's eggs). Fried, sliced, sweet Chinese sausage called kun chiang (Thai: กุนเชียง) are also served here with some sliced cucumber on the side.
Khao phat nam phrik narok	ข้าวผัดน้ำพริกนรก				The name literally means "rice fried with chili paste from hell". The rice is fried with nam phrik narok, a very spicy chili paste made with fried catfish, grilled onion and garlic, grilled (dried) chili peppers, sugar, fish sauce, and shrimp paste. Here it is served with mu yang (grilled pork) and nam chim chaeo, a spicy dipping sauce.
Khao tom	ข้าวต้ม	Thai rice soup			Boiled rice in a light broth, usually with minced pork, chicken, or fish. It is often eaten for breakfast.
Khao tom kui	ข้าวต้มกุ๊ย	Plain rice congee			Plain rice is cooked to a porridge and eaten as the staple together with a variety of side dishes.

=== Noodle dishes ===
Thai name	Thai script	English name	Image	Region	Description
Bami haeng pet	บะหมี่แห้งเป็ด	Egg noodles served "dry" with duck			Egg noodles served "dry" with slices of braised duck, and often, as shown on the image, together with "blood tofu". The broth is served on the side. It is originally a Chinese dish.
Bami mu daeng	บะหมี่หมูแดง	Egg noodle soup with red roast pork			Originally a Chinese dish, it is now common in Thailand. Often served with chili peppers in vinegar, and dried chili flakes. The version shown in the photo also contains kiao kung (Thai: เกี๊ยวกุ้ง; prawn wontons).
Khanom chin kaeng khiao wan kai	ขนมจีนแกงเขียวหวานไก่				This noodle dish consists of green chicken curry served over khanom chin, fresh Thai rice noodles. It is usually accompanied by a selection of raw vegetables and herbs on the side. The chicken meat used in this particular version is chicken feet.
Khanom chin nam ngiao	ขนมจีนน้ำเงี้ยว			North	A speciality of Northern Thailand, it is Thai fermented rice noodles served with pork or chicken blood tofu in a sauce made with pork broth and tomato, crushed fried dry chili peppers, pork blood, dry fermented soy bean, and dried red kapok flowers.
Khanom jeen nam yaa	ขนมจีนน้ำยา			Central	Thai rice noodles served with a fish based sauce called nam ya.
Khanom chin sao nam	ขนมจีนซาวน้ำ			Central	Cold rice noodles served as a salad with thick coconut milk, finely chopped pineapple, sliced raw garlic and Thai chili peppers, pounded dried prawns, shredded ginger, lime juice, fish sauce, and sugar.
Khao soi Chang Mai	ข้าวซอย	Northern Thai curry noodles		North	Boiled as well as crispy fried egg noodles (bami) are served in a curry soup. The version with chicken is called khao soi kai, with beef it is called khao soi nuea.
Khao soi Mae Sai	ข้าวซอยแม่สาย			North	Khao soi Mae Sai is the name in Chiang Mai of a certain type of khao soi that is more common in Chiang Rai province, in the area along the border with Burma and Laos (Mae Sai is a border town in Chiang Rai province). It is a spicy soup-like dish, similar to the broth used in khanom chin nam ngiao, containing soft, wide rice noodles, pork ribs, congealed pork blood, and minced pork. Tomatoes and fermented soy bean give it its specific taste. Sliced raw cabbage and bean sprouts are served on the side.
Khao soi nam na	ข้าวซอยน้ำหน้า			North	Somewhat similar to khao soi Mae Sai, this variant from the eastern part of Chiang Rai Province is made with wide rice noodles in a clear pork broth. A spoonful of nam phrik ong (a sauce made from minced pork, tomato, fermented soy bean or shrimp paste, and dried chili peppers) is heaped on top of the noodles (nam na literally means "with sauce on top").
Kuaichap	กวยจั๊บ				Originally a Teochew Chinese dish (Chinese: 粿汁), it is a soup of pork broth with rolled up rice noodle sheets (resulting in rolls about the size of Italian penne), pork intestines, "blood tofu", and boiled egg.
Kuai-tiao nam	ก๋วยเตี๋ยวน้ำ	Wide rice noodle soup			A soup of wide rice noodles, often with minced pork, pork balls or fish balls.
Kuai-tiao nuea pueai	ก๋วยเตี๋ยวเนื้อเปื่อย				A beef noodle soup with slices of very tender beef (nuea pueay).
Kuai-tiao phat khi mao	ก๋วยเตี๋ยวผัดขี้เมา	Drunken noodles			Spicy fried wide rice noodles.
Kuai-tiao rat na	ก๋วยเตี๋ยวราดหน้า	Wide rice noodles in gravy		Central	Fried wide rice noodles with beef, pork, chicken, or seafood in a thickened gravy.
Kuai-tiao ruea	ก๋วยเตี๋ยวเรือ	Boat noodles		Central	Rice noodles with beef or pork (and sometimes offal) in a brown broth which contains cinnamon, star anise and sometimes blood. It is spicy and sour.
Mi krop	หมี่กรอบ	Thai crispy fried noodles			Deep fried rice vermicelli with a sweet and sour sauce.
Phat mi Khorat	ผัดหมี่โคราช			Nakhon Ratchasima Province	A stir-fried rice noodle dish commonly served with papaya salad (som tam). Dried rice noodle (of many colors) is a specific ingredient; made with dried rice noodle, garlic, shallot, pork, salt soya, beans, fish sauce, palm sugar, red pepper, black soy sauce, water, spring onion and bean sprouts. Traditionally used to exploit preserved old rice; used in religious ceremonies.
Phat Mama	ผัดมาม่า				Mama (Thai: มาม่า) is the most popular brand of instant noodles in Thailand and the brand name is commonly used, instead of the generic bami kueng samret rup (Thai: บะหมี่กึ่งสำเร็จรูป), to designate instant noodles. The particular version in the image has been stir-fried "drunken noodle"-style.
Phat si-io	ผัดซีอิ๊ว	Noodles stir-fried with soy sauce			Usually wide rice noodles fried with chicken or pork, and soy sauce.
Phat Thai	ผัดไทย	Pad Thai noodles			Stir fried medium size rice noodles (sen lek) with fish sauce, sugar, lime juice or tamarind pulp, ground peanuts, egg, bean sprouts, and Chinese chives (kuichai), combined with shrimp.
Phat wun sen	ผัดวุ้นเส้น	Stir-fried glass noodles			Glass noodles are stir-fried with egg and vegetables, and a variety of ingredients such as meat, seafood, or with vegetarian alternatives.
Sapaketti phat khi mao	สปาเกตตีผัดขี้เมา				A Thai fusion dish where the name literally means spaghetti fried "shit-drunk" (khi mao = extremely drunk). An explanation is that any dish fried this way is easy to make, spicy, and uses whatever ingredients are available at that time; great after a night out drinking when still hungry.
Tom yam boran	ต้มยำโบราณ			Central	Tom yam boran is noodles served in a thick spicy sour sauce or broth, with crushed dried chili peppers, chopped peanuts, and blanched vegetables such as bean sprouts. This version is bami mu tom yam boran: with egg noodles and pork.
Yentafo	เย็นตาโฟ				The Thai version of the Chinese noodle dish Yong Tau Foo is slightly sweet, sour, salty, and spicy.
Yum kanom jeen	ยำขนมจีน				Yum kanomjeen is a spicy and sour salad mixed with kanom jeen. Kanom jeen is thin rice noodles which are made from fresh rice sometimes fermented rice starch, fermented for few days, boiled and then made into noodles. The original kanom jeen came from the Mon people. The main ingredients of Yum kanom jeen are fish sauce, sugar, lime juice, and chili powder. Some places will add pla ra to Yum kanom jeen too. Pla ra is the Thai traditional ingredient produced by fermented fish. Yum kanom jeen has a good spicy and sour taste, but many people would like to order the flavor that they like. Yum kanom jeen is a low- calorie food and it has only 220 calories per dish. To suit for people who are healthy and want to diet. Yum kanom jeen is not difficult to find. It can be found in either restaurant or street food.

=== Miscellaneous ===
Thai name	Thai script	English name	Image	Region	Description
Chim chum	จิ้มจุ่ม				A Thai style hot pot served in an earthenware pot where the ingredients (meats, vegetables, mushrooms, noodles) are cooked in a clear herb broth of lemongrass, galangal, and kaffir lime leaves. Additionally, the broth can contain other herbs such as kaphrao (Thai holy basil), spices such as chillies, or in addition be partially meat based, using pork ribs for instance as one of the base ingredients. It is served with one or more nam chim (dipping sauces).
Kaolao	เกาเหลา				A soup of Chinese origin, usually containing offal, often pork liver and intestines, also boiled eggs, and other meats such as crispy pork. Alternatively, at regular noodle soup shops, it can also be as a regular Thai-Chinese noodle soup but then served without any noodles.
Khao soi noi songkhrueang	ข้าวซอยน้อยทรงเครื่อง				Colloquially also known as pizza doi (Thai: พิซซาดอย, literally: "mountain pizza"). This is a dish of Shan people. This version uses steamed egg and vegetables as the filling for the steamed rice wrap. The whole is dusted with crushed peanuts.
Mu kratha	หมูกระทะ				Mu kratha resembles a combination of a Korean barbecue and a Chinese hot pot. Meat (most often pork) is grilled in the center while the vegetables and other ingredients, such as fish balls, cook in the soup. It is served with a variety of nam chim (Thai dipping sauces).
Nam phrik kapi kap pla thu thot	น้ำพริกกะปิกับปลาทูทอด				Fried pla thu served with nam phrik kapi, a pungent dip made mainly from shrimp paste and chili peppers, and raw, steamed or fried vegetables (often pieces of cha-om omelette). It is eaten with khanom chin (Thai rice noodles) or steamed rice. Although the name of this dish is often shortened to nam phrik pla thu, this refers to a certain type of chili paste in which pla thu is used as an ingredient.
Pathongko	ปาท่องโก๋				The Thai version of the Chinese crullers called youtiao, they tend to be smaller than the Chinese original. Most often eaten with sweetened condensed milk or with Thai coconut jam, they can also be served with chok, Thai rice congee.
Suki	สุกี้	Thai suki			A Thai variant of the Chinese hot pot, it is mainly eaten as a meal on its own.

== Shared dishes ==
=== Curries ===
Thai name	Thai script	English name	Image	Region	Description
Chin hum	จิ๊นฮุ่ม			North	It is a slowly stewed meat curry from northern Thailand. This particular version is made with beef.
Chuchi pla kaphong	ฉู่ฉี่ปลากะพง			Central	A semi-dry red curry with fried Snapper.
Chuchi pla thu sot	ฉู่ฉี่ปลาทูสด			South	A semi-dry curry made with fresh (i.e. unsteamed and unsalted) pla thu (Rastrelliger brachysoma). The version in the image was made at a southern Thai restaurant.
Kaeng cha-om	แกงชะอม			North	A northern Thai curry with cha-om (the young leaves of the Acacia pennata) and dried fish. This particular version also contained a mix of different types of mushroom.
Kaeng fak sai kai	แกงฟักใส่ไก่			North	A northern Thai curry made with winter melon and chicken. It is also known under the name kaeng fak khio.
Kaeng dok salae	แกงดอกสะแล			North	A northern Thai curry that is made from the unopened flower buds of the shrub Broussonetia kurzii (J. D. Hooker) Corner. These flower buds are available in northern Thailand only from mid-February until late March.
Kaeng hangle	แกงฮังเล			North	A Burmese influenced curry of stewed meat (usually pork), peanuts, dried chili peppers and tamarind juice but without coconut milk. Thin strips of fresh ginger are added in before serving.
Kaeng het	แกงเห็ด			North	A northern Thai curry made with pork and a variety of mushrooms.
Kaeng ho	แกงโฮะ			North	A Northern Thai dish where one or more types of curry are refried with glass noodles and other ingredients such as kaffir lime leaves, lemongrass, and bamboo shoots. At least one of the curries used in this recipe should be the Northern Thai pork curry called kaeng hangle.
Kaeng kari	แกงกะหรี่	Yellow curry		South	It is a Thai-Muslim dish which is mostly known in the West as "Thai yellow curry". It is of Indian origin and is often made with chicken and potatoes. It can also be made with other meats or seafood.
Kaeng khae	แกงแค			North	A spicy curry of herbs, vegetables, cha-om leaves (a kind of acacia tree), and meat (chicken, water buffalo, pork, or frog meat). It does not contain any coconut milk.
Kaeng khanun	แกงขนุน			North	A northern Thai curry made with boiled whole jackfruit, pork, tomatoes, and chopped chakhan (Piper interruptum; "pepper vine").
Kaeng khiao wan	แกงเขียวหวาน	Green curry		Central	A coconut curry made with fresh green chili peppers and flavored with Thai basil, usually with chicken (kaeng khiao wan kai) or fish balls.
Kaeng khilek	แกงขี้เหล็ก				This creamy curry has as its main ingredient the leaves and flower buds of the Senna siamea tree (khilek in Thai).
Kaeng khua	แกงคั่ว			Central	A type of Thai curry which uses a larger amount of turmeric in the paste than is usually the norm. A popular preparation is with prawns and pineapple. This particular version is called kaeng khua het fang (Thai: แกงคั่วเห็ดฟาง): with straw mushrooms.
Kaeng khua mu bai chamuang	แกงคั่วหมูใบชะมวง			Central	A thick central Thai curry with pork and the leaves of chamuang or Garcinia cowa, a tree related to the mangosteen.
Kaeng kradang	แกงกระด้าง			North	A pork curry aspic (jelly) from northern Thailand which is eaten cold.
Kaeng lueang	แกงเหลือง			South	A sour spicy curry that does not contain coconut milk and is yellow in color due to the use of turmeric, often with fish and vegetables, such as bamboo shoots as in the version in the photo. In southern Thailand it is called kaeng som but due to it being different from the central Thai kaeng som, it is called kaeng lueang ("yellow curry") elsewhere. It should not be confused with what is known as "yellow curry" outside of Thailand.
Kaeng matsaman	แกงมัสมั่น	Massaman curry		South	A rich, thick curry containing coconut milk, usually of stewed beef or, as in the image, chicken. This curry contains roasted dried spices that are rarely found in other Thai curries. The name kaeng matsaman means "Muslim curry", with the spices believed to have been brought to Thailand by Muslim traders in the 17th century. Massaman curry is usually served with rice or roti.
Kaeng om	แกงอ่อม			North	A spicy Lanna "curry" with meat, and without any coconut milk. The version shown in the photo is with beef.
Kaeng pa	แกงป่า	Jungle curry		North	Traditionally made with wild boar, most often pork or chicken is used nowadays. This curry, as most curries from northern Thailand, does not contain coconut milk.
Kaeng phak bung sai pla	แกงผักบุ้งใส่ปลา			North	A northern Thai curry made with "morning glory" and catfish.
Kaeng phak kat cho kraduk mu	แกงผักกาดจอกระดูกหมู			North	A somewhat spicy soup/curry (kaeng) made with cabbage (phak kat cho, a variety of Brassica rapa chinensis) and pork ribs (kraduk mu). As is usual with Northern Thai "curries", it does not contain any coconut milk.
Kaeng phak lueat	แกงผักเลือด			North	A northern Thai curry made with the leaves of the Ficus virens. This version is with pork.
Kaeng phak siangda	แกงผักเซียงดา			North	A northern Thai curry made with the leaves of the vine Gymnema inodorum and dried fish. In this particular version, snakehead fish is used.
Kaeng phak wan pa	แกงผักหวานป่า			North	A Northern Thai curry made with the leaves of the woody plant Melientha suavis Pierre, glass noodles, and dried fish.
Kaeng phanaeng	แกงพะแนง	Phanaeng curry		Central	A so-called dry, Malay influenced coconut curry with beef (phanaeng nuea, Thai: พะแนงเนื้อ), chicken, pork or seafood such as soft shell crab.
Kaeng phet	แกงเผ็ด	Red curry		Central	A spicy red curry made with dried chili peppers, containing coconut milk. It can be made with different meats, seafood or tofu, in combination with (several types of) eggplant(s), and sometimes other vegetables. Fresh green peppercorns and Thai basil are often added to enhance the flavor.
Kaeng phet pet yang	แกงเผ็ดเป็ดย่าง	Red curry with roast duck		Central	Red curry with roast duck is the quintessential mix of the Thai (red curry) and Chinese (red roast duck) cuisines. This dish often also contains grapes and pineapple.
Kaeng pli	แกงปลี			North	A northern Thai curry made with chopped banana flower and pork.
Kaeng som	แกงส้ม	Sour and spicy fish curry		Central	A hot and sour Thai curry/soup made with tamarind paste and fish (often pla chon ["Snakehead fish"]). Kaeng som cha-om thot (Thai: แกงส้มชะอมทอด) is a version of the dish which features deep-fried cha-om (Acacia leaves) as one of its ingredients.
Kaeng tai pla	แกงไตปลา			South	A thick, spicy vegetable curry made with turmeric, a sauce made from fish innards (tai pla), and shrimp paste, containing roasted fish, bamboo shoots, and eggplant.
Kaeng thepho	แกงเทโพ			Central	One of the dishes mentioned in the poem of King Rama II on Thai dishes, it is a central Thai curry originally made with the fatty belly part of the Pangasius Larnaudii (thae pho; shark catfish) but now more often belly pork is used as is the case with the version shown in the photo. The other main ingredient in this curry is phak bung Chin (Chinese water spinach).
Kaeng tun	แกงตูน				A northern Thai curry made with the stalks of the Leucocasia gigantea and catfish. Leucocasia gigantea is called tun (Thai: ตูน) in the northern Thai language and khun (Thai: คูน) in standard Thai.
Kaeng yot maphrao on sai kai	แกงยอดมะพร้าวอ่อนใส่ไก่			North	A northern Thai curry made with "coconut heart" and chicken. The taste of "coconut heart" is similar to bamboo shoots but much sweeter.
Kaeng yuak	แกงหยวก			North	A northern Thai curry made with the tender core of the trunk of the banana plant.
Khua kling	คั่วกลิ้ง			South	A very spicy, dry fried curry made with chopped meat (usually beef, chicken, pork, or lamb) served with a large amount of shredded fresh kaffir lime leaves.
Khua kraduk	คั่วกระดูกหมู			South	A very spicy and, for Thai standards, "dry" curry with pork ribs and it is a Southern Thai speciality.
Yam chin kai	ยำจิ๊นไก่			North	A curry dish from Northern Thailand containing chicken. The version in the image also contains sliced banana flower.
Kaeng ranchuan	แกงรัญจวน			Central	Kaeng ranchuan is a beef curry and fermented shrimp paste chili sauce, similar to tom yam. It was created by chef in royal households from the leftovers and turned in new dish by combining pieces of meat and leftover sauce especially nam phrik kapi. The most popular of all dip is nam phrik kapi, a very delicious sauce of Thailand because this sauce can be eaten with everything. Many Thai chefs reformed kaeng ranchuan to restaurants after it was mentioned by culinary authority ML Nueang Ninrat, in a memoir explaining her life during the reign of King Rama V and VI. The people misunderstand about the origin and preparation of kaeng ranchuan because of famous TV series that do the wrong method of this dish and make people remember that this is the real kaeng ranchuan preparation method. So, the real kaeng ranchuan is in ML Ninrat book "Life in the Palace" she tells how her grandmother, the princess Sabai Ninrat created this dish. At the end of dinner there was leftovers so she asked her assistant to separate the meat from chili and basil. Then, she mixed it into a broth and added leftover of Nam prhrik kapi, so this is called the real kaeng ranchuan.

=== Soups ===
Thai name	Thai script	English name	Image	Region	Description
Kai tun ya chin	ไก่ตุ๋นยาจีน				The name literally translates to "chicken stewed with Chinese medicine". It contains medicinal herbs, one of them the dried fruit of the wolfberry, a.k.a. goji berries (Thai: เก๋ากี้; kaoki). The dish is of Chinese origin.
Leng saep	เล้งแซ่บ				Spicy and sour pork spine soup.
Nam sup	น้ำซุป				This is a clear broth, usually served together with khao man kai (chicken rice), khao mok (Thai biryani), khao kha mu (pork trotter simmered in soy sauce served with rice), khao na pet (red roast duck on rice), or khao mu daeng (red roast pork on rice). The broth can be made from chicken or pork, or it can be wholly vegetarian. The version served with duck is usually made from duck bones. It will often contain sliced hua chai thao (white radish; also known as phak kat hua in Thai) and hua chai po khem (a Chinese ingredient of dried and salted chopped turnip). Garlic, ginger, and pepper are often used as additional ingredients. It is most often garnished with fresh coriander leaves or spring onion.
Tom chuet	แกงจืด	Clear vegetable soup			A light vegetable, chicken or pork broth with vegetables and celery, to which minced pork, soft tofu, seaweed, glass noodles, and mushroom can be added. This soup can also be called Kaeng chuet (Thai: แกงจืดวุ้นเส้น).
Tom kha kai	ต้มข่าไก่	Coconut soup with chicken		Central	A mild to spicy soup with coconut milk, galangal (kha) and chicken. Mushrooms can be added to the chicken or substitute it.
Tom khlong	ต้มโคล้ง				It is a spicy and sour soup somewhat similar to Tom yam. The sourness however does not derive from lime juice but through the use of tamarind juice. The version in the image contains fried smoked fish, tomato, and mushrooms.
Tom mara	ต้มมะระ	Bitter melon soup			A clear soup made with bitter melon (also known as bitter gourd; Momordica charantia) of Chinese origin. It is often stuffed with minced pork or with minced pork mixed with glass noodles as on this image. The full name of the latter version would then be tom mara yat sai mu sap wunsen.
Tom phak kat dong mu	ต้มผักกาดดองหมู				A soup of boiled pickled Chinese cabbage and pork ribs. This dish is Chinese in origin.
Tom saep	ต้มแซ่บ	Hot and sour Isan soup		Northeast	A spicy soup made with stewed meat (usually pork, chicken or beef), roasted fresh herbs and spices, ground roasted rice, and generous amounts of lime juice and fresh herbs just before serving.
Tom som kraduk mu	ต้มส้มกระดูกหมู				Tom som translates to "sour soup". This particular version is a basic one with only pork ribs (kraduk mu) and it derives its sourness from lime juice. Other types of tom som can also use tamarind for acidity, or a combination of both lime and tamarind, and can be made from a multitude of ingredients: meats as well as seafood, and vegetables.
Tom yam	ต้มยำ	Tom yum soup		Central	A hot and sour broth made from lemon grass, galangal, kaffir lime leaves, dried chili peppers, and lime juice, usually with prawns (Tom yam kung) or chicken (Tom yam kai).
Tom yuea phai	ต้มเยื่อไผ่				It is a clear broth with, amongst other ingredients, yuea phai ("bamboo fungus"; Phallus indusiatus)

=== Salads ===
Thai name	Thai script	English name	Image	Region	Description
Khao yam	ข้าวยำ			South	A type of Thai rice salad. Here it is shown unmixed, as served at a southern Thai eatery in Korat. This particular version used pomelo, bean sprouts, lime leaves, and toasted coconut flakes, and dried shrimp flakes with the rice.
Koi pla	ก้อยปลา			Northeast	Minced or finely chopped raw fish in spicy salad dressing. It is a popular raw fish dish in Isan and a common source of infection with Opisthorchis viverrini (Southeast Asian liver fluke).
Kung chae nampla	กุ้งแช่น้ำปลา				A Thai salad made from fresh raw shrimp soaked in Thai fish sauce and served with sliced bitter gourd, mint, and a spicy sauce made with raw garlic, chillies, lime juice, sugar, and fresh cilantro/coriander.
Kung ten	กุ้งเต้น	Dancing shrimp		Northeast	A yam-style salad made with raw, and often still alive and "dancing", freshwater shrimp. Shrimp of the species Macrobrachium lanchesteri are often used.
Lap Isan	ลาบอีสาน	Larb		Northeast	Northeastern style lap is a spicy and sour salad of minced raw or cooked meat (mainly pork, chicken or duck), shallots or onions, lime juice, fish sauce, chillies, ground roasted rice and mint.
Lap nuea	ลาบเหนือ			North	Northern Thai lap is completely different from lap from northeastern Thailand. Northern Thai lap is made by mixing raw or cooked minced meat (mainly pork, beef, chicken or fish) with an elaborate mix of dry spices and herbs. The northern Thai lap does not contain lime juice or fish sauce. The version in the image is lap khua, meaning that the meat has been fried.
Lap nuea dip	ลาบเนื้อดิบ			North	A northern Thai lap-style salad of sliced raw beef (the version in the image also shows slices of raw beef tripe) and ground, dried spices.
Mu nam tok	หมูน้ำตก	Spicy meat salad		Northeast	A very spicy salad made with pork (mu) and somewhat identical to lap, except that the meat is cut into thin strips rather than minced.
Naem khluk	แหนมคลุก				Naem sausage (pork fermented with sticky rice) is mixed with boiled rice and then deep-fried. The salad is made by crumbling the deep-fried balls and mixing in sliced shallots, dried chillies, fish sauce and lime juice. It is served with raw vegetables and herbs.
Nuea yang nam tok	เนื้อย่างน้ำตก			Northeast	With a similar "dressing" as larb, this dish is made with sliced grilled beef. "Nam tok" means "waterfall" in Thai and it is thought that the meat juices should run out from the meat like a waterfall.
Phla kung	พล่ากุ้ง				A spicy salad of prawns, sliced lemongrass, culantro or other herbs, and shallots, with a dressing of lime juice, sweet chilli paste (Nam phrik phao – optional), fish sauce, pounded garlic and bird's eye chili. The version shown in the image also contained minced pork.
Phla mu	พล่าหมู				A spicy salad of sliced grilled pork, sliced lemongrass, mint, culantro (optional) and shallots, with a dressing of lime juice, sweet chili paste (Nam phrik phao – optional), fish sauce, pounded garlic and bird's eye chili.
Phla nuea makhuea on	พล่าเนื้อมะเขืออ่อน				A Thai salad made with medium rare beef and Thai aubergines. The sliced, raw eggplants are mixed in with the warm beef to soften them (makhuea on means "soft aubergine"). This particular version of the salad was served with a nam tok-style dressing.
Sa nuea	ส้าเนื้อ			North	A northern Thai speciality, made with blanched medium rare, thinly sliced beef. Other ingredients for this dish are the elaborate phrik lap Lanna spices-and-chilli mix, onions, some broth, and fresh herbs.
Sa nuea sadung	ส้าเนื้อสะดุ้ง			North	A northern Thai speciality, made with sauteed medium rare, thinly sliced beef. Other ingredients for this dish are the elaborate phrik lap Lanna spices-and-chili mix, onions, some broth, and fresh herbs such as kraphao (holy basil) or phak phai (Vietnamese coriander) although this particular version was made using saranae (spearmint). This particular version also contained nam phia, the partially digested contents from the first of the four stomachs of cattle, for added flavour.
Som tam khai khem	ส้มตำไข่เค็ม				A variation of the standard papaya som tam with salted eggs.
Som tam pu	ส้มตำปู				Green papaya salad with brined rice paddy crabs.
Som tam	ส้มตำ	Green Papaya salad		Central	Som tam which contains peanuts, is the Central Thai dish that became famous internationally
Tam khanun	ตำขนุน			North	A spicy Northern Thai salad made with boiled green whole jackfruit which has been mashed with a mortar and pestle, and minced pork. It is normally eaten with sticky rice and (as seen on the image) with khaep mu (pork cracklings).
Tam maak hoong	ตำหมากหุ่ง			Northeast	This version is more spicy, salty, and less sweet of som tam that contains pla ra (a sauce of fermented fish), and very often also brined rice paddy crabs, and makok (the fruit of the Spondias mombin) besides the usual ingredients for som tam. It does not however contain peanuts.
Tam makhuea	ตำมะเขือ			North	Chopped and then pounded grilled long green eggplant (makhuea yao; Thai: มะเขือยาว), grilled green chili peppers, raw garlic and salt put in a banana leaf package mixed together with hard-boiled egg. It's a speciality of Northern Thailand where it is traditionally eaten with sticky rice.
Tam mamuang	ตำมะม่วง				A som tam style salad with tangy unripe mango "au Julienne" as its main ingredient. The version in the image contains pla haeng thot, deep-fried sun-dried anchovies.
Tam maphrao on sen mi krop	ตำมะพร้าวอ่อนเส้นหมี่กรอบ				A som tam style salad made with the meat of a young coconut and served with crispy deep-fried thin Chinese rice noodles.
Tam mu yo	ตำหมูยอ				A spicy Thai salad made with mu yo, a Thai pork sausage which is often also described in Thailand as "Vietnamese sausage". The dressing is somewhat similar to that of som tam.
Tam phonlamai ruam	ตำผลไม้รวม				The fruits used in this particular salad show the fusion aspect of Thai cuisine, as it incorporates "modern" (for Thais) fruit such as apples and grapes besides traditional fruit such as pineapple and guava. The dressing is made with pounded garlic, sugar, chili peppers, dried shrimp, lime juice and fish sauce, and is similar to that of som tam.
Tam som-o nam pu	ตำส้มโอน้ำปู			North	It is a spicy pomelo salad which uses crab extract as a flavouring. This black sauce is achieved by pounding pu na ("ricefield crabs", Somanniathelphusa) to a pulp, straining the juices which are then boiled and reduced until the sauce becomes as thick as molasses.
Yam bai cha	ยำใบชา				A spicy Thai salad made with young, fresh tea leaves.
Yam hu mu	ยำหูหมู				It is a salad made with thinly sliced, boiled pig's ears, the version in the image also contained fresh mint, lime juice, shallots, lemon grass, fish sauce and sugar.
Yam hua pli thot	ยำหัวปลีทอด				A spicy Thai yam-style salad with deep-fried slices of banana blossom as its main ingredient.
Yam hoi khraeng	ยำหอยแครง				A spicy Thai salad made with blood cockles.
Yam khai dao	ยำไข่ดาว				A spicy Thai salad made with fried egg (khai dao).
Yam khamin khao kung	ยำขมิ้นขาวกุ้ง				A spicy Thai salad made with finely sliced (au Julienne) "white curcuma" (probably Curcuma zedoaria), shredded coconut, cooked prawns, sliced shallots, dried chillies, fresh green bird's eye chili peppers, roasted cashew nuts, and crispy fried onion rings.
Yam kun chiang	ยำกุนเชียง				A Thai salad made with a sweet dried pork sausage called kun chiang. This sausage is of Chinese origin. This dish is often eaten with plain rice congee (khao tom kui; Thai: ข้าวต้มกุ๊ย).
Yam mu krop	ยำหมูกรอบ				A Thai salad made with crispy belly pork (mu krop).
Yam mu yo	ยำหมูยอ				A spicy yam-style Thai salad with mu yo (Vietnamese sausage).
Yam mu yo thot khai dao	ยำหมูยอทอดไข่ดาว				A spicy Thai salad made with crispy fried mu yo (Vietnamese sausage) and khai dao (fried egg).
Yam naem sot	ยำแหนมสด				A Thai salad containing sausage made from fermented raw pork and sticky rice (naem sausage).
Yam naem khao khot	ยำแหนมข้าวทอด	Thai croquette salad			A Thai salad made of crumbled, crispy-fried curried rice balls (similar to a spherical croquette), fermented pork sausage, shallots, green chili peppers or dried chili flakes, peanuts, lime juice, fish sauce, and onion.
Yam no mai	ยำหน่อไม้			North	A Northern Thai salad made with strips of boiled bamboo shoots, shallots, herbs, fish sauce, lime juice, and chili peppers.
Yam no mai sai nam pu	ยำหน่อไม้ใส่น้ำปู			North	A northern Thai salad made with boiled bamboo shoots and a thick paste made from the rice paddy crabs.
Yam nuea yang	ยำเนื้อย่าง	Thai grilled beef salad			A spicy salad of grilled beef, shallots, and Thai celery or spearmint.
Yam phak khut	ยำผักกูด				A salad of edible fern shoots (Diplazium esculentum) and pork.
Yam pla duk fu	ยำปลาดุกฟู	"Exploded" catfish salad			Crispy fried shredded pla duk (catfish) served with a spicy and tangy green mango salad.
Yam pla khem	ยำปลาเค็ม				A Thai salad (yam) made with fried sun-dried salted fish (pla khem).
Yam pla salit	ยำปลาสลิด				A Thai salad made with deep-fried, sun-dried snakeskin gourami..
Yam pla thu	ยำปลาทู				Made with short mackerel (pla thu).
Yam sanat	ยำสะนัด			North	A northern Thai salad of roughly chopped, blanched vegetables that are then refried with a chili paste. It is served here together with northern Thai pork cracklings and deep-fried, sun-dried chili peppers.
Yam som-o	ยำส้มโอ				A salad made with pomelo. The other ingredients are: sliced red bird's eye chili peppers, deep-fried sun-dried anchovies, roasted peanuts, fish sauce and tamarind juice.
Yam takhrai kung sot	ยำตะไคร้กุ้งสด				A spicy "yam-style" salad with finely sliced raw lemongrass and prawns.
Yam thale	ยำทะเล				A spicy salad with mixed seafood (cuttlefish, shelled prawns, mussels), shallots, lime juice, fish sauce and Thai celery.
Yam thua phu	ยำถั่วพู				A Thai salad with winged beans, salted eggs, toasted coconut, shallots, fish sauce, lime juice and chillies. The version in this image also contains squid.
Yam wun sen	ยำวุ้นเส้น	Thai glass noodle salad			A spicy salad with glass noodles (cellophane noodles), minced chicken or pork and often either mixed seafood, squid or prawns. Cloud ear fungus also often features in this dish.

=== Fried and stir-fried dishes ===
Thai name	Thai script	English name	Image	Region	Description
Kai phat khing	ไก่ผัดขิง	Stir-fired sliced ginger with chicken		Central	A simple dish of fried slices of chicken with sliced ginger, soy sauce, fish sauce, and chili peppers.
Kai phat met mamuang himmaphan	ไก่ผัดเม็ดมะม่วงหิมพานต์	Stir-fried chicken with cashew nuts		Central	The Thai Chinese version of the Sichuan style fried chicken with cashew nuts known as Kung Pao chicken, stir-fried with whole dried chili peppers.
Khai yat sai	ไข่ยัดไส้	Stuffed omelette			An omelette is fried filled with various ingredients of choice (minced beef or pork, prawns, and vegetables) and then folded over.
Khua chin som sai khai	คั่วจิ๊นส้มใส่ไข่			North	Northern Thai pickled pork stir-fried with egg.
Khua ho	คั่วห่อ			North	Glass noodles are stir-fried with left-overs from other dishes. Unlike kaeng ho, this dish will not contain any left-over curry dishes. It was traditionally eaten at the end of a ceremony or festival. It is served here with pork rinds.
Khua no mai sai mu	คั่วหน่อไม้ใส่หมู			North	Stir-fried bamboo shoots with pork. In this particular version, the pork is minced.
Kaphrao hoi lai	กะเพราหอยลาย	Stir-fried baby clams with thai holy basil			Undulated surf clam stir-fried with holy basil (Ocimum tenuiflorum)
Khai luk khoei	ไข่ลูกเขย				Boiled eggs are (deep-)fried until crispy on the outside, and then served sliced with a tangy sauce made from tamarind juice. The Thai name literally translates as "son-in-law eggs".
Kung thot krathiam phrik Thai	กุ้งทอดกระเทียมพริกไทย	Deep fried prawns with garlic and pepper			Prawns fried with garlic and fresh peppercorns.
Mu krop phat kaphrao	หมูกรอบผัดกะเพรา	Stir-fried holy basil with crispy pork			Slices of crispy grilled pork are stirred-fried with holy basil. This particular version is served with khai dao (fried egg) which had the egg yolk removed before frying and then added on later.
Mu phat sato	หมูผัดสะตอ	Stir-fired pork with stink beans			Sliced pork stir-fried with sato (the beans of the Parkia speciosa, also known as "stink bean" or "bitter bean"), onion, garlic, fish sauce, chili peppers, and oyster sauce.
Mu phat sato phak Tai	หมูผัดสะตอภาคใต้			South	A spicy, southern Thai, version of mu phat sato where the pork and "stink beans" are fried with a copious amount of chili peppers and chili paste.
Mu wan	หมูหวาน			South	Sliced pork is simmered or fried with sugar and soy sauce until the sauce is reduced and coats the meat.
No mai farang phat kung	หน่อไม้ฝรั่งผัดกุ้ง	Stir-fried asparagus with prawns			Green asparagus stir-fried with prawns, garlic, sliced chili peppers, fish sauce, and oyster sauce.
Nuea phat bai yira	เนื้อผัดใบยี่หร่า	Stir-fried beef with African basil			Besides beef and basil, other ingredients are garlic, chili peppers, light soy sauce, and fish sauce. African basil leaves have a slight anise taste.
Pak boong fai daeng	ผักบุ้งไฟแดง	Stir-fried morning-glory			Morning-glory (a.k.a. water spinach) stir fried with yellow bean sauce, garlic, and chili peppers. It is a very popular vegetable dish in Thailand.
Phak khana nam man hoi	ผักคะน้าน้ำมันหอย	Stir-fried Chinese kale with oyster sauce			Originally a Chinese dish, it has been adapted to Thai taste by adding fish sauce to the recipe and by omitting the ginger. Here it is made with fried shiitake mushroom.
Phat buap	ผัดบวบ	Stir-fried luffa			Stir-fried luffa (sponge gourd) with pork/shrimp and egg or just egg.
Phat dok hom	ผัดดอกหอม	Stir-fried onion flower stem with pork/liver			Stir-fried onion flowers with pork and pork liver.
Phat khana mu krop	ผัดคะน้าหมูกรอบ	Stir-fried Chinese kale with crispy pork		Central	Khana (gailan or Chinese kale) is stir fried with crispy pork (mu krop), garlic, oyster sauce, soy sauce, peppercorns, and (optionally) sliced chili peppers.
Phat khanaeng mu	ผัดแขนงหมู				Stir-fried khanaeng with pork, garlic, oyster sauce, fish sauce, and white pepper. Khanaeng are the sprouts of Chinese broccoli and grow from the root after the main stem has been harvested. The taste is in between Brussels sprouts and kale, and very sweet.
Phat kaphrao	ผัดกะเพรา	Stir-fired minced meat with thai holy basil			Minced beef, pork, chicken, or whole prawns stir fried with Thai holy basil, chili peppers, garlic, and soy sauce.
Phat naem sai khai	ผัดแหนมไส่ไข่	Stir-fired fermented pork with egg			Naem sausage (made from fermented raw pork skin and sticky rice) stir fried with egg.
Phat no mai sai khai	ผัดหน่อไม้ใส่ไข่	Stir-fried bamboo shoots with egg			Stir-fried bamboo shoots and egg.
Phat phak khom	ผัดผักโขม	Stir-fried thai spinach with egg and minced pork			Thai spinach (Amaranthus spinosus; Thai name: Phak khom nam; Thai script: ผักโขมหนาม) is often stir-fried with minced pork and egg.
Phat phak ruam	ผัดผักรวม	Stir fried mixed vegetables			Stir fried combination of vegetables depending on availability and preference, but it is usually fried with oyster sauce.
Phat phrik khing	ผัดพริก	Stir-fried pork with Thai chili peppers			Sliced pork fried with asparagus beans and kaffir lime leaves in a sweet chili paste. Sometimes red curry paste is used instead of the phrik khing chili paste.
Phat yot fak maeo	ผัดยอดฟักแม้ว	Stir-fried mountain melon greens			Yot sayongte, which is also known in Thailand as yot fak meao (yot meaning "shoots"), are the young vines and leaves of a certain type of melon (chayote, originally from Central America) which in Thailand grows mainly in the mountains up north. These greens have a very sweet taste and combine extremely well with oyster sauce.
Phunim phat phong kari	ปูนิ่มผัดผงกะหรี่	Stir-fried soft-shelled crab with curry powder			Deep-fried pieces of soft-shell crab which have been stir-fried with egg and curry powder.
Pla duk phat phet	ปลาดุกผัดเผ็ด	Stir-fired sliced catfish with red curry paste			Slices of catfish (most often pre-fried) are stir-fried in a sauce made with red curry paste. The pea eggplant feature in this dish is for added taste and texture.
Pla kaphong phat khuen chai	ปลากะพงผัดขึ้นฉ่าย	Stir-fried Chinese celery with barramundi			Barramundi (often called "sea bass" in Thailand) stir-fried with Chinese celery, light soy sauce, garlic, ginger, and fermented soy beans.
Pla muek phat phrik phao	ปลาหมึกผัดพริกเผา	Stir-fried squid with chilli paste			Squid stir-fried with sweet and mild chili paste (nam phrik phao), onion, garlic, spring onion, and sliced large red chili peppers. Paprika can be used instead of chili peppers if a milder version is preferred.
Tap kai phat phrik sot	ตับไก่ผัดพริกสด	Stir-fried chicken liver with green peppers			Chicken liver fried with young (mainly green) chili peppers, light soy sauce, oyster sauce, onion, spring onion, black pepper, and garlic. Here it is served with rice and a fried egg (khai dao).
Thua ngok pla khem	ถั่วงอกปลาเค็ม	Stir-fried bean sprouts with salted fish			A stir-fried dish of mung bean sprouts, salted fish, chili peppers, and garlic.

=== Deep-fried dishes ===
Thai name	Thai script	English name	Image	Region	Description
Kai ho bai toei	ไก่ห่อใบเตย	Chicken wrapped in pandan leaves		Central	Pieces of marinated chicken are wrapped in fragrant pandan leaves and then deep fried.
Kai thot takhrai	ไก่ทอดตะไคร้	Deep fried chicken and lemongrass			Pieces of chicken are deep fried together with finely chopped or shredded lemongrass, and served with a sweet chili sauce.
Kai thot	ไก่ทอด	Deep-fried chicken			The version of kai thot as shown in the image is made in the Southern Thai manner, having been marinated with khamin (turmeric) and served with krueng thae (crispy fried chopped garlic and turmeric) as a topping.
Khaep mu	แคบหมู	Pork rinds			Deep fried pork skin that is eaten with nam phrik num (grilled green chili dip) from Chiang Mai is renowned in the whole of Thailand.
Mu krop	หมูกรอบ	Crispy pork			Cooked belly pork is first marinated and then deep fried until crispy. Often used sliced in vegetables stir fries.
Mu thot krathiam	หมูทอดกระเทียม				Deep-fried pork and garlic
Nang kai thot	หนังไก่ทอด	Crispy fried chicken skins			Crispy, deep-fried chicken skin that can be eaten as a snack or together with chili pastes or salads.
No yat sai thot	หน่อยัดไส้ทอด			North	A northern Thai speciality of deep-fried bamboo shoots with a filling of minced pork.
Pik kai sot sai thot	ปีกไก่สอดไส้ทอด	Stuffed chicken wings			Deep fried, partially deboned chicken wings, stuffed usually with minced pork.
Pla buang	ปลาบ้วง			North	Cuts of Giant snakehead fish (pla chado) are first salted and sun-dried for three days, and then deep-fried. This dish is somewhat similar to pla chado daet diao from central Thailand but there the fish is only dried for only one day, making the taste less intense.
Pla krai thot krathiam	ปลากรายทอดกระเทียม				Deep-fried pla krai ("Clown Knifefish") and garlic. It is served with a spicy dipping sauce on the side made from coriander root, lime juice, fresh bird's eye chili peppers, garlic, sugar, and fish sauce.
Pla nin thot samun phrai	ปลานิลทอดสมุนไพร				Deep-fried pla nin ("Nile Tilipia") served with deep-fried herbs such as lemongrass, kaffir lime leaves, garlic, and fingerroot (Boesenbergia rotunda). A chili-lime dip is served on the side as a condiment.
Pla sam rot	ปลาสามรส	Three flavours fish		Central	Deep fried fish with a sweet, tangy, and spicy tamarind sauce.
Pla thot	ปลาทอด	Deep-fried fish			A simple deep-fried fish, most often served with a spicy dipping sauce. The fish in this image is pla nin, a Nile Tilapia.
Pla thot khamin	ปลาทอดขมิ้น			South	Typical for southern Thai cuisine, this deep-fried fish has first been marinated in a spice mixture which includes a large amount of turmeric (khamin). In addition, this particular version was topped with crispy deep-fried chopped garlic and turmeric. It is often served with raw vegetables on the side, and a spicy dipping sauce.
Pla wong thot	ปลาวงทอด				Deep-fried pla wong (literally meaning "circle fish"): fish which have first been cut open, arranged into a circle and then sun-dried. Here it is served Southern Thai style with a spoonful of a deep-fried mix of minced garlic, galangal, and turmeric.
Pu cha	ปูจ๋า	Crab cakes			A mixture of cooked crab meat, pork, garlic, and pepper, fried deeply inside the crab shells and usually served with nam chim buoy (Thai: น้ำจิ้มบ๋วย, plum sauce). Instead of being fried in the crab shell, it is also sometimes served as patties.
Sai mu thot	ไส้หมูทอด				Deep-fried pork intestines
Si khrong mu thot	ซี่โครงหมูทอด				Deep-fried pork ribs. The version in the image however, had first been boiled, then marinated, then deep-fried with garlic, and then again stir-fried with a sweet and tangy tamarind sauce just before serving.

=== Grilled dishes ===
Thai name	Thai script	English name	Image	Region	Description
Aep mu	แอ็บหมู			North	A Northern Thai "soufflé" of egg, minced pork, herbs, and curry paste that is slowly grilled inside a banana leaf wrapper over a charcoal fire.
Aep ong-o	แอ็บอ่องออ			North	Roughly chopped pig's brain mixed with egg and curry paste are grilled over a low fire, wrapped inside banana leaves.
Aep pla noi	แอ็บปลาน้อย			North	Freshwater small fry and brine shrimp are mixed with curry paste and then grilled over a low fire wrapped inside banana leaves.
Chin som mok	จิ๊นส้มหมก			North	Chin som is the northern Thai version of the pickled pork sausage called naem. In chin som mok (lit. "covered chin som") the pickled pork is grilled inside a banana leaf before serving.
Kai yang	ไก่ย่าง	Grilled chicken		Northeast	Grilled marinated chicken, usually eaten together with Som tam (papaya salad).
Kho mu yang kratha ron	คอหมูย่างกระทะร้อน				Kho mu yang kratha ron literally translates to "pork neck grilled on a hot skillet".
Kung yang/kung phao	กุ้งย่าง/กุ้งเผา	Grilled prawns			Grilled prawns are normally served with a nam chim, a spicy dipping sauce, made with mashed raw garlic and green bird's eye chili peppers, sugar, fish sauce, and lime juice.
Mu manao	หมูมะนาว	Pork with lime juice			Sliced grilled pork with a dressing (nam chim) of mashed garlic, green bird's eye chili peppers, sugar, fish sauce, and lime juice. Here it is served with additional sliced bird's eye chili peppers and raw garlic on a bed of ice-water chilled sliced raw phak khana (Chinese broccoli)
Mu yang	หมูย่าง	Isan grilled pork		Northeast	Originally from the Isan region of Thailand, the fatty parts of belly pork, together with the skin, are preferred over lean meat. It is served with nam chim chaeo, a spicy dipping sauce made with dried chili peppers, and roasted sticky rice.
Nuea ping	เนื้อปิ้ง				Marinated and barbecued beef.
Nuea thup	เนื้อทุบ			North	Beef is pounded after grilling, and served with a chili dip.
Pam khai mot	ป่ามไข่มด			North	Grilled banana leaf cups containing a mixture of ant eggs, chicken eggs and some salt. After grilling the dish is sprinkled with chopped spring onion and pepper. The ant eggs make the dish much more creamy. It can also be eaten as a snack.
Paeng nom yang nuea	แป้งนมย่างอมเนื้อ			North	Grilled cow udders, served with a chili dip.
Pla ping top	ปลาปิ้งตบ			Northeast	Traditional grilled fish of Tai Dam people in Loei.Catch the fish to clean the scales, then peck the fish along the back of the spine instead of the belly so that the soft fish will fold up more easily and the spice stuffed in the belly of the fish exposed to embers will give fragrance to infuse the fish meat.
Sai krok Isan	ไส้กรอกอีสาน			Northeast	Grilled, fermented pork and sticky rice sausage, originally from the Isan region of Thailand. It can be shaped like a sausage as in the image, or as round balls. It is also often eaten as a snack at festivals and fairs, and served together with sliced ginger, bird's eye chili peppers, and raw cabbage.
Sai mu ping	ไส้หมูปิ้ง				Marinated and barbecued pork intestines.
Sai ua	ไส้อั่ว	"Chiang mai sausage"		North	A grilled sausage of ground pork mixed with spices and herbs, and which is often served with chopped fresh ginger and chili peppers at a meal.
Suea rong hai	เสือร้องไห้	Weeping tiger beef		Northeast	Suea rong hai literally means "weeping tiger". It is grilled marinated beef which is eaten with vegetables and Nam chim chaeo dipping sauce.
Yang ruam mu	ย่างรวมหมู	Grilled mixed pork		North	A northern Thai dish of different cuts of pork (including pig udder) that have been grilled. It is served with a dipping sauce.

=== Steamed or blanched dishes ===
Thai name	Thai script	English name	Image	Region	Description
Bai po	ใบปอ	Jute leaves			Eaten blanched as a dish with khao tom kui (plain rice congee), the taste is similar to that of spinach or samphire.
Ho mok pla	ห่อหมกปลา	Steamed fish curry		Central	A Thai steamed curry with fish, spices, coconut milk, and egg, steam-cooked in a banana leaf cup and topped with thick coconut cream before serving.
Ho mok maphrao on	ห่อหมกมะพร้าวอ่อน	Steamed seafood curry			A Thai steamed curry with mixed seafood and the soft meat of a young coconut, here served inside a coconut.
Pla nueng manao	ปลานึ่งมะนาว	Steamed fish with lime juice		Central	Steamed fish which is drenched in a spicy garlic, chili sauce, chicken stock and lime juice dressing.

=== Stewed dishes ===
Thai name	Thai script	English name	Image	Region	Description
Khai phalo	ไข่พะโล้				Egg stewed with meat in soy sauce, garlic, ginger and phong phalo (Thai: ผงพะโล้; five-spice powder). Meats used in khai phalo tend to be pork (belly or trotter) or chicken wings. Other ingredients, such as mushrooms and fried tofu, can also be incorporated. The dish is of Chinese origin. Similar dishes are mu phalo and kha mu phalo (using only pork, and ham hocks), kai phalo (chicken) and pet phalo (duck).

=== Dipping sauces and pastes ===
Thai name	Thai script	English name	Image	Region	Description
Nam chim chaeo	น้ำจิ้มแจ่ว			Northeast	It is a sticky, sweet and spicy dipping sauce made with dried chili peppers, fish sauce, palm sugar, lime juice, and coarsely roasted sticky rice. Often served as a dip with mu yang (grilled pork).
Nam chim kai	น้ำจิ้มไก่	Chicken chili sauce			A very common all-round chili dipping sauce with the consistency of a thick syrup, it is medium spicy and very sweet. Often used as a dipping sauce for grilled chicken (kai means "chicken"), it can also be used as a generic chili sauce for other dishes. It forms the base of a few other types of nam chim, such as nam chim thot man pla ("dipping sauce for deep-fried fish cakes").
Nam chim paesa	น้ำจิ้มแป๊ะซะ			Northeast	A spicy dipping sauce eaten with steamed fish wrapped in raw lettuce or cabbage.
Nam chim sate	น้ำจิ้มสะเต๊ะ	Peanut sauce			A peanut sauce which is normally served with satay.
Nam phrik i-ke	น้ำพริกอีเก๋			North	A northern Thai chili paste made with chili peppers, sliced aubergine, pork rinds, and fermented shrimp paste.
Nam phrik kapi	น้ำพริกกะปิ				A pungent chili dip made with shrimp paste, pounded dried shrimp, bird's eye chili peppers, garlic, lime juice, fish sauce, palm sugar, and optionally, pea sized aubergines; most often eaten as part of the dish called Nam phrik pla thu.
Nam phrik kha	น้ำพริกข่า			North	A Northern Thai fried chili paste containing galangal (kha). It is often eaten, as seen here, with steamed het nang fa (Thai script: เห็ดนางฟ้า; lit. "fairy mushroom"; Pleurotus pulmonarius).
Nam phrik khaep mu	น้ำพริกแคบหมู			North	A northern Thai chili paste of mashed grilled green chili peppers, deep-fried pork rinds, fresh garlic, and salt.
Nam phrik long ruea	น้ำพริกลงเรือ			Central	The name means "chili paste for in a boat" as it was often eaten while travelling the rivers of Thailand by boat. A sweet, savoury and spicy chili dip, it is served together with fresh vegetables, salted egg and sweet pork. This version also included khamin khao ("white curcuma") and the slightly sour and bitter leaves of makok (Spondias mombin)
Nam phrik num	น้ำพริกหนุ่ม			North	A paste of pounded roasted large green chili peppers, roasted shallots, roasted garlic, coriander leaves, lime juice, and fish sauce that is eaten with steamed and raw vegetables, khaep mu (crispy pork rind), and sticky rice.
Nam phrik ong	น้ำพริกอ่อง			North	Resembling a thick Bolognese sauce, it is made with dried chili peppers, minced pork, and tomato that is eaten with steamed vegetables, raw vegetables, and sticky rice.
Nam phrik phao	น้ำพริกเผา	Chilli jam			A sweet roasted chili paste, often used as an ingredient in Tom yam or when frying meat or seafood, and also popular as a spicy "jam" on bread or toasted bread.
Nam phrik pla chi	น้ำพริกปลาจี่			North	A chili paste made with grilled fish, roasted chili peppers, roasted shallots, and roasted garlic, lemongrass, and shrimp paste. It is normally served with both steamed and raw vegetables or other leaves.
Phrik nam pla	น้ำปลาพริก				Colloquially called phrik nam pla, it is a standard sauce served with every Thai buffet style meal, fried rice or fried noodles, and used as a kind of "salt". It is made by mixing fish sauce with some lime juice, chopped bird's eye chili peppers, and often also sliced garlic.
Pu ong	ปูอ่อง or อ่องปู			North	A northern Thai speciality that is eaten as a pungent dipping sauce for sticky rice. It is made by collecting the "fat" of rice field crabs (Parathelphusidae) and grilling this inside the crab shell.
Sot Si Racha	ซอสศรีราชา	Sriracha sauce			It is a hot sauce made from sun-ripened chili peppers, vinegar, garlic, sugar, and salt. It is commonly known in Thailand as sot Si Racha (sot is the Thai pronunciation of the English word "sauce"), but also as nam chim Si Racha or nam phrik Si Racha. The name is derived from the seaside town of Si Racha.

=== Miscellaneous ===
Thai name	Thai script	English name	Image	Region	Description
Khai dao	ไข่ดาว	Fried egg			Literally translated khai dao means "star egg", referring to the star-like shape of the egg after it has been fried. Traditionally the egg is fried in large amounts of hot vegetable oil which produces a crispy outer texture. Khai dao mai suk is a fried egg where the yolk is still runny, the way it is most commonly eaten when served with, for instance, khao phat ("fried rice") or kaphrao mu rat khao ("pork fried with holy basil served with rice"). Fried egg with a (very) hard yolk, khai dao suk (mak), is needed when the fried egg is used for making yam khai dao: fried egg salad.
Khai chiao khai mot daeng	ไข่เจียวไข่มดแดง			North	A Thai-style crispy-fried omelette which includes the eggs of the red ant.
Mu ruam luak chim	หมูรวมลวกจิ้ม				This dish consist of several types of pork (intestines, liver, and other cuts) which have been shortly blanched in boiling water or stock and then served with fried garlic, spring onions and a spicy dipping sauce.
Pla sam thap	ปลาสามทัพ				Fish prepared in 3 different ways: on the left of the image is pla sam rot (deep-fried served with a tangy sweet chili sauce), in the middle pla nueng manao (steamed fish with a raw garlic, lime and chili sauce), and on the right pla thot krathiam (deep-fried fish with deep-fried garlic).
Roti	โรตี	Roti		South	In Thailand, Roti is eaten primarily with Southern Thai curries. It is also a popular street food dessert that is topped with sweetened condensed milk.

== Savoury snacks and starters ==
Thai name	Thai script	English name	Image	Region	Description
Chingrit thot	จิ้งหรีดทอด	Deep-fried crickets			Deep-fried crickets, either Gryllus bimaculatus or, as shown in the image, Acheta domesticus. This dish is often eaten as a snack to go with drinks.
Kai rom khwan	ไก่รมควัน	Smoked chicken			Smoked chicken is often eaten as a snack to go with drinks.
Karipap	กะหรี่ปั๊บ	Curry puff or Samosa		Central	In Thailand, Karipap is a popular street food snack that is commonly made by using spring roll wrappers. The filling contains chicken, potato, onion and curry powder. These flat and triangle shaped snacks are derived from the Indian samosas.
Khaep mu	แคบหมู	Crispy pork rind		North	Deep fried crispy pork rinds, often eaten with nam phrik num and other northern Thai dips.
Khanom chip	ขนมจีบ	Siu mai			The Thai version of the Chinese steamed dumplings called siu mai in Cantonese. The color indicates the filling: the green dumplings contain a mix of minced pork and crab meat, the others have a filling of only minced pork.
Khanom kuichai	ขนมกุยช่าย	Fried chive dumplings			Originally a dish of the Teochew people called "gu chai gue" (Chinese script: 韭菜馃) in the Teochew language, these are steamed dumplings made from rice powder and a filling of garlic chives. The dipping sauce for this dish is soy sauce which often is spiced with dried chili flakes. This particular version was fried to give it a crispy texture.
Khanom Tokyo	ขนมโตเกียว				Literally translated it means "Tokyo cake", it is a Thai style crêpe wrapped around a hot dog and sweet chili sauce. The chili sauce can also be served on the side as a dip. Other versions of khanom Tokiao use yam or sweet condensed milk as a filling.
Khao phan nga muan	ข้าวพันงาม้วน			North	Rolled khao phan with sesame seeds. Khao phan is a specialty from Uttaradit province. Rice flour is mixed with water and let to ferment overnight. The resulting batter is then spread out thinly over a cloth stretched out over a steamer, covered with a hood and let to steam for a few minutes. Rolled up it is served with a chili dip.
Khao phan phak	ข้าวพันผัก			North	Khao phan are thin, steamed rice sheets made from the fermented batter of rice flour mixed with water. Here it is served as a wrap for stir-fried vegetables.
Kung sarong	กุ้งโสร่ง				Deep fried prawns wrapped in egg noodles.
Luk chin ping	ลูกชิ้นปิ้ง	Grilled meatball			Meatballs made from fish, pork, beef or chicken are grilled on a stick and served with a spicy and tangy dipping sauce. The ones shown on the image are made with pork and beef. It is commonly sold from street stalls in Thailand.
Mamuang nam pla wan	มะม่วงน้ำปลาหวาน				Tart, unripe mango served with a sweet, salty and spicy dipping sauce made from shallots, fish sauce, dried chili peppers, dried shrimp, and palm sugar (nam pla wan means "sweet fish sauce"). This is normally eaten as a snack on its own.
Miang kham	เมี่ยงคำ				Dried shrimp and other ingredients wrapped in cha phlu (Thai: ชะพลู) leaves.
Miang pla	เมี่ยงปลา				Similar to Miang kham, the main ingredient for this wrap is deep-fried fish.
Mu daet diao	หมูแดดเดียว				Deep-fried strips of sun dried pork, here with sesame seeds. A spicy dipping sauce (very often Sriracha sauce) is almost always provided with this dish.
Muek groob	หมึกกรุบ				Konjac snack with spicy flavor.
Nuea daet diao kaphrao thot	เนื้อแดดเดียวกะเพราทอด				Deep-fried strips of sun dried beef and with crispy fried holy basil.
Nuea khem thot	เนื้อเค็มทอด			North	Salted and sun-dried beef that has been deep-fried before serving.
Pla muek yang	ปลาหมึกย่าง	Grilled cuttlefish			Plainly grilled cuttlefish.
Sate	สะเต๊ะ	Satay			Marinated beef, chicken, or pork grilled on bamboo skewers and usually served with nam chim sate (peanut sauce) and achat (pickled cucumber).
Thot man khaophot/Khaophot thot	ทอดมันข้าวโพด/ข้าวโพดทอด				Deep-fried cakes made with corn and herbs in a batter and served with a sweet chili sauce
Thot man pla/Pla het	ทอดมันปลา/ปลาเห็ด	Fried fish cakes			Deep fried patties of minced fish mixed with red curry paste, finely chopped yardlong beans (tua fak yao), and finely shredded leaves of kaffir lime (makrut). Knife fish (pla krai) is popularly used. For this variety of thot man, a sweet & hot similar to chicken chili sauce is provided usually mixed with chopped pieces of cucumber, crushed peanuts, and topped with phak chi.
Thot man pu	ทอดมันปู	Fried crab cakes			Deep fried patties of minced crab meat. Plum sauce is commonly provided.
Thot man kung	ทอดมันกุ้ง	Fried prawn cakes			Another popular variety of thot man where minced shrimp or prawn is used. Plum sauce is commonly provided.
Tod Mun Hua Plee	ทอดมันหัวปลี	Fried banana blossom fritters			Tod Mun Hua Plee is one of the individual dishes in Thailand. It is made from banana blossom which is the flower of banana.
Thung thong	ถุงทอง	Money bag			Small, crispy, deep-fried pastry purses filled with a mixture of minced chicken or pork together with minced prawns, mushroom and water chestnut, and served with sweet plum sauce or Thai sweet chili sauce.
Tua mai thot	ตัวไหมทอด				Crispy, deep-fried pupae of silkworms. This dish is most often eaten as a snack in order to go with any drink.
La tiang	ล่าเตียง	Omelette with Minced Shrimp			It is an ancient Thai snack, because it appears in literature of King Rama II. It comprises shrimp, pork and peanut and wrapped by omelette to make a square shape.

== Sweet snacks and desserts ==
Thai name	Thai script	English name	Image	Region	Description
Chaokuai	เฉาก๊วย	Grass jelly			Grass jelly is made from a herb from the mint family. It is often served with only shaved ice and brown sugar.
Dara thong	ดาราทอง				Dara thong or thong ek krachang (ทองเอกกระจัง) is a golden dough ball made from wheat flour, egg yolks, coconut milk, and sugar, topped with a little piece of gold leaf, and decorated with sugar-coated, dry-fried watermelon seeds. Nowadays, it is often wrongly referred to as cha mongkut (จ่ามงกุฎ), which is the name of another Thai traditional sweet.
Foi thong	ฝอยทอง				The name translates to "golden threads", it is a sweet snack or dessert of strings of egg yolk shortly boiled in sugar syrup. This, and other egg-based sweets such as sangkhaya, were introduced to the royal court of Ayutthaya by Maria Guyomar de Pinha in the 17th century CE.
Khanom bua loi	ขนมบัวลอย				Taro root mixed with flour into balls and served in coconut milk.
Khanom chan	ขนมชั้น				A multi-colored pudding of layers of sticky rice flour and tapioca flour mixed with coconut milk and sugar. Each layer will be differently scented (pandan, jasmine and more). It is similar to the Indonesian, Malaysian and Singaporean kueh lapis.
Khanom farang kudi chin	ขนมฝรั่งกุฎีจีน	"Foreigner's snack of the Chinese church"		Bangkok	Small muffins. The main ingredients are duck eggs, sugar and wheat flour. No butter, milk or yeast. No preservatives. The little cakes are topped with raisins, gourds dipped in syrup, and persimmon.
Khanom krok	ขนมครก				Small coconut hotcakes with different fillings. These are made on a special cast-iron pan with indentations. Two-halves are eventually stuck to one another to form the finished miniature pancake.
Khanom mo kaeng	ขนมหม้อแกง				A sweet baked pudding containing coconut milk, eggs, palm sugar, and flour, sprinkled with sweet fried onions.
Khanom piak pun	ขนมเปียกปูน				The unique smoky flavor and the deep black color comes from coconut ash. It is made from a mix of sticky rice flour and tapioca flour, together with coconut milk and sugar.
Khanom tako	ขนมตะโก้				Jasmine scented coconut pudding set in cups of fragrant pandan leaf.
Khanom tako phueak	ขนมตะโก้เผือก				Traditional sweets made with coconut milk, rice, flour, sugar, and boiled taro pieces in a banana leaf cone.
Khanom tan	ขนมตาล				Palm flavoured miniature cake with shredded coconut on top.
Khanom thuai talai	ขนมถ้วยตะไล				Steamed sweet coconut jelly and cream.
Khanom tom	ขนมต้ม			Central	These sweets are made by boiling balls of dough made from glutinous rice powder, coconut cream, grated coconut, sugar, and flavorings. Then they are covered with more grated coconut.
Khanom tom	ขนมต้ม			South	A Southern Thai snack made from sticky rice, coconut milk, sugar, and salt. The mixture is wrapped in a young mangrove fan palm leaf, formed into a triangle shape, and then boiled or steamed until cooked. Eaten during the Chak Phra Festival.
Khanom wun	ขนมวุ้น				These are desserts made with an agar gelatin and the colors represent different flavors.
Khao niao mamuang	ข้าวเหนียวมะม่วง	Mango with sticky rice			Sticky rice cooked in sweetened thick coconut milk, served with slices of ripe mango.
Khao niao sangkhaya	ข้าวเหนียวสังขยา				Sticky rice served with an egg and coconut custard (coconut jam).
Khao tom mat	ข้าวต้มมัด				The dish is made by wrapping sweet banana and sticky rice inside a banana leaf and then steaming it. The banana takes on a pink color after steaming.
Kluai thot	กล้วยทอด				Deep-fried bananas in a light batter.
Kraya sat	กระยาสารท				Wafers or chunks of rice candy with beans and sesame. Often prepared as an offering to the monks.
Lot chong nam kathi	ลอดช่องน้ำกะทิ	Cendol			Pandan-flavored rice flour noodles in sweetened coconut milk, similar to the Indonesian cendol.
Mamuang dong	มะม่วงดอง	Pickled mango			Pickled green mango is often eaten as a semi-sweet snack.
Roti kluai	โรตีกล้วย	Roti with banana			Sliced banana and beaten eggs are fried inside a thin sheet of dough, then cut and served with sweetened condensed milk or sugar.
Roti sai mai	โรตีสายไหม				An extremely sweet kind of cotton candy which is wrapped inside small, thin pancakes.
Ruam mit	รวมมิตร				A chilled sweet snack/dessert with a mix of ingredients, such as sweetened chestnuts, jackfruit, lotus root, tapioca, and lot chong, in sweetened coconut milk.
Sangkhaya fak thong	สังขยาฟักทอง	Pumpkin-coconut custard			Steamed pumpkin with an egg-and-coconut custard filling, similar to the coconut jam from Malaysia, Indonesia and the Philippines.
Sakhu thua dam	สาคูถั่วดำ				Tapioca pearls and black beans (one of the vigna cultivars) with sweetened coconut milk and the flesh of a young coconut.
That khai	ทาร์ตไข่	Egg tart			The Thai version of the Portuguese pastel de nata.
Sakhu sai mu	สาคูไส้หมู	Tapioca Balls with Pork Filling			In Thailand tapioca balls with pork filling are call sakhu sai mu. Sakhu sai mu is a kind of snack which is very famous in Thailand and found at street stalls and markets. It is a dumpling which consists of a flour ball with a pork filling. Most people in Thailand eat it with khao kriap pak mo.
Thong yip	ทองหยิบ				Thong yip is made from egg yolks like foi thong. The difference is that instead of being thread-like, thong yip are shaped like flowers.

== Drinks ==
Thai name	Thai script	English name	Image	Region	Description
Cha dam yen	ชาดำเย็น	Black iced tea			It is made from strongly brewed black tea ("red tea" in East Asia). The tea is sweetened with sugar and served with ice.
Cha manao	ชามะนาว	Lime flavored tea			It is made from strongly brewed black tea ("red tea" in East Asia). The tea is sweetened with sugar flavored with sugar and lime and served hot or with ice. Mint may also be added.
Cha ron	ชาร้อน	Thai hot tea			It is made from strongly brewed black tea ("red tea" in East Asia). The tea is sweetened with sugar and condensed milk and served hot.
Nam wan	น้ำหวาน	Concentrated artificial fruit-flavored syrup			Normally poured on grated ice.
Cha yen	ชาเย็น	Thai iced tea			It is made from strongly brewed black tea ("red tea" in East Asia). Additional ingredients may include orange blossom water, star anise, crushed tamarind seed and sometimes other spices. The tea is sweetened with sugar and condensed milk and served chilled.
Kafae boran	กาแฟโบราณ				Kafae boran literally translates to "ancient/traditional coffee". It is a strong coffee that is served with sweetened condensed milk, similar in taste to the kopi that is served at kopi tiam (traditional coffee shops) of Malaysia and Singapore. It is usually made with robusta coffee beans, by steeping the grounds inside a brewing "sock".
Krating Daeng	กระทิงแดง	Thai red bull			An energy drink and the origin of Red Bull.
Lao Khao	เหล้าขาว	Thai rice whisky			A distilled alcohol made from Thai rice, it is often a home-made moonshine.
Lao Mae Khong	เหล้าแม่โขง	Mekhong			Closer to a rum, it is distilled from sugarcane and rice.
Nam bai bua bok	น้ำใบบัวบก	Gotu kola juice			A refreshing drink made from the leaves of the Asiatic Pennywort (Centella asiatica).
Nam dok anchan	น้ำดอกอัญชัน	Clitoria ternatea drink			A refreshing drink made from Clitoria ternatea flower flavored with sugar served with ice.
Nam manao	น้ำมะนาว	Lime drink			A refreshing drink made from lime juice flavored with sugar and a pinch of salt served with ice.
Nam phan	น้ำพันช์	Thai punch			Resembling a slush puppie laced with alcohol, this drink is popular with students. Nam means liquid or water, phan is derived from the English word "punch": a beverage based on fruit and often containing alcohol.
Nam takhrai	น้ำตะไคร้	Lemongrass tea			A refreshing drink made from lemongrass. It can be served either hot or with ice.
Nom yen	นมเย็น	Thai pink milk			A drink made from sala syrup and hot milk.
Mod kaew	หมดแก้ว				Mod kaew literally translates to bottoms up. It is made from Chang beer, soju and Sprite.
Oliang	โอเลี้ยง	Iced black coffee			A sweet Thai black ice coffee. The name is of Teochew origin where "o" means black, and "liang" means cold.
Saeng som	แสงโสม	Sang Som			A Thai rum which has been distilled since 1977.
Satho	สาโท	Thai rice wine			A traditional rice wine from the Isan region.

== See also ==
- Thai cuisine
- List of Thai ingredients
- List of Thai restaurants
- Phuket cuisine
