= Tha Din Daeng, Bangkok =

Market and neighbourhood in Bangkok, Thailand

Coordinates: 13°44′12.62″N 100°30′13.89″E

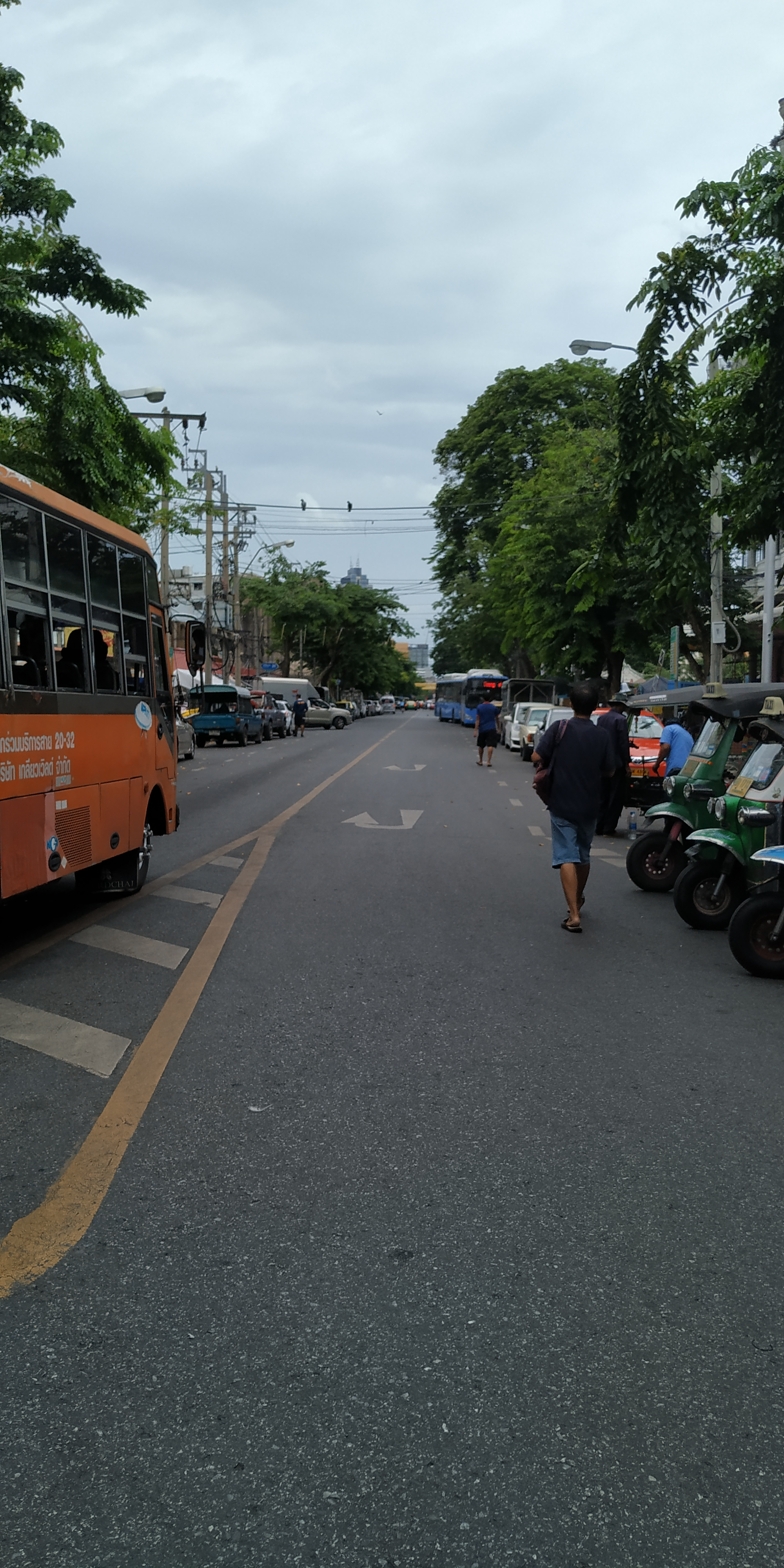
The end of Tha Din Daeng Road (Tha Din Daeng Pier is ahead)

Tha Din Daeng (Thai: ท่าดินแดง, pronounced [tʰâː dīn dɛ̄ːŋ]) is a market and one of the oldest neighbourhoods in Bangkok. It is in the Somdet Chao Phraya and Khlong San Subdistricts of Khlong San District on the Thonburi side (west bank of the Chao Phraya River)

== History ==
Tha Din Daeng dates back to the early Ayutthaya period (reigns of King Uthong to Intharacha). This area was a stop for cargo ships traveling from the Chao Phraya's mouth to Ayutthaya.

In the Rattanakosin period Tha Din Daeng was considered a prime location for commerce and industry. The area along the Chao Phraya, from Tha Din Daeng to the estuary, was home to many factories and businesses, such as rice mills, sawmills, warehouses, and docks. The traders in the area were mostly Chinese and Malays. King Mongkut (Rama IV) later encouraged European settlements.

Tha Din Daeng is home to many Thai Chinese, like other similar settlements such as Bangkok Chinatown, Yaowarat, Sampheng, Talat Noi, and Talat Phlu. Here there is a ferry that crosses from Rachawong pier (N5) in Sampheng. There are three shrines including Shiva Shrine, Sam Nai Keng Joss House (Chinese: 吞府三奶廟), the oldest Hakka's joss house in Bangkok, built in 1847, and Pung Tao Kong Joss House (本頭公廟).

For Sam Nai Keng, it has been a revered place for people of the Chinese origin in the area and nearby. It was originally located on the bank of the Chao Phraya River. When Tha Din Daeng Road was built, the joss house was moved to the current location. The yard behind the joss house was well-known for cloth dyeing by ebony. Later, indigo was used as dyeing.

Tha Din Daeng Road was built in 1931 during King Prajadhipok's (Rama VII) reign after the construction of Memorial bridge linked Phra Nakhon and Thonburi. The road was named by Prince Damrong to recall King Rama I's victories over the Burmese Army (Tha Din Daeng campaign).

Tha Din Daeng is home to many restaurants and street food vendors selling pork satay, pot-stewed goose and duck, milk café, bok kia (a kind of Hainan-style ice dessert), and Phra ram long song (พระรามลงสรง, rice topped with scalded pork and scalded water spinach and topped with satay sauce and nam phrik phao).

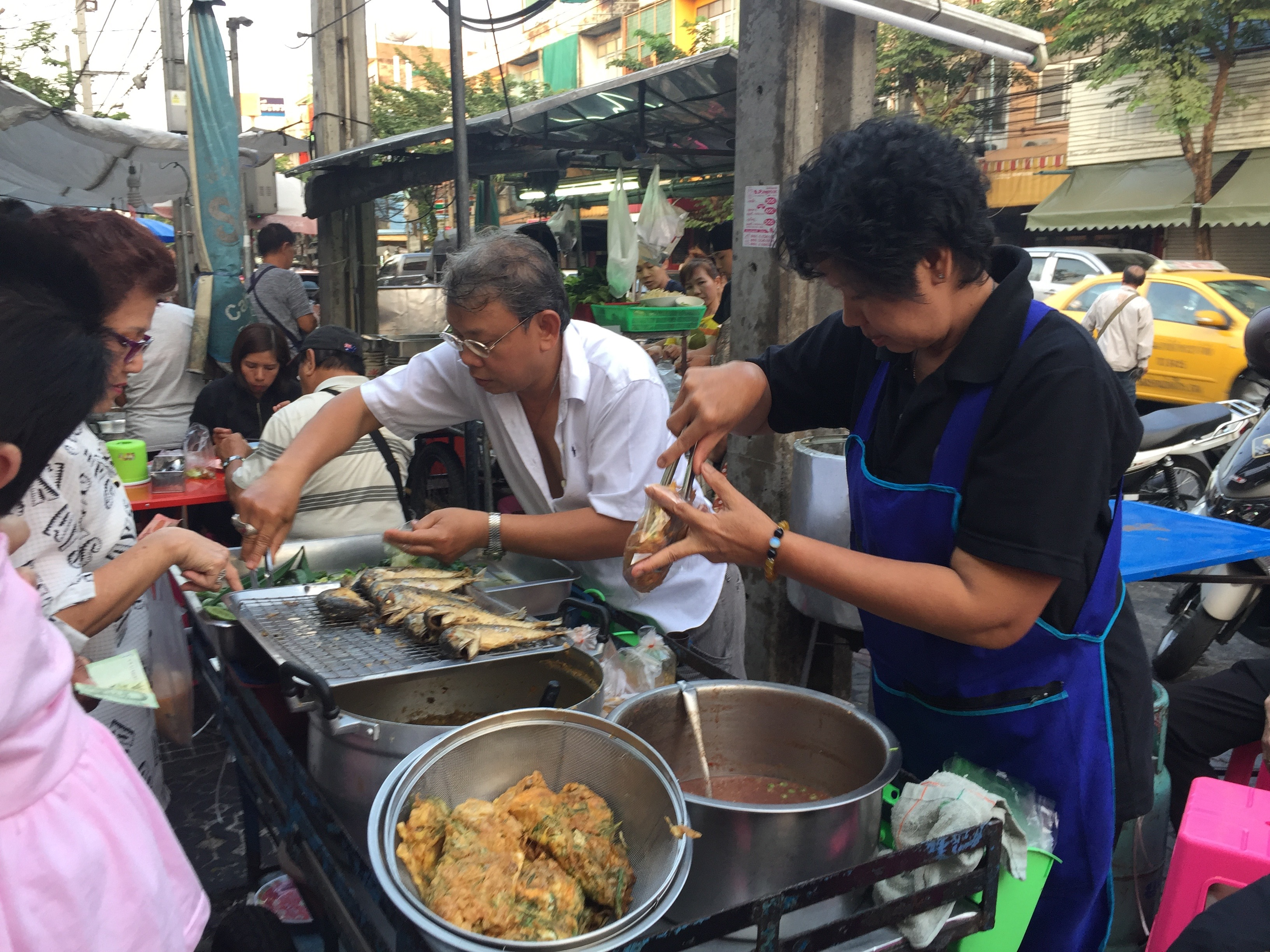
Food stall selling fried pla thu (short mackerel) and nam phrik kapi with many kinds of Thai food at Tha Din Daeng

== Places ==
- Somdet Chaopraya Institute of Psychiatry
- Tha Din Daeng Market
- Tha Din Daeng Pier
- Lat Ya Junction & The Royal Thai-Sikhism Arch (the beginning of Itsaraphap and Tha Din Daeng Roads)
