= Somsri Raksamran =

Thai chef and restaurateur in Mexico City

- Other name: Ana
- Occupations: Chef and restaurateur
- Years active: 2015–present
- Known for: Galanga Thai House, Kiin, Pin-tó, Somsaa
- Spouse: Eleazar Ángeles

Somsri Raksamran, who goes by Ana, is a Thai chef who lives in Mexico City. Together with her husband Eleazar Ángeles, she owns four Southeast Asian restaurants in the city: Galanga Thai House, Kiin Thai-Viet Eatery, Pin-tó and Somsaa. They also have a farm in Hidalgo where they grow produce for their kitchens. Galanga, the first of her restaurants, opened in 2015 in Colonia Roma and has had a Bib Gourmand since the guide's first Mexico edition in 2024.

== Biography ==
Somsri is from Takua Pa district in Phang Nga province, Thailand. Her family used to sell goods at markets and her mother used to run a street food stall. As a teenager she moved to Bangkok to study tourism. There, she took basic cooking classes, but she never trained as a chef per se. In 2006, she graduated from Suan Sunandha Rajabhat University with a bachelor's degree in tourism and hospitality. She worked at spas, hotels and resorts in Bangkok.

In 2010 she came to Mexico to work as a spa therapist at a hotel in the resort of Acapulco. There, she met Eleazar Ángeles, who was already in the restaurant business, while they both worked at a Banyan Tree hotel. They later got married in Thailand. After four years together, they moved to Mexico City and used all their savings to open Galanga.

Her sister, Rachadaporn Raksamran, who goes by "Pui", is the pastry chef at Somsaa.

== Restaurants ==
=== Galanga Thai House ===
Galanga opened in 2015 as Galanga Thai Kitchen, a small place at Guanajuato 202 in Roma Norte. It is named after galangal, a ginger-like root used in Thai curries and soups. In 2017 Animal Gourmet described Galanga as "always packed." By January 2020, the restaurant had moved to an old mansion at Monterrey 204. Most of the seating area is on the mansion's patio which has a retractable roof. The menu has dishes from across Thailand, including the northeast, the central plains and the south.

In 2024 it got a Bib Gourmand (an award for good value) in the first Mexico edition of the Michelin Guide, an honor it still holds as of 2026. In August 2024, Galanga hosted a summer menu by KinKan, a Thai-Japanese restaurant in Los Angeles, as part of a tour by its chef Nan Yimcharoen.

=== Kiin Thai-Viet Eatery ===
In 2018, the couple opened Kiin Thai-Viet Eatery in an old house at Orizaba 219, also in Roma Norte. In a 2020 interview, Somsri said that she had founded it with her sister Pui. Kiin means "eat" in Thai. It serves Thai and Vietnamese street food: charcoal-grilled skewers from a cart, pho, bún chả and bánh mì. The wine list, picked by Ángeles, is all organic or biodynamic. Some dishes are the same as at Galanga, e.g. green papaya salad and tom kha kai.

=== Pin-tó ===
Pin-tó Thai to Go started on July 25, 2020, during the COVID-19 pandemic, as a delivery-only business, i.e. a dark kitchen. Pintó is the Thai name for the stacked food container (a tiffin carrier) used to carry meals. The menu has pad thai, skewers, curries and khanom Tokyo, all dishes commonly sold as street food in Thailand. In 2022, Somsri took part in the Food & Wine Festival run by the Spanish-language edition of Food & Wine magazine. By January 2023 it also had a counter in the food hall of the Palacio de Hierro department store at the Mítikah shopping center.

=== Somsaa ===
Somsaa is in the old house next to Kiin at Orizaba 219; it was open by January 2023. It is a restaurant and tea house, and its full name is Somsaa Wine & Tea Room. Somsaa is a fruit similar to a sour orange. The menu has dishes from Malaysia, Indonesia, Singapore and Laos, and tea goes into sauces and cocktails. The only wines are sparkling. Time Out gave it five stars out of five. In February 2025, Somsri talked about Somsaa on Eddy Warman's show on the radio station 88.9 Noticias.

== Farm in Hidalgo ==
The couple has a farm in San Nicolás Atecoxco, in the municipality of San Agustín Metzquititlán, Hidalgo. They started it because many Thai herbs that they need at the restaurants are hard to get in Mexico. They grow galangal, kra chai (fingerroot), lemongrass, kaffir lime, four kinds of Thai basil, Thai chilies, bok choy and Thai eggplants, among others; the farm manager, Jesús Ángel Peñafiel, puts the total at 40 to 45 species. The soil at the farm had been worn out by agrochemicals so the first crops failed. But in 2025 it was farmed without pesticides, as an agroforestry system with fruit and timber trees. Winter frosts, down to −5 °C (23 °F), cut output by 60 to 70%.
