= Tha Din Daeng =

Tha Din Daeng (Thai: ท่าดินแดง) may refer to:

- Tha Din Daeng campaign, a short conflict in 1786
- Tha Din Daeng, Bangkok, a neighbourhood in Khlong San District, Bangkok, Thailand
- Tha Din Daeng subdistrict, Phak Hai district, Phra Nakhon Si Ayutthaya province, Thailand

== See also ==
- Din Daeng district, Bangkok, Thailand
