= La tiang =

Ancient Thai snack

- Type: Starter
- Course: Snack
- Place of origin: Thailand
- Region or state: Southeast Asia
- Main ingredients: Egg, pork, shrimp, roasted peanuts, shallot, pepper, garlic, coriander, red chili, fish sauce and coconut palm sugar

La tiang (Thai: ล่าเตียง, pronounced [lâː tīaŋ]) is an ancient Thai snack. It is most well known from the Kap He Chom Khrueang Khao Wan poem composed during the reign of King Rama I by the crown prince who later became King Rama II. It comprises shrimp, pork and peanuts minced together and wrapped in a thin mesh-like omelette casing making a square shape.

== Ingredients ==
La tiang has two parts: a mesh-shaped omelette wrapping and minced filling made from pork, shrimp, roasted peanuts, garlic, and coriander. It is seasoned with pepper, fish sauce, and coconut palm sugar.

== See also ==
- List of Thai dishes
