= Khao kan chin =

Thai rice dish

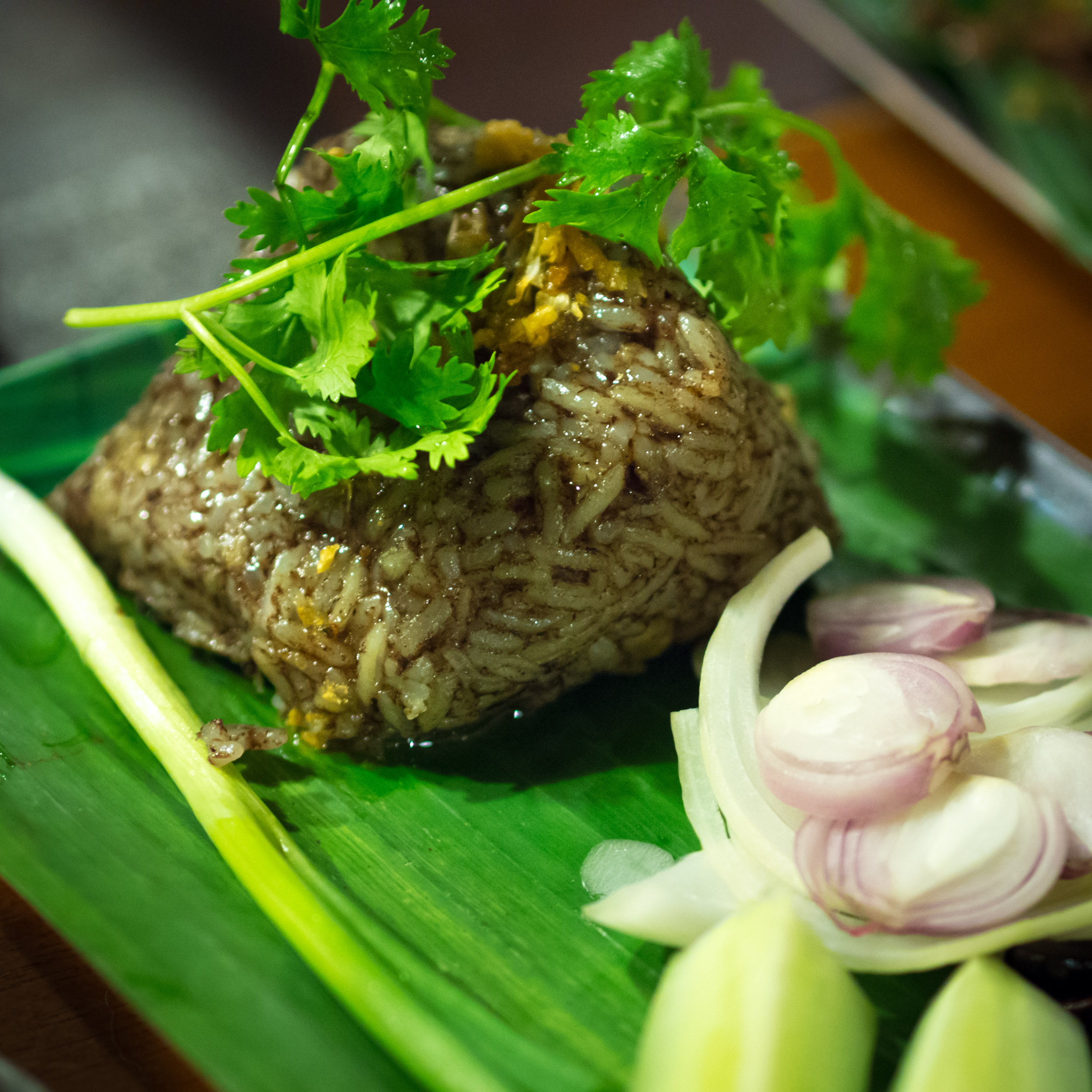
- Khao kan chin
- Alternative names: Khao ngiao, chin som ngiao
- Type: Steamed rice
- Place of origin: Northern Thailand (adapted from the original Tai Yai recipe)
- Serving temperature: Hot
- Main ingredients: Rice, pork, and pork blood

Khao kan chin (Thai: ข้าวกั๊นจิ๊น, pronounced [kʰâːw kán tɕín]), khao ngiao (ข้าวเงี้ยว), or chin som ngiao (Northern Thai: จิ๊นส้มเงี้ยว, pronounced [tɕín so᷇m ŋíaw]), also known as a steamed pudding with rice, is a dish from Northern Thailand. It is rice mixed with minced pork and pork blood, flavored with salt, sugar, a little garlic, shallot, vegetable oil, and then steamed inside a banana leaf. It is commonly served with fried chopped garlic, fried dried bird chilies, and cucumber.

== Etymology ==
In Northern Thailand, the word kan means 'squeeze' and chin means 'meat'. It is believed to be the origin of a dish name according to the cooking method.

== History ==
Khao kan chin was originally a dish from the Tai Yai ethnic group before spreading to the Lanna Kingdom or Northern Thailand. It is sometimes called khao ngiao because, in ancient times, Lanna ethnic people used to call them "Ngiao", which implied racism in terms of insincere and tricky people. Therefore, Tai Yai cultures in northern Thailand of Thailand use the word "ngiao" at the end of their names. Tai Yai was the only ethnic group that consumed rice, apart from other ethnic groups who preferred sticky rice for the main course. This has made Khao Kan Chin one of the few Lanna dishes that is made with rice.

== Preparation ==
Squeezing the pork with lemongrass leaves can improve the smell before mixing it with rice, minced pork, then adding salt and sugar. Now the puddling rice is ready to be steamed, putting the rice on prepared banana leaves, folding both ends to the middle tightly, and steaming it for half an hour.

== Side dishes ==
It can be served with fried chopped garlic, fried chopped shallot, fried dried bird chilies, onions, and cucumber. Also, it can be served as a side dish of nam ngiao.
