= Phat khing =

Thai stir fry chicken and vegetables

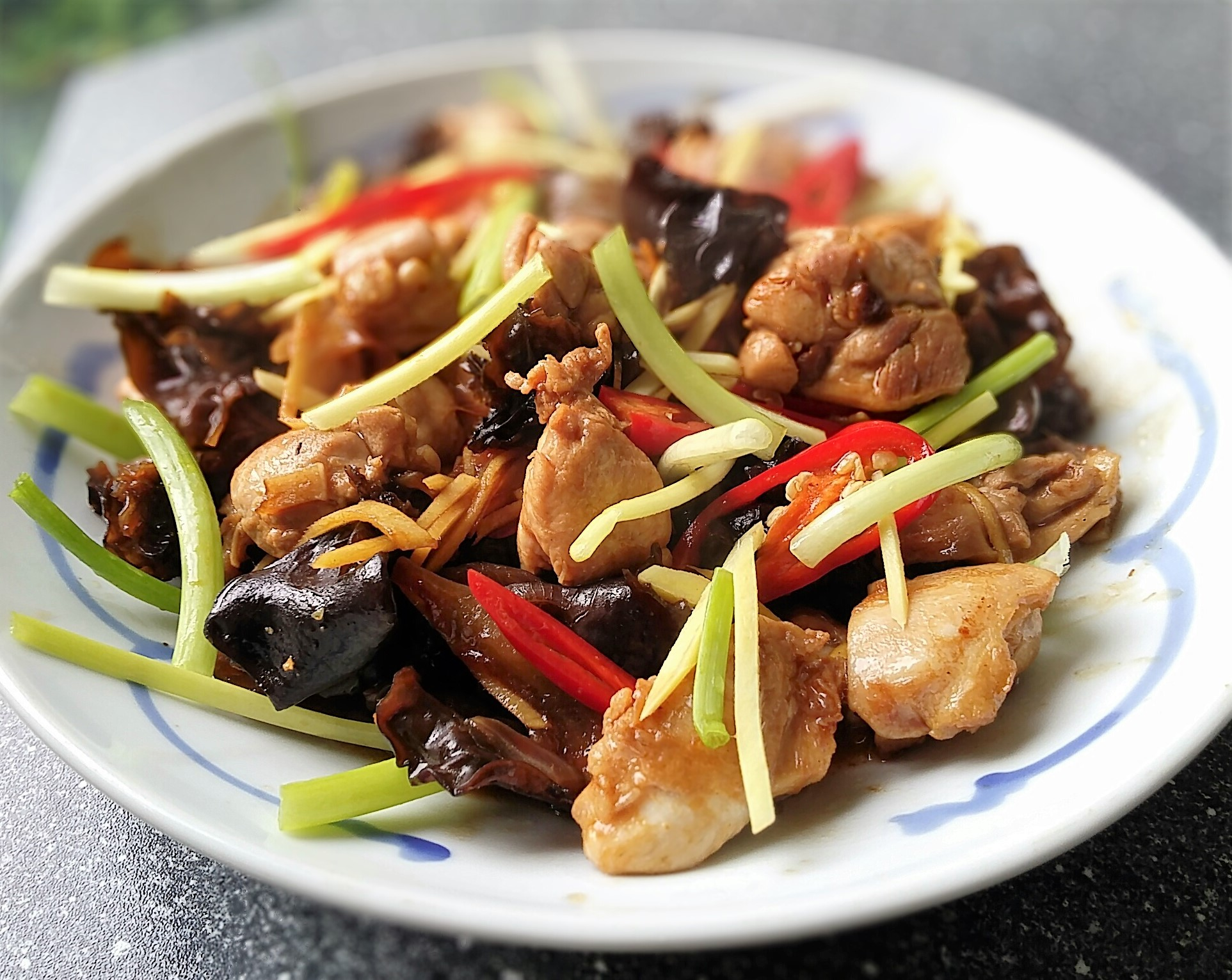
- Kai phat khing
- Place of origin: Mainland Southeast Asia
- Region or state: Southeast Asia
- Associated cuisine: Laos and Thailand

Phat khing (Thai: ผัดขิง, pronounced [pʰàt kʰǐŋ]; Lao: ຜັດຂີງ) is a Thai dish that is popular in Thailand and Laos.

Kai phat khing (ไก่ผัดขิง) contains stir-fried chicken and different vegetables like mushrooms and peppers, but other meats may be used. The defining ingredient is sliced ginger ("khing") which gives the dish a very characteristic taste. Other important ingredients in this dish are soy sauce and onion. It is served with rice. In both countries chicken gizzards is sometimes (partially) substituted for chicken.
