= Nam ngiao =

Food

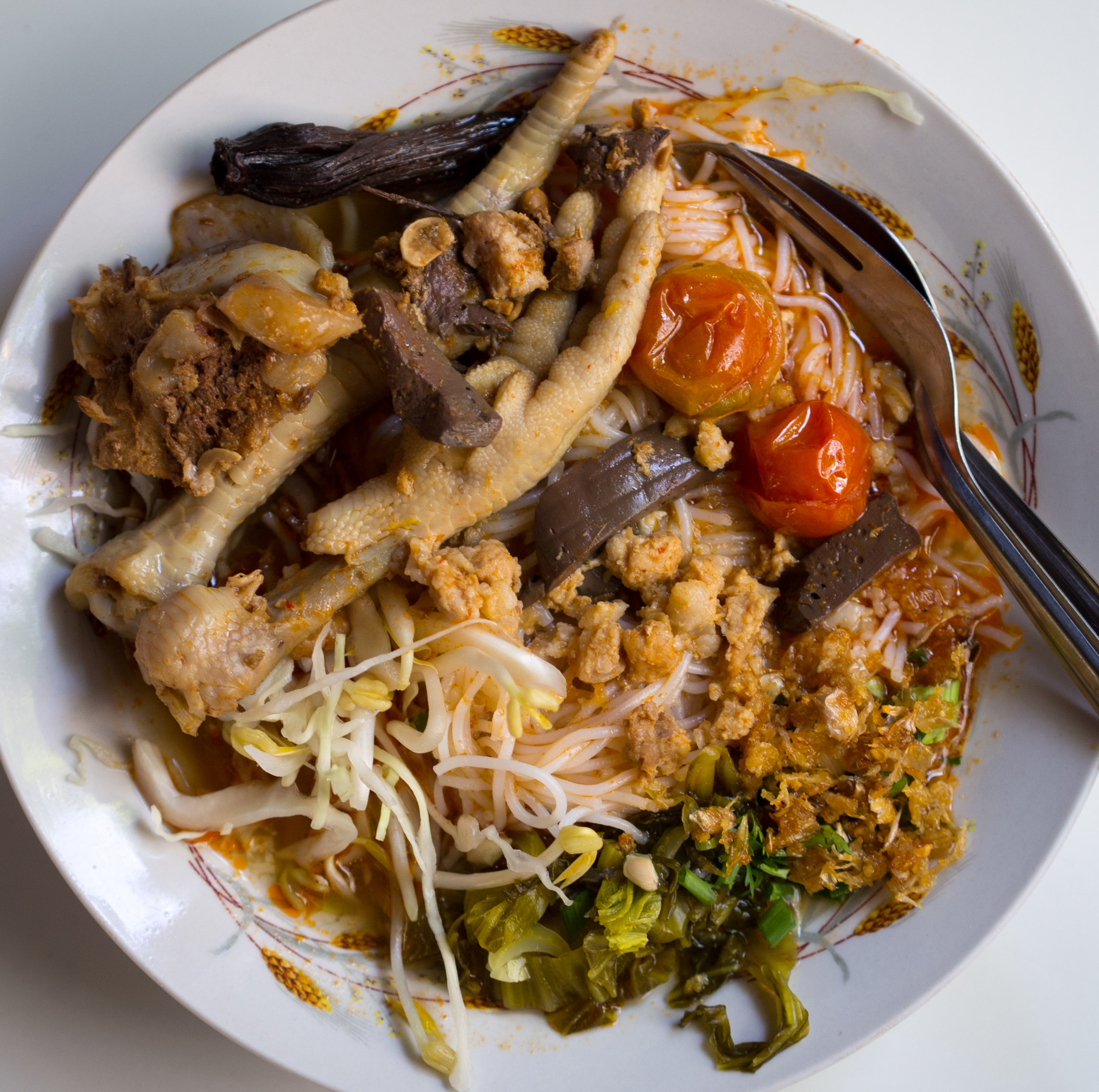
- Nam ngiao with khanom chin
- Alternative names: Nam ngeow
- Type: Noodle soup
- Place of origin: Shan State
- Region or state: Northern Thailand and Shan State
- Associated cuisine: Myanmar, Thailand and China
- Serving temperature: Hot
- Main ingredients: Noodles, beef or pork, tomatoes

Nam ngiao (Thai: น้ำเงี้ยว, pronounced [ná(ː)m ŋía̯w]) or nam ngio (Thai: น้ำงิ้ว, pronounced [ná(ː)m ŋíw]) is a noodle soup or curry of the cuisine of the Tai Yai people who live in the northeast of Myanmar, the southwest of Yunnan province, China, and in northern Thailand, mainly in Mae Hong Son Province. The dish has become famous in the northern Thai cuisine. Nam ngiao has a characteristic spicy and tangy flavor.

== Ingredients ==
This soup is made with noodles; the most commonly used type is khanom chin, fermented rice vermicelli, although kuaitiao or other noodles may be used. Beef or pork is another main ingredient, as well as diced curdled (chicken or pork) blood cake. Chopped tomatoes give the dish a certain sour flavor and crispy roasted or fried dry chilies and garlic are added for spiciness. Another important ingredient that gives the dish its characteristic flavor is thua nao, a type of fermented soy bean that is used extensively in northern Thai cuisine and for which shrimp paste is sometimes used as a substitute. Nam ngiao is often served along with pork rinds.

The name of the dish originates either from the Thai name of the Bombax ceiba (Thai: งิ้ว; ngio) of which the dried flower cores are an essential ingredient in the soup, or from ngiao, a derogatory term used in Northern Thailand for people of Shan descent.

Although originally a Shan dish, Nam ngiao is very popular among northern Thai people north of Phrae Province and is considered one of the auspicious dishes in Lanna tradition, being served at banquets and special occasions.

== Gallery ==
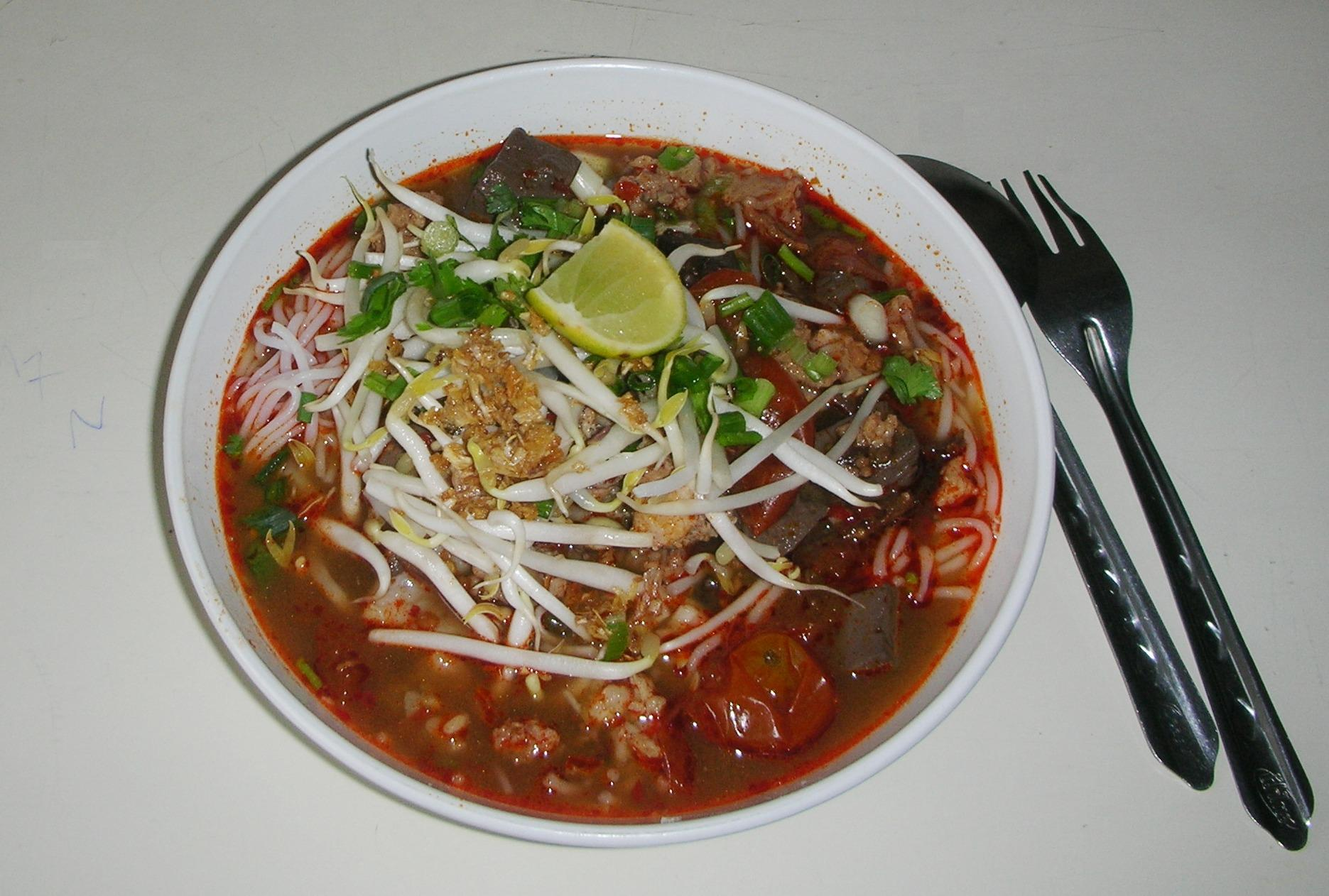
Nam ngiao in Chiang Rai city with a different type of noodle

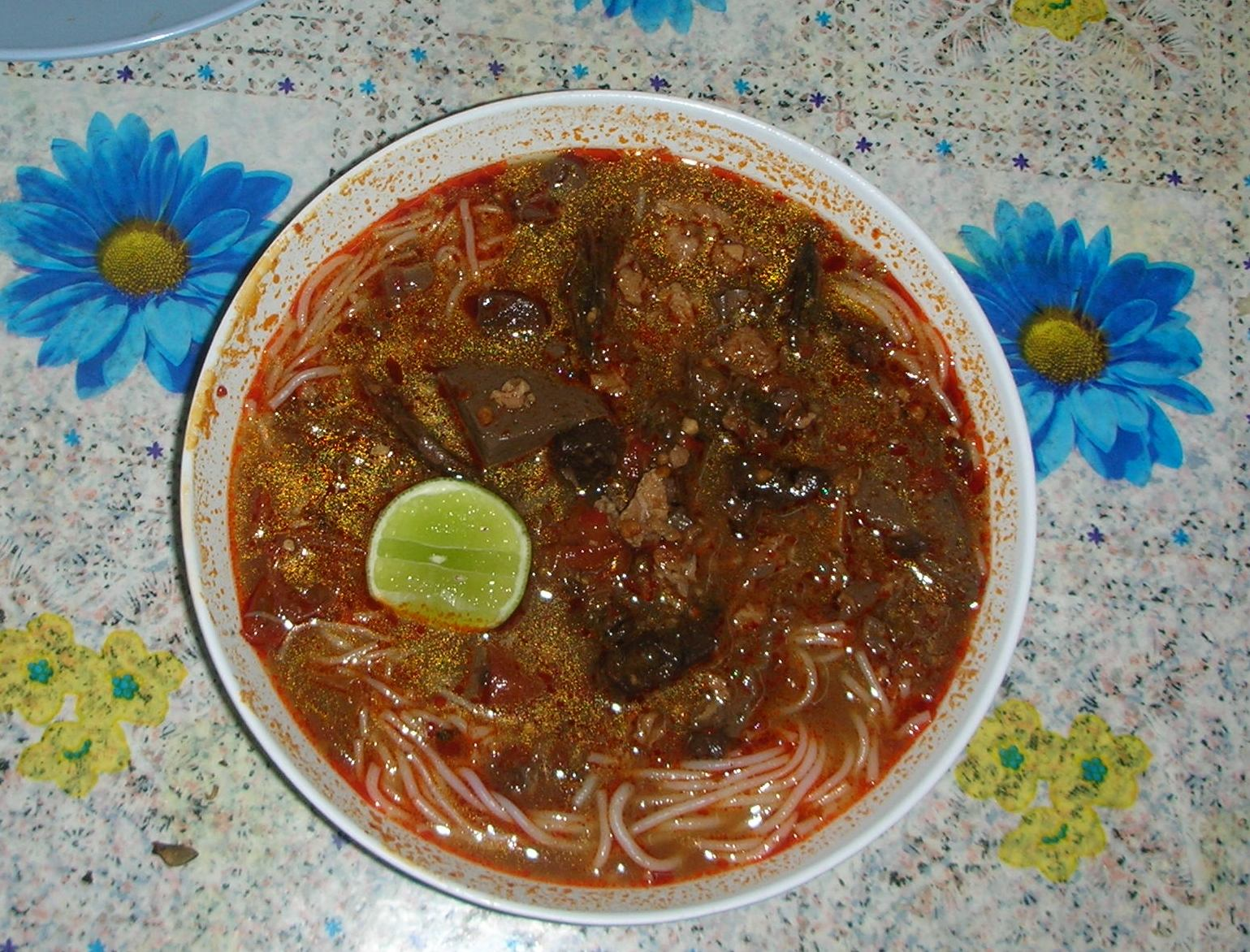
Nam ngiao

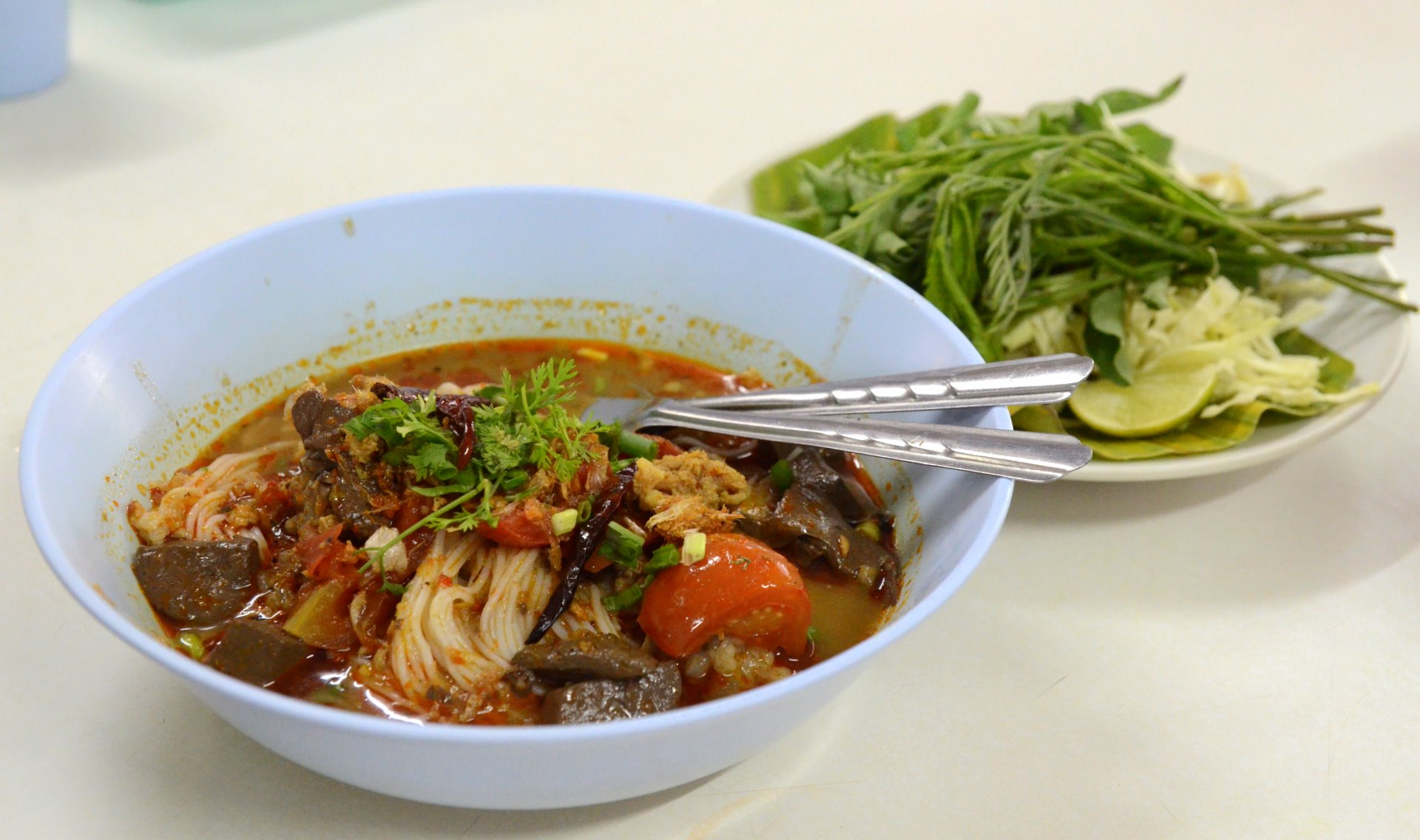
Khanom chin nam ngiao

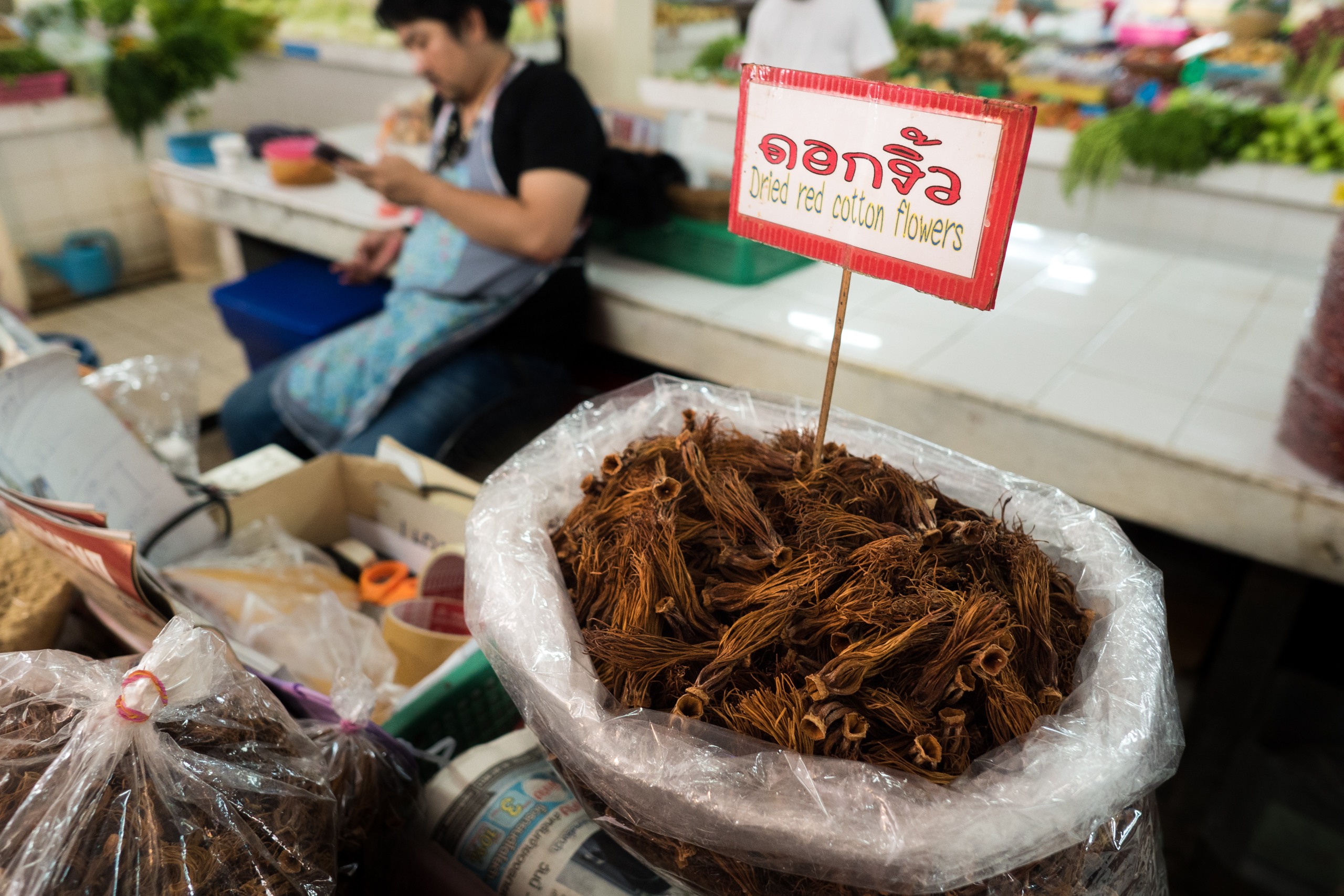
Dok ngio is an essential ingredient

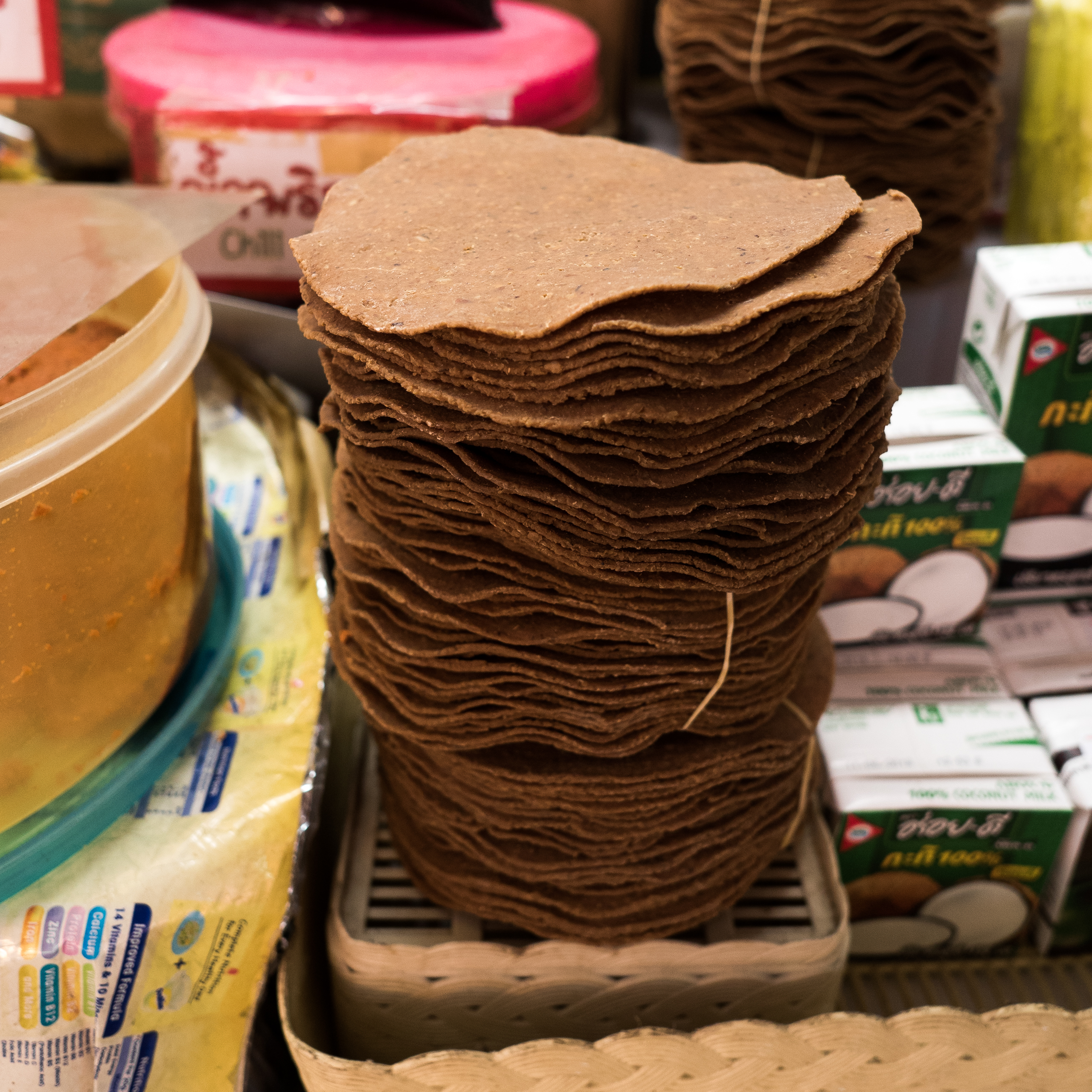
Tua nao in their characteristic disc shape

== See also ==
- Khao soi
- List of soups
- List of Thai dishes (Khanom chin nam ngiao)
