= Yam khanom chin =

Yam khanom chin (Thai: ยำขนมจีน, pronounced [jām kʰà.nǒm t͡ɕīːn]; also spelled Yum khanohm jeen) is a spicy and sour Thai dish made with khanom chin; thin rice noodles that and are most commonly eaten as part of the cuisines of East and Southeast Asia. Yam khanom chin consists of khanom chin, lime juice, ground chili, fish sauce, and sugar; fermented fish sauce may also be added. It speeds up metabolism as well as helping the excretory system. It is also a low-calorie food, with 220 calories per dish.

Literally, the name "yam khanom chin" is a derivative from two Thai words: "yam" refers to a Thai spicy and sour salad while "khanom chin" refers to thin rice noodles in Thai cuisine.

Common variants:

- Yum Khanom chin Pla thu, mixed Khanom chin, a short mackerel and sauce.
- Yum Khanom chin Ruam Mit, mixed Khanom chin, shrimps, squids, sauce, julienne onions and tomatoes.
- Yum Khanom chin Pla duk fu, mixed Khanom chin, deep-fried catfish meat and sauce.
