= Kung sarong =

Deep fried prawns wrapped in egg noodles

Kung sarong (Thai: กุ้งโสร่ง, pronounced [kûŋ sā.ròŋ]) is a Thai dish which contains deep fried prawns wrapped in egg noodles.

== Etymology ==
Kung means "prawns" (or shrimp) and sarong, loosely translates as "wrapped around something." In this context, note that a sarong is a cloth wrapped around the waist.

== Ingredients ==
In addition to eggs, rice vermicelli, and prawns, coriander, garlic, black pepper and salt are used according to taste.

== Serving ==
Kung sarong is usually eaten as appetizers with chili sauce or plum sauce.

== See also ==
- Kung hom pha
