= Nam phrik phao =

Thai spicy chili sauce

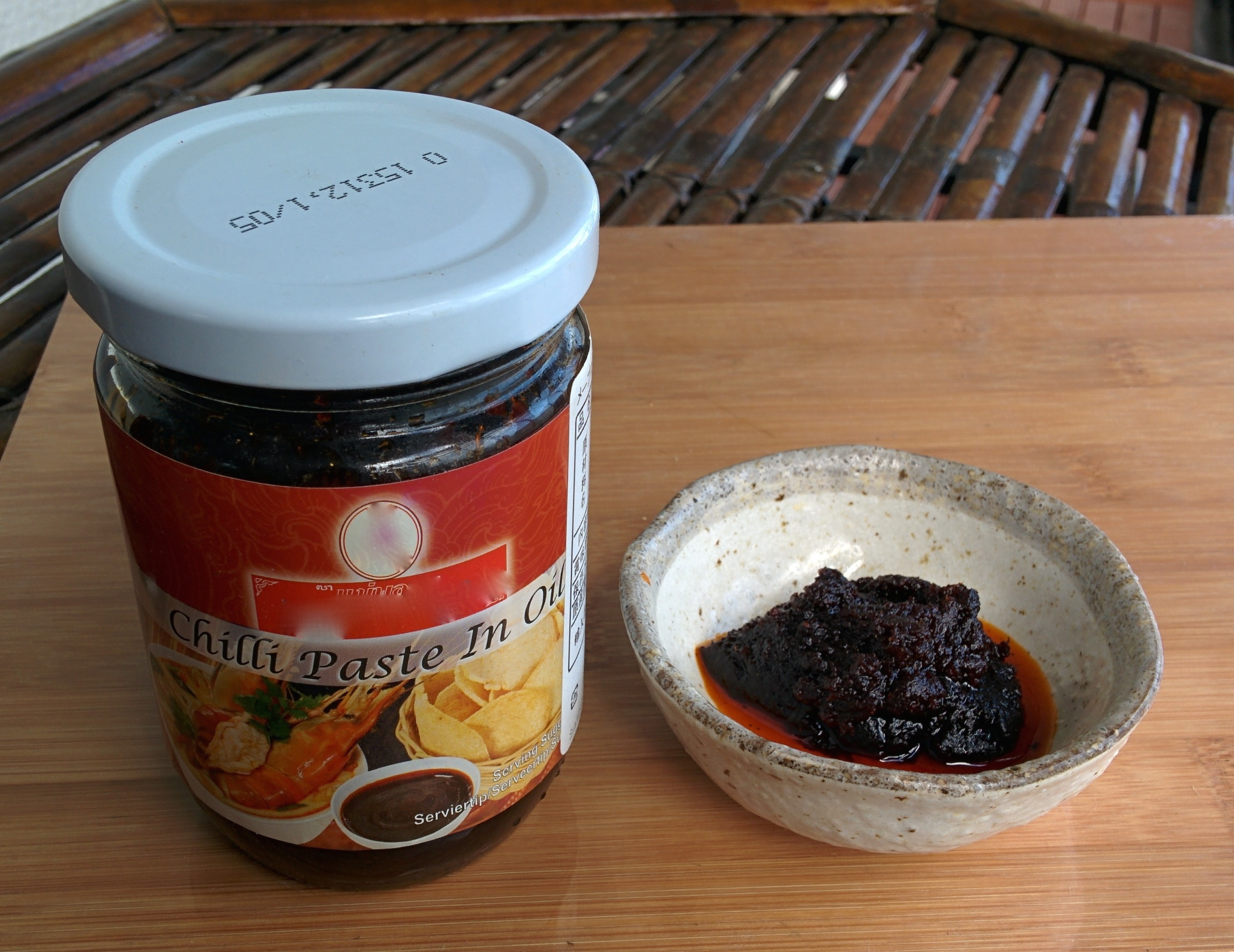
Nam phrik phao

Nam phrik phao (Thai: น้ำพริกเผา) is a type of Thai chili sauce known as nam phrik. It contains chili peppers, shallots, garlic, fermented shrimp, tamarind, fish sauce and palm sugar.

== See also ==
- Thai cuisine
