= Nam phrik kapi =

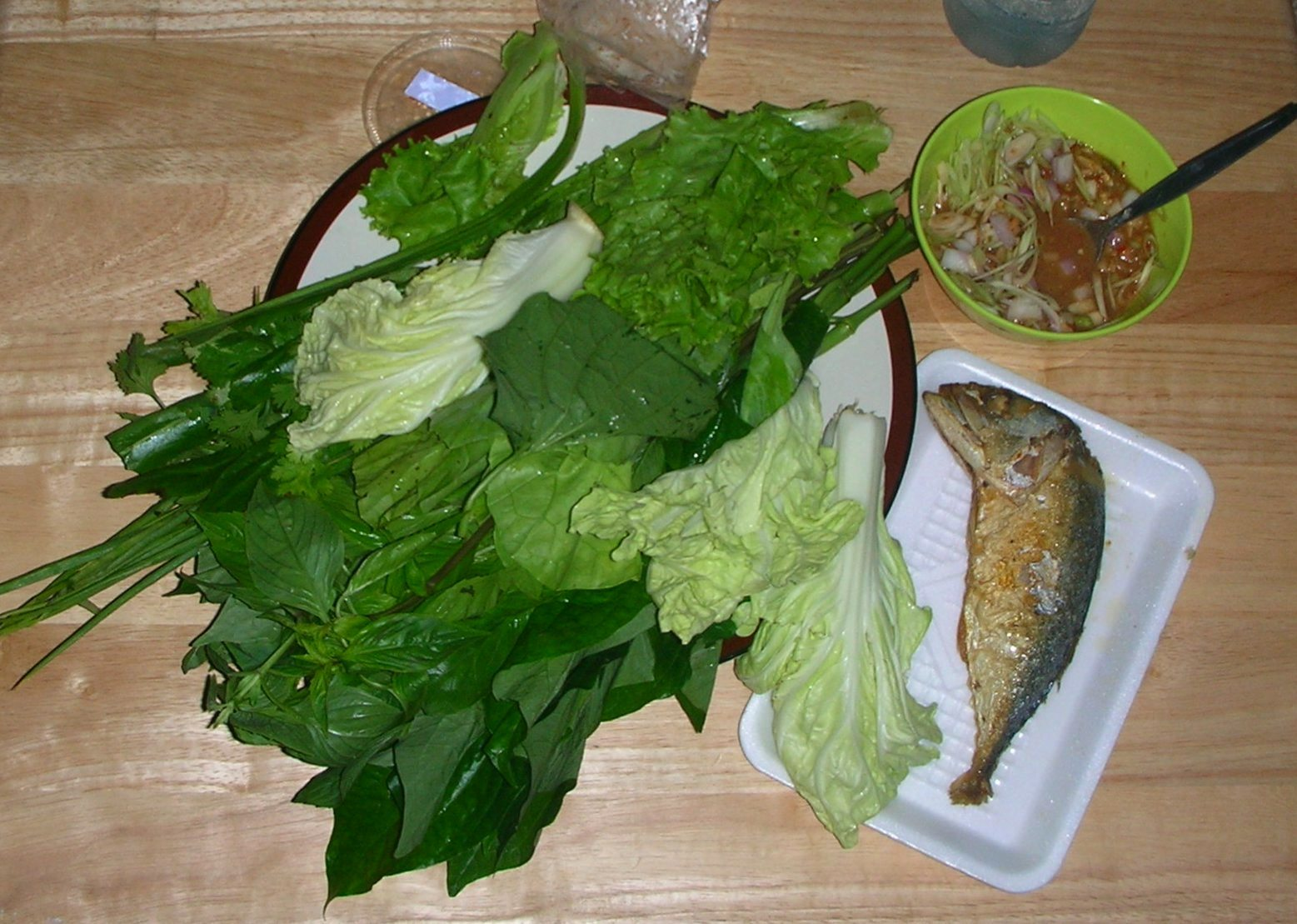
Nam phrik kapi and fried mackerel

Nam Phrik Kapi is a Thai chili shrimp paste (Thai:น้ำพริกกะปิ).

== See also ==
Shrimp paste
