= Khanom Tokyo =

Thai street food

Khanom Tokyo (lit: Tokyo Snack)
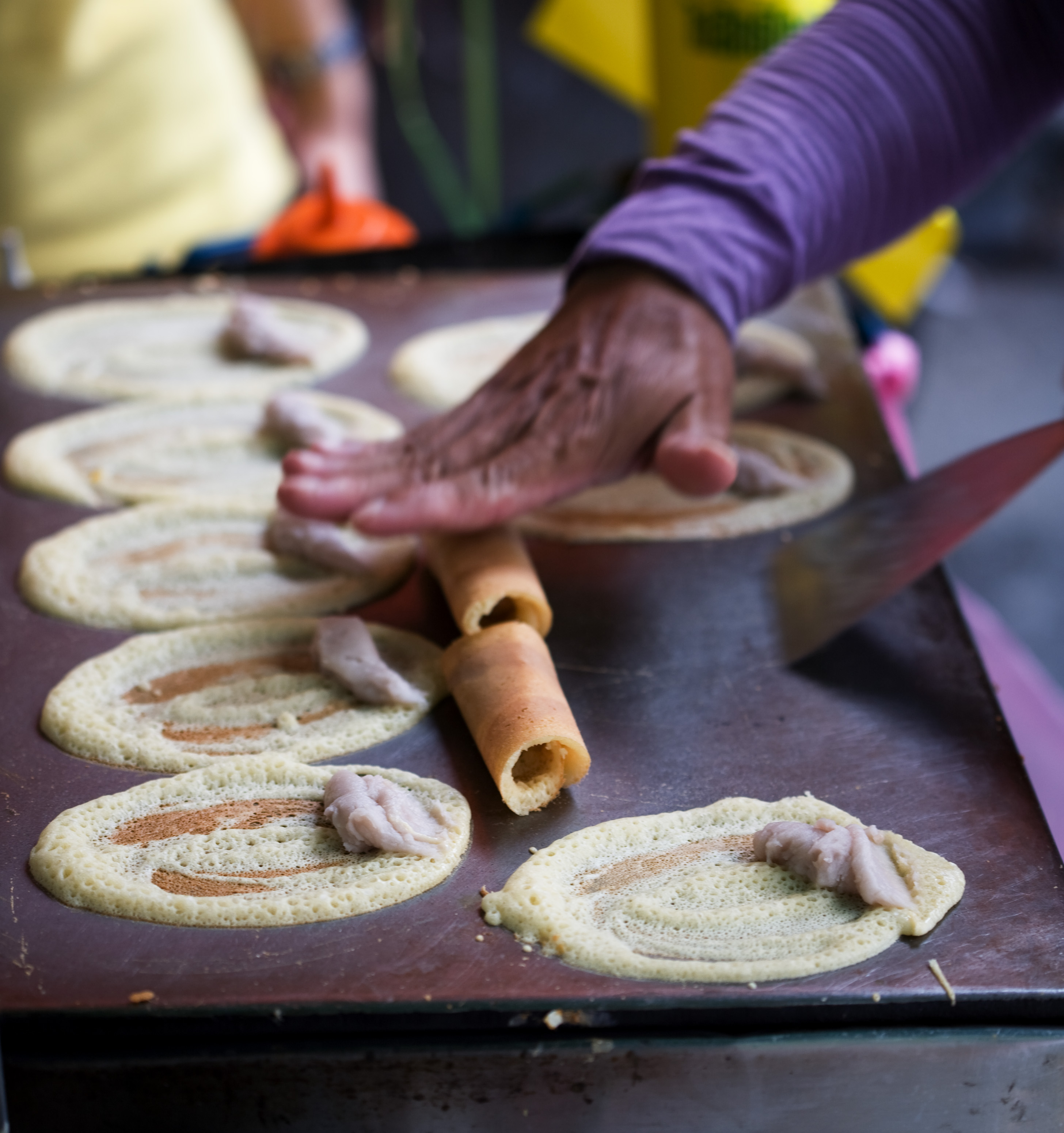
- Type: Snack, side dish, finger food
- Place of origin: Thailand
- Region or state: Southeast Asia
- Created by: Thai people
- Main ingredients: Eggs, wheat flour, sugar, fresh milk, and baking soda

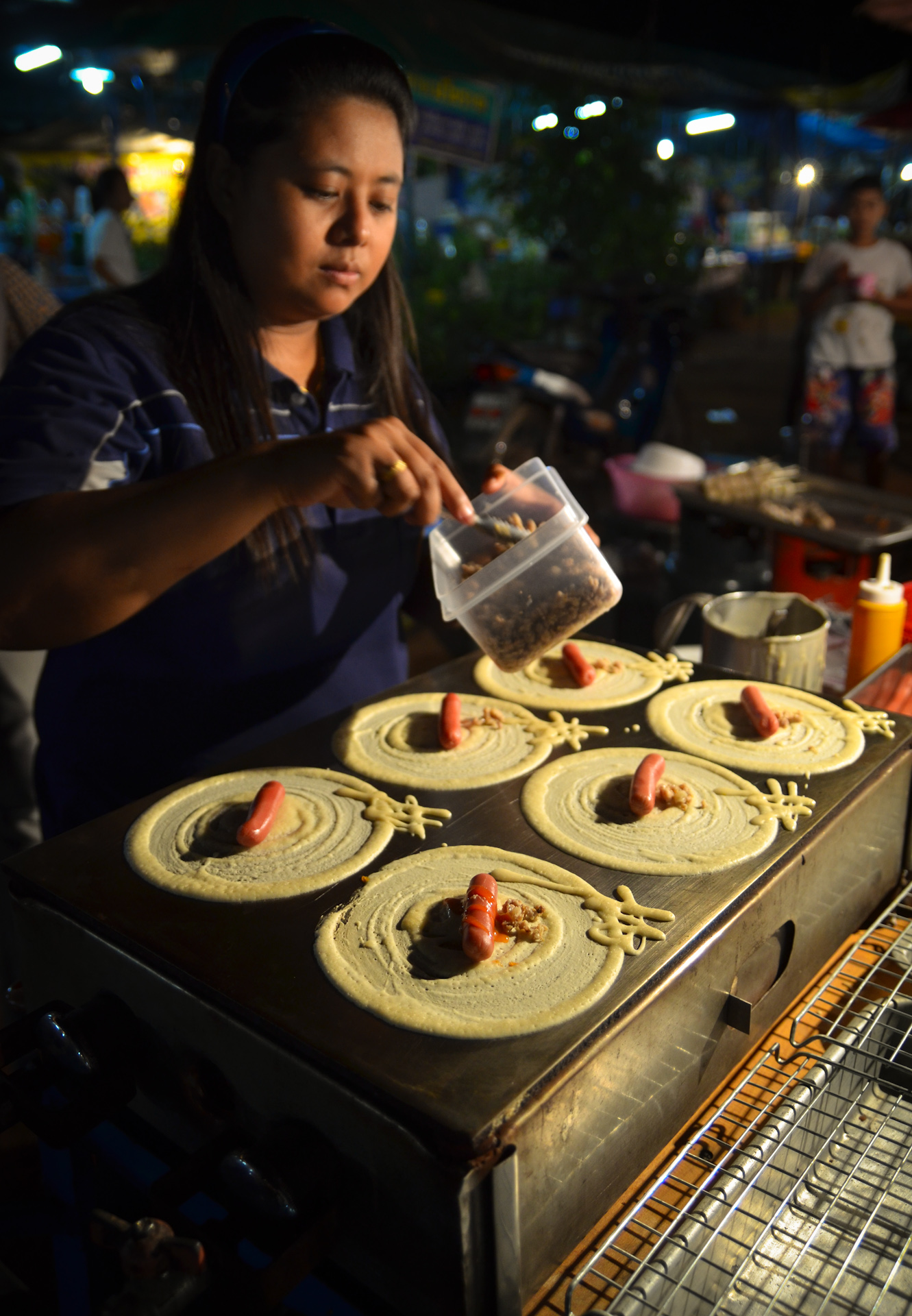
Khanom Tokyo with hot dogs during a fruit festival in Uttaradit, Thailand.

Khanom Tokyo or Khanom Tokiao (Thai: ขนมโตเกียว, RTGS: khanom tokiao, pronounced [kʰā.nǒm tōː.kīa̯w]) is a Thai street snack. It is a thin, flat pancake filled with sweet custard cream. Some have a savory filling, like pork or sausage.

== History ==
The snack is believed to have been sold for the first time in 1967 at a Japanese department store in Bangkok, named Thai-Daimaru (タイ大丸), and is said to be a Thai adaptation of the Japanese dorayaki. There is also a Japanese dessert with red bean filling that looking exactly the same as Khanom Tokyo called "Anmaki" (あんまき). Which is a confectionery speciality from Chiryu City, Aichi prefecture, made by rolling red bean paste (anko) in a thinly baked dough. Kanazawa also have similar confectionery, called "Komo-Kaburi" (薦被), which made with red bean paste, chestnut and wrap with seaweed.

The snack can have either sweet or savory fillings. In the Thai language, khanom means "confectionery", "dessert", "sweet" or "snack". The name Tokyo is taken from the capital of Japan. Although the name of this snack suggests a Japanese origin, in reality it is a Thai invention, or at least inspired by anmaki from Aichi Prefecture, albeit with Thai style fillings.

== Ingredients ==
The batter is made from egg, wheat flour, sugar, fresh milk, and baking soda. The fillings are usually sweet, for example, vanilla cream, taro, pandan cream, various fruit jams, shredded coconut, or cocoa powder. Often fillings are somewhat sweet, but always mixed with something salty, such as quail eggs or small sausages.
