= Portugal–Thailand relations =

- Portugal: Thailand

Diplomatic mission
- Embassy of Portugal, Bangkok: Royal Thai Embassy, Lisbon

Envoy
- Ambassador Francisco Vaz Patto: Ambassador Krongkanit Rakcharoen

Relations between Portugal and Thailand date as far as the 16th century. Portugal was the first European nation to make contact with the Ayutthaya Kingdom, in 1511. The Portuguese became dominant foreign traders, and established a presence in the capital. Portuguese traders introduced firearms as well as New-World goods from the Columbian Exchange, influencing Thai cuisine, language and culture. Although Portugal's overseas influence gradually declined from the 17th century, it maintained ties with Siam. The Portuguese Embassy in Bangkok, established in 1820, is the oldest diplomatic mission in the country. In contrast to other European powers, against whose colonial aspirations Siam struggled during the 19th century, Siam's relationship with Portugal was largely friendly. Both countries elevated their missions to embassy status in 1964, and Thailand established a resident embassy in Lisbon in 1981. Today, the two countries share a small amount of trade, tourism and cultural activities.

== History ==
=== Establishment of friendly relations ===
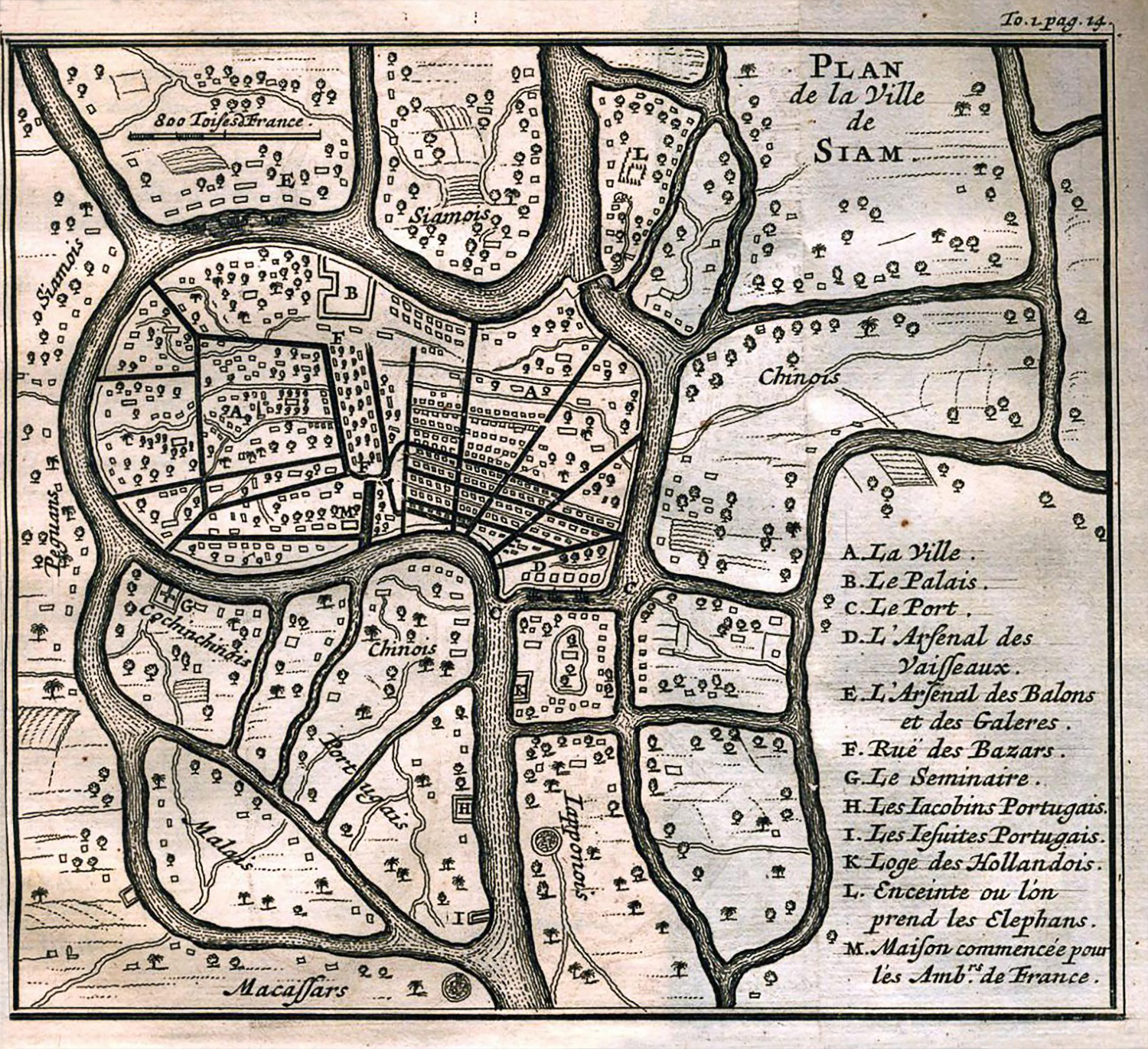
The Portuguese quarter in Ayutthaya is at the bottom left ("Portugais") of the map, 1691

In 1498, Portuguese explorer Vasco da Gama became the first European to reach India by sea, enabling the Portuguese to establish holdings across Asia. The first written mention of Siam by the Portuguese was written by Rui de Araújo to Afonso de Albuquerque in 1510. In 1511, Afonso de Albuquerque led the Portuguese capture of Malacca. While they were still assaulting the city, Albuquerque had sent in July Duarte Fernandes as an envoy to the Ayutthaya Kingdom. Arriving in October to Siam along with two Chinese captains, he became the first Portuguese to arrive in the country. His mission to the court of King Ramathibodi II was successful, and Fernandes returned with several gifts and letters from Ramathibodi II addressed to Albuquerque and King Manuel I of Portugal. The Portuguese then sent two other envoys, one led by Antonio Miranda de Azevedo in 1512 and another in 1516 led by Duarte de Coelho. Coelho's mission promised to supply guns and ammunition to the Siamese in exchange for Portugal being allowed to establish settlements in Siam, engage with them in trade, and freely practice Christianity. Coelho's mission also highlighted the desire for Siamese traders to replace Arab traders who had left Malacca following its capture by Portugal. In 1518, Portugal and Siam signed a Treaty of Friendship and Commerce.

There were also Portuguese trade representatives in Ligor and Pattani appointed to oversee trade in benzoin, indigo, ivory, lac, rice, tin, and sappan wood. In 1538 during the reign of King Chairacha 120 Portuguese soldiers marched with the King on campaign against his enemies and were rewarded commercial privileges and living quarters in Ayutthaya, establishing Campos Portugues. Subsequently, in the 16th century, around 300 Portuguese settled around Ayutthaya, with some as traders and others as soldiers. By 1767, Campos Portugues' population grew to over 3,000. During the 1547-1549 Burmese–Siamese War, Portuguese mercenaries fought for both Burma and Siam, with notable mercenaries fighting for Siam including Galeote Pereira. Siam again enlisted Portuguese mercenaries to defend Tavoy and Tenasserim in 1613 and 1614 during the 1609-1622 Burmese-Siamese War.

In 1545, Fernão Mendes Pinto began exploring parts of Siam, where he became the first European to described Phuket in detail, which was called then by Westerners as 'Junk Ceylon'. Pinto then returned to Siam for a second trip in 1554, where he described Ayutthaya as being like Venice as "one travels more by water than one does by land." The first Roman Catholic missionaries to Siam were Portuguese chaplains Friar Jeronimo da Cruz and Sebastiâo da Canto of the Dominican Order, who established a parish in Ayutthaya before Jeronimo da Cruz was killed in the Burmese Siege of Ayutthaya in 1569. The first Portuguese Jesuit missionary to Ayutthaya was led by Balthasar Sequeira around 1606. Also in 1606, a Siamese embassy was sent to the Portuguese Viceroy in Goa.

=== Competition over Siamese trade with the Dutch ===
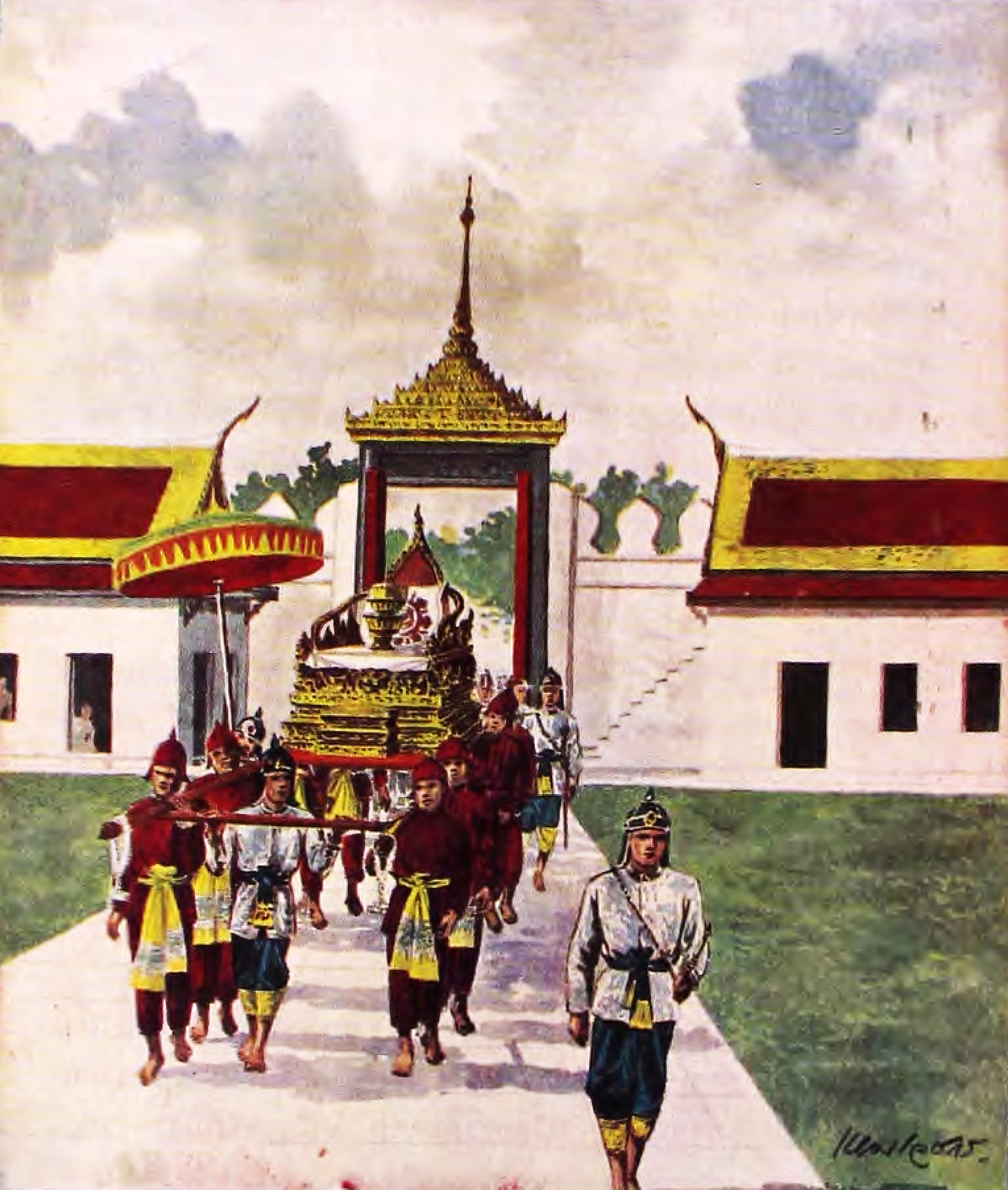
A procession taking a royal letter from Portugal into the Grand Palace in Bangkok, 1786/87

During the 17th century, Portuguese dominance over trade in Southeast Asia was being challenged by the Dutch. Prior to this, the Portuguese were very favoured by the Siamese court and dominated trade with little competition. However, official relations between the Netherlands and Siam began in 1604, and through the reign of King Ekathotsarot, Portuguese influence in Siam was undermined by the Dutch. This was not exclusive to Siam, as the Portuguese Empire when it was part of the Iberian Union from 1580 to 1640 faced issues with the Dutch, particularly in the Dutch–Portuguese War from 1598 to 1663.

The 17th century also saw hostilities between the Portuguese and Siamese. In 1624, the Portuguese captured a Dutch ship in Siamese waters, causing King Songtham to force the Portuguese to release it. In 1628, the Portuguese sunk a Siamese junk. By the end of Songtham's reign, the Portuguese were seen distrustful. When Prasat Thong usurped the throne in 1629, he imprisoned almost all Portuguese in Siam for three years. In July 1633, Sebastian Moutos d’Avilla was sent by the Portuguese in Malacca to request the release of Portuguese prisoners. Prasat Thong accepted this request, but Sebastian Moutos d’Avilla decided to escape with the prisoners in September. Although isolated, Prasat Thong maintained friendly relations with the Dutch who promised to assist him against the Portuguese and Cambodians.

Despite sour relations in the first half of the 17th century, relations improved during the reign of King Narai. In 1674, he allowed the Portuguese to build a church in modern-day Bangkok which became the Immaculate Conception Church, Thailand's oldest Catholic church. In 1685, Portuguese embassy led by Pero Vaz de Siqueira arrived in Siam from Goa, with the goal of gaining extraterritoriality for Portuguese subjects in Siam and settling disputes with French missionaries of the Paris Foreign Missions Society. It failed to achieve both goals, but Narai had sent his own mission to Portugal prior to Siqueira's arrival. The Siamese mission to Portugal however only managed to reach the Dutch Cape Colony after being stuck in Goa for a year and getting shipwrecked off Cape Agulhas in early 1686.

=== Modern-relations ===
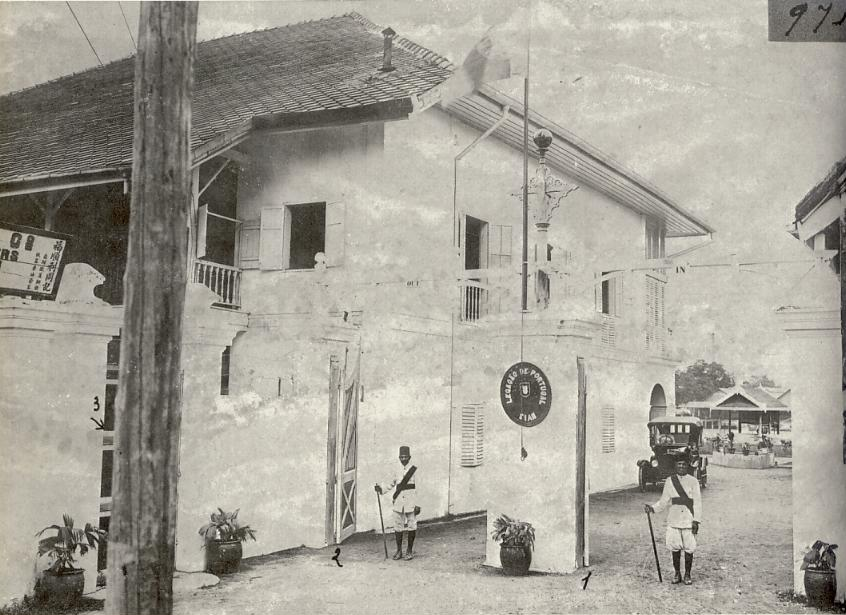
Gates to the Portuguese embassy in 1918

Following the fall of Ayutthaya and the establishment of the Chakri dynasty in 1782, the Portuguese were the first Europeans to re-establish relations with Siam, offering guns and ammunition. In 1786, Rama I sent a request of 3,000 muskets to the Portuguese government in Goa, and granted the Portuguese land on the Chao Phraya's river in Bangkok called 'the Rosary'. As the community at Campos Portugues was destroyed by the Burmese during the 1765-1767 Burmese-Siamese War, the Portuguese diaspora in Siam relocated around three areas: Samsen, Kudi Chin and the Rosary (Talat Noi). The land at Kudi Chin had been granted to the Portuguese by King Taksin in 1770.

In 1818, Portuguese envoy Carlos Manuel Silveira arrived in Bangkok from Macao where he concluded a commercial agreement between Siam and Portugal. He subsequently became the first resident Portuguese consul in Siam. In 1820, a Treaty of Peace, Friendship and Trade between Portugal and Siam was signed. Also during 1820, Rama II granted land near the Rosary to the Portuguese to build a factory and the residence for Silveira. In 1860, the Embassy of Portugal was constructed on the same land, becoming the oldest embassy of a European nation in Thailand.

Modern treaties signed between Portugal and Thailand include the Treaty of Friendship, Commerce and Navigation signed in Bangkok on 10 February 1869 and negotiated by Isidoro Francisco Guimarães, the Convention for the regulation of the import and sale of spirituous beverages in Siam signed in Lisbon on 14 May 1883, a Treaty of Friendship, Commerce and Navigation signed in Lisbon on 14 August 1925 and again on 21 July 1938, a cultural agreement and a treaty of cooperation in the execution of penal sentences signed in Lisbon on 1 April 1985, an agreement for cooperation in the field of tourism signed in Bangkok on 9 March 1989, an agreement for scientific and technological cooperation signed in Bangkok on 9 March 1989, and an agreement for scientific and technological cooperation signed in Bangkok on 22 August 2001.

== Economy and trade ==
According to The Observatory of Economic Complexity, both nation's top 5 exports to each other in 2022 are listed below:

Portugal's top exports to Thailand

- Motor vehicles; parts and accessories - $10.1 million
- Cellulose fiber papers - $5.69 million
- Animal meal and pellets - $2.75 million
- Air pumps - $2.24 million
- Tin ore - $2.02 million

Thailand's top exports to Portugal

- Air pumps - $23.6 million
- Printed circuit boards - $20.7 million
- Rubber tires - $20.2 million
- Ethylene polymers - $13.9 million
- Integrated circuits - $12.3 million

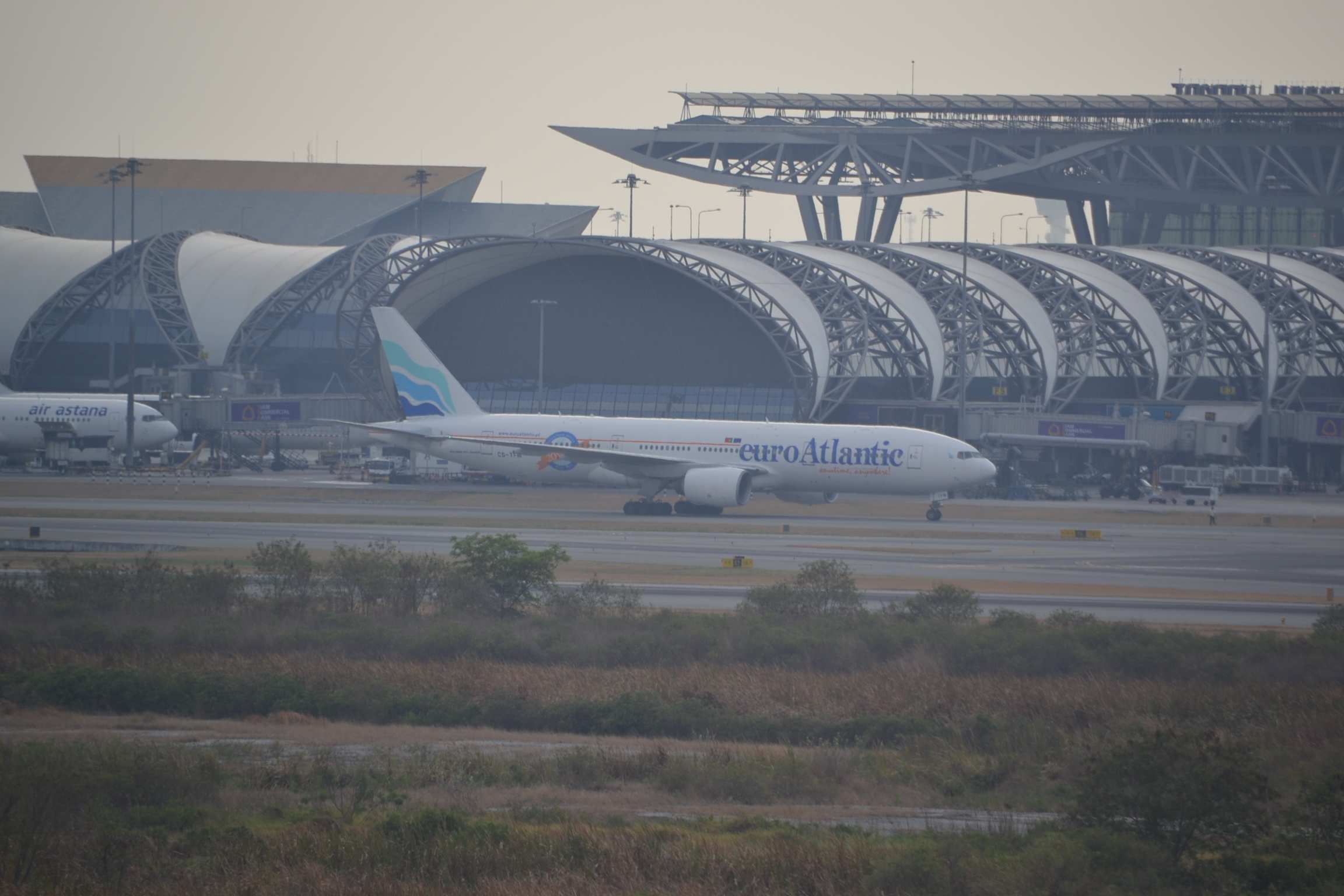
Portuguese airline, EuroAtlantic Airways, at Suvarnabhumi Airport - 2014

In 2015, around 250 companies exported goods from Portugal to Thailand.

=== Tourism ===
In 2015, around 30,000 Portuguese tourists visited Thailand, growing to 52,000 before the COVID-19 pandemic in 2019. The pandemic and its effects saw this drop to 42,000 Portuguese tourists visiting in 2023. Between January and April 2024, the number of Portuguese tourists visiting Thailand surged 44% from 2023 numbers, a greater growth than most European countries. Portugal was among the 93 countries granted a 60-day visa-free entry by Prime Minister Srettha Thavisin in July 2024.

The number of Thai tourists visiting Portugal is smaller, with 10,000 visiting Portugal in 2015.

== Diplomatic missions ==
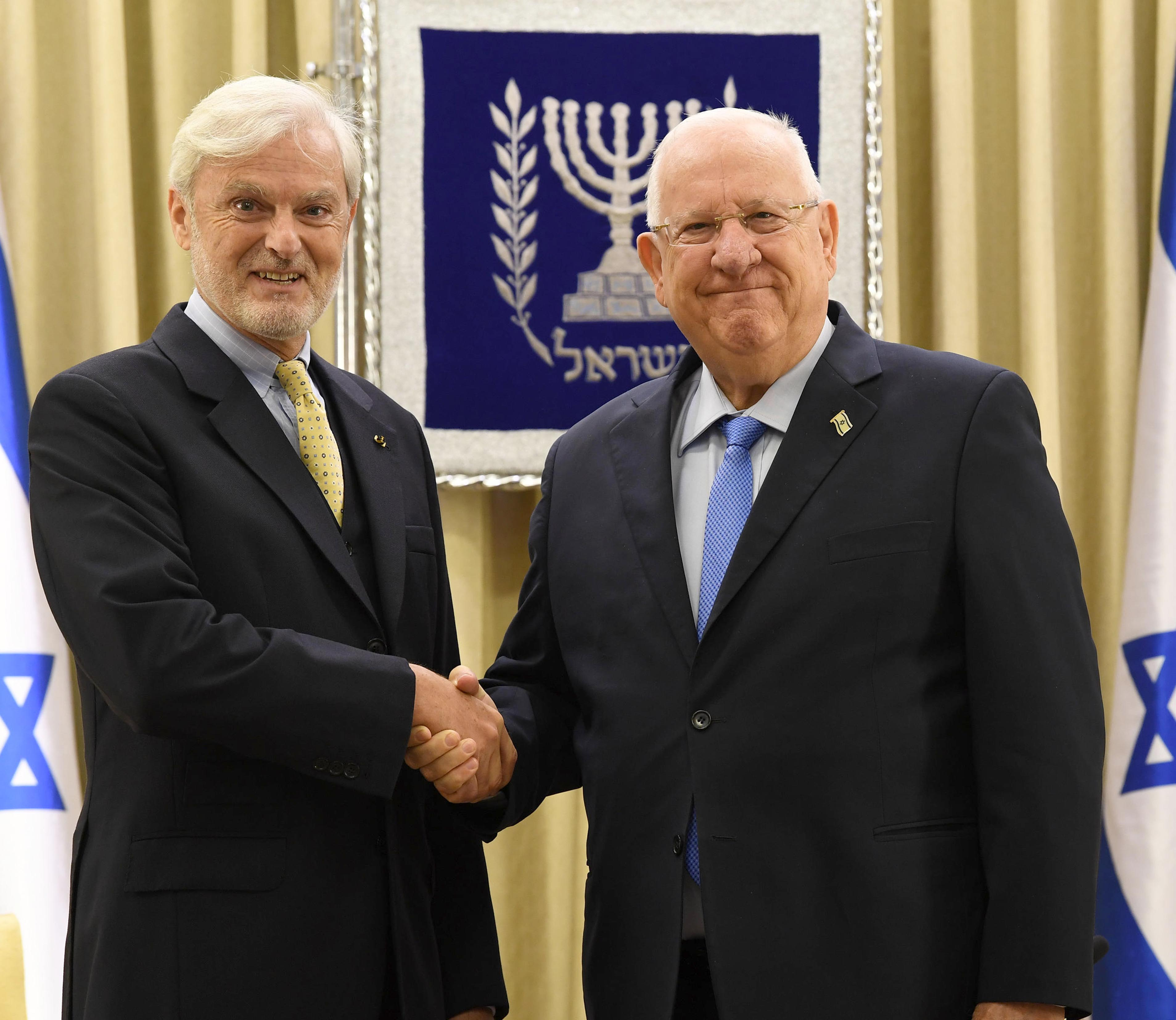
Weinstein (left) when he was previously the Portuguese ambassador to Israel in 2017

The Embassy of Portugal in Bangkok is located along Captain Bush Lane overlooking the Chao Phraya river. First established in 1820 as a consulate, it is the oldest diplomatic mission of a European nation in Thailand. The consulate was headed by Portugal's first permanent envoy to Siam, Carlos Manuel Silveira. Construction on the modern embassy began in 1860 and finished in 1875.

The current ambassador of Portugal to Thailand has been João Bernardo de Oliveira Martins Weinstein since January 2021, receiving his credentials from King Vajiralongkorn in April 2021. Weinstein had previously served as Portugal's ambassador to Romania, Moldova (non-resident), and Israel. As ambassador to Thailand, he is also accredited to Cambodia, Laos, Malaysia and Vietnam.

Thailand established a resident embassy in Lisbon in 1981. The current Thai ambassador to Portugal is Krongkanit Rakcharoen.

== Culture ==
=== Architecture ===
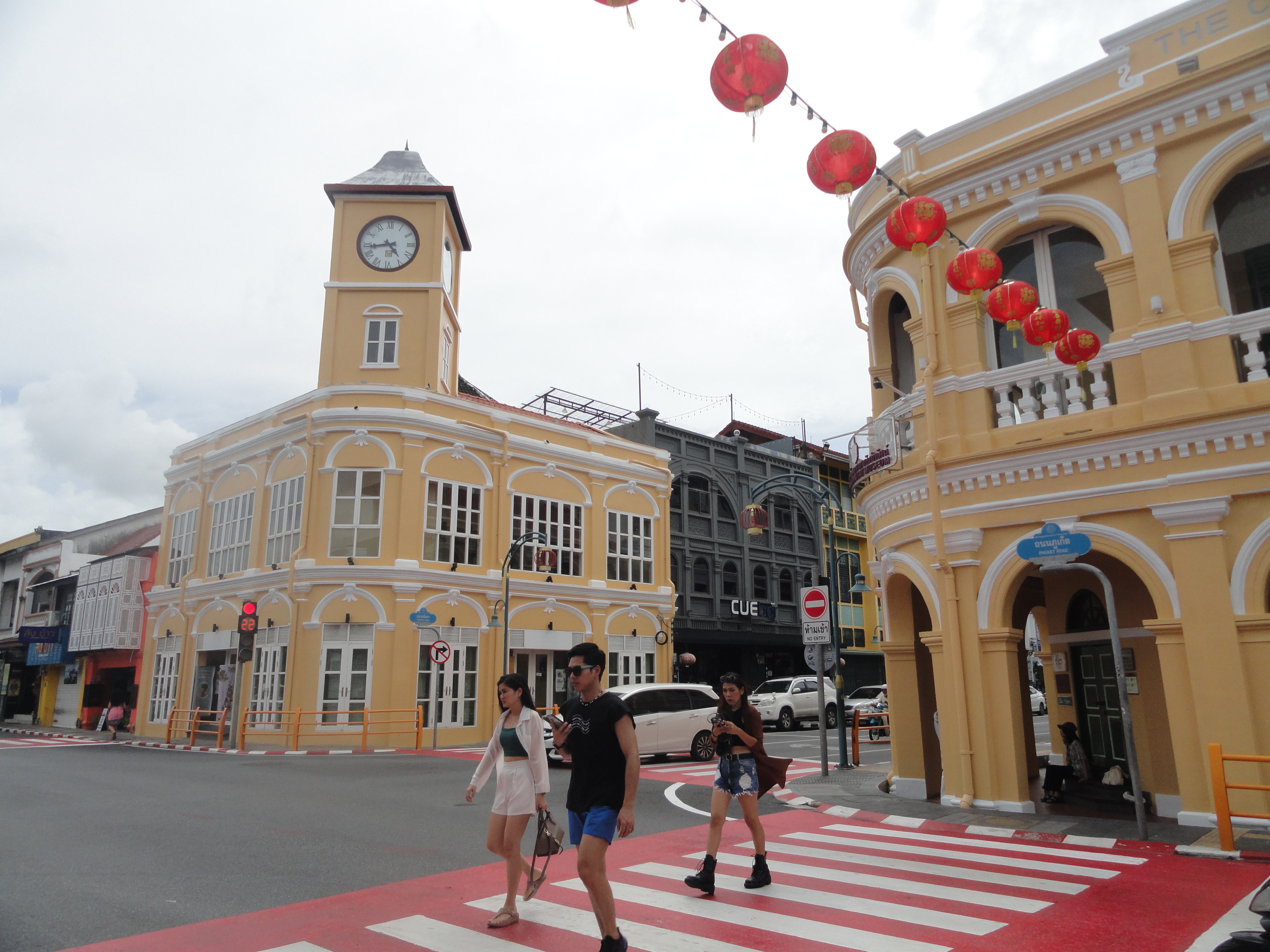
Phuket Old Town in 2022

Several buildings in the Old Town area of Phuket were constructed in a Sino-Portuguese architectural style. Majority of these were constructed in the early 1900s following the arrival of Chinese immigrants employed by the Portuguese, and a fire in 1903 which meant many buildings were rebuilt in a Sino-Portuguese style.

The Jardim Vasco da Gama in Belém, Lisbon, contains a Thai pavilion gifted by the Thai government. The pavilion was inaugurated in 2012 by Princess Sirindhorn in recognition of 500 years of Portuguese-Thai relations.

=== Cuisine ===
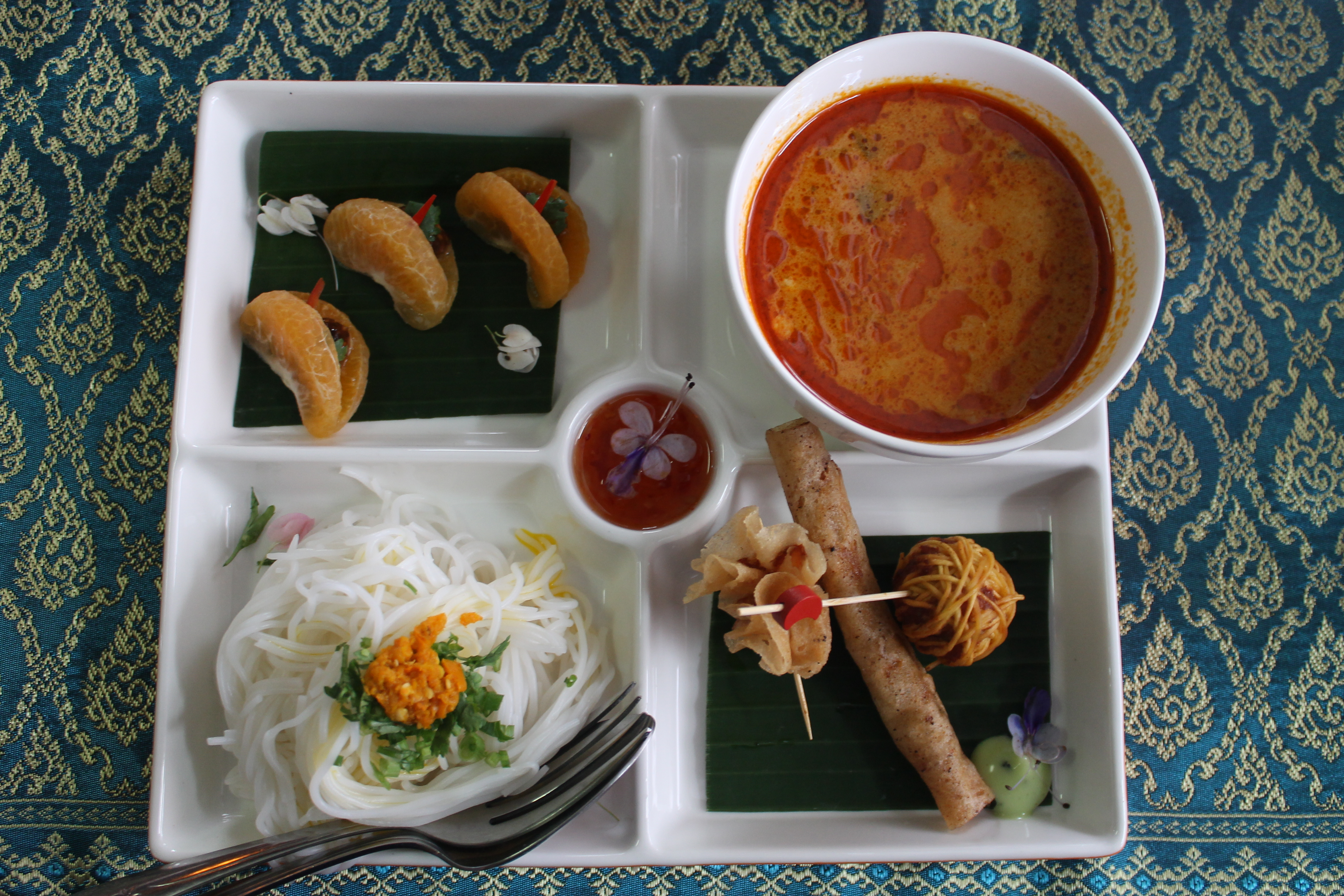
Khanom Chin Kaeng Kai Khua, a Luso-Thai cuisine, at Kudi Chin, Bangkok - 2020

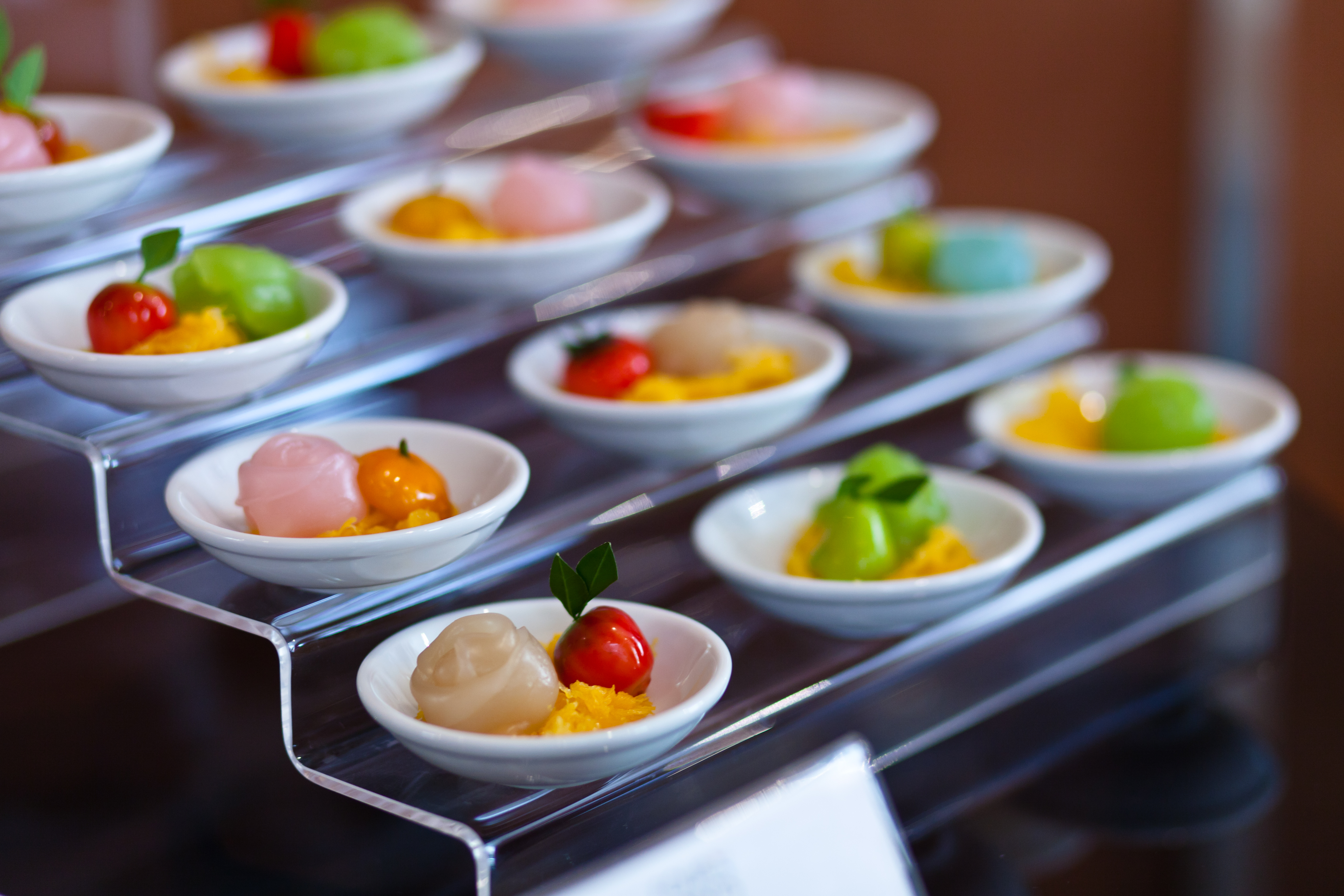
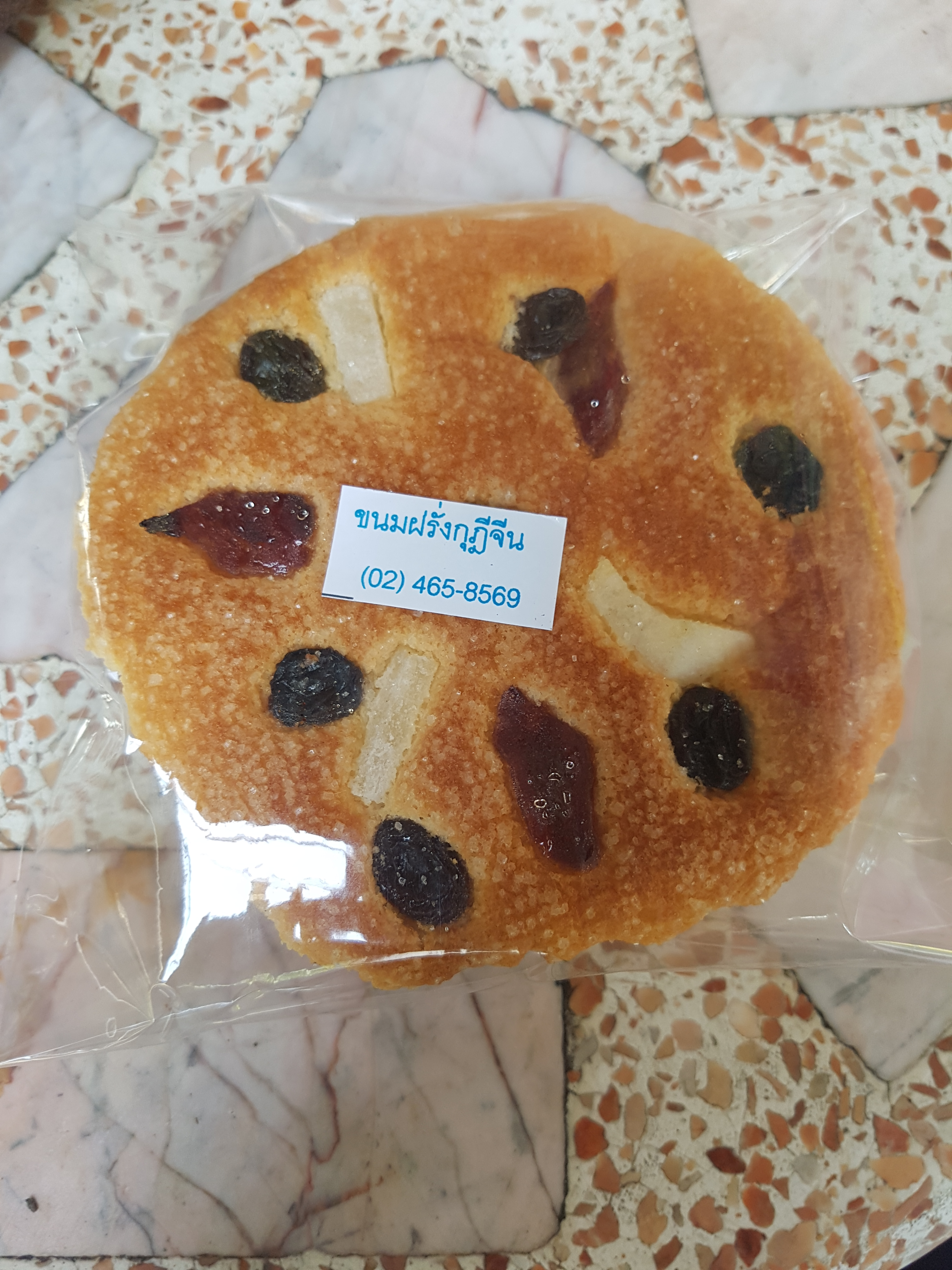
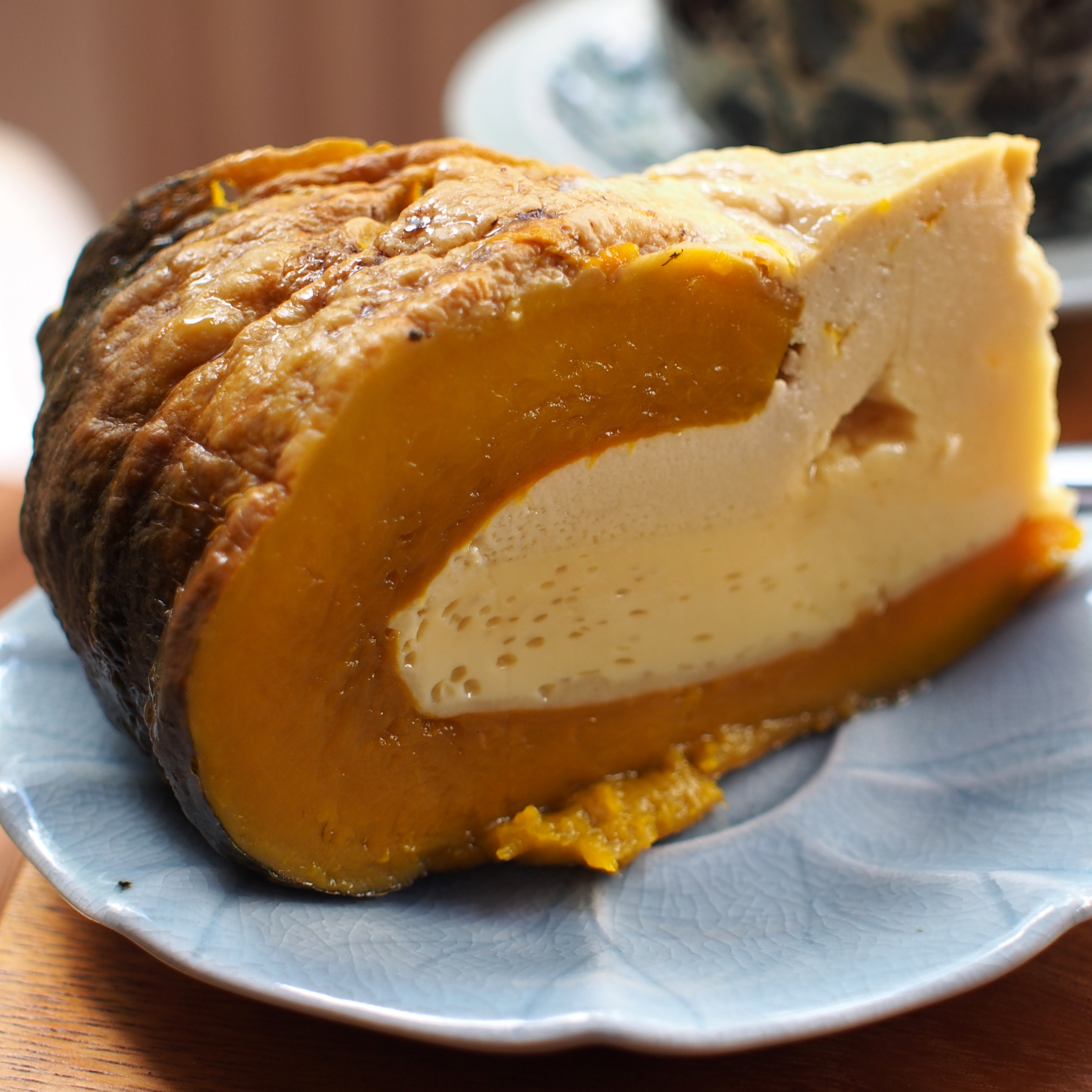
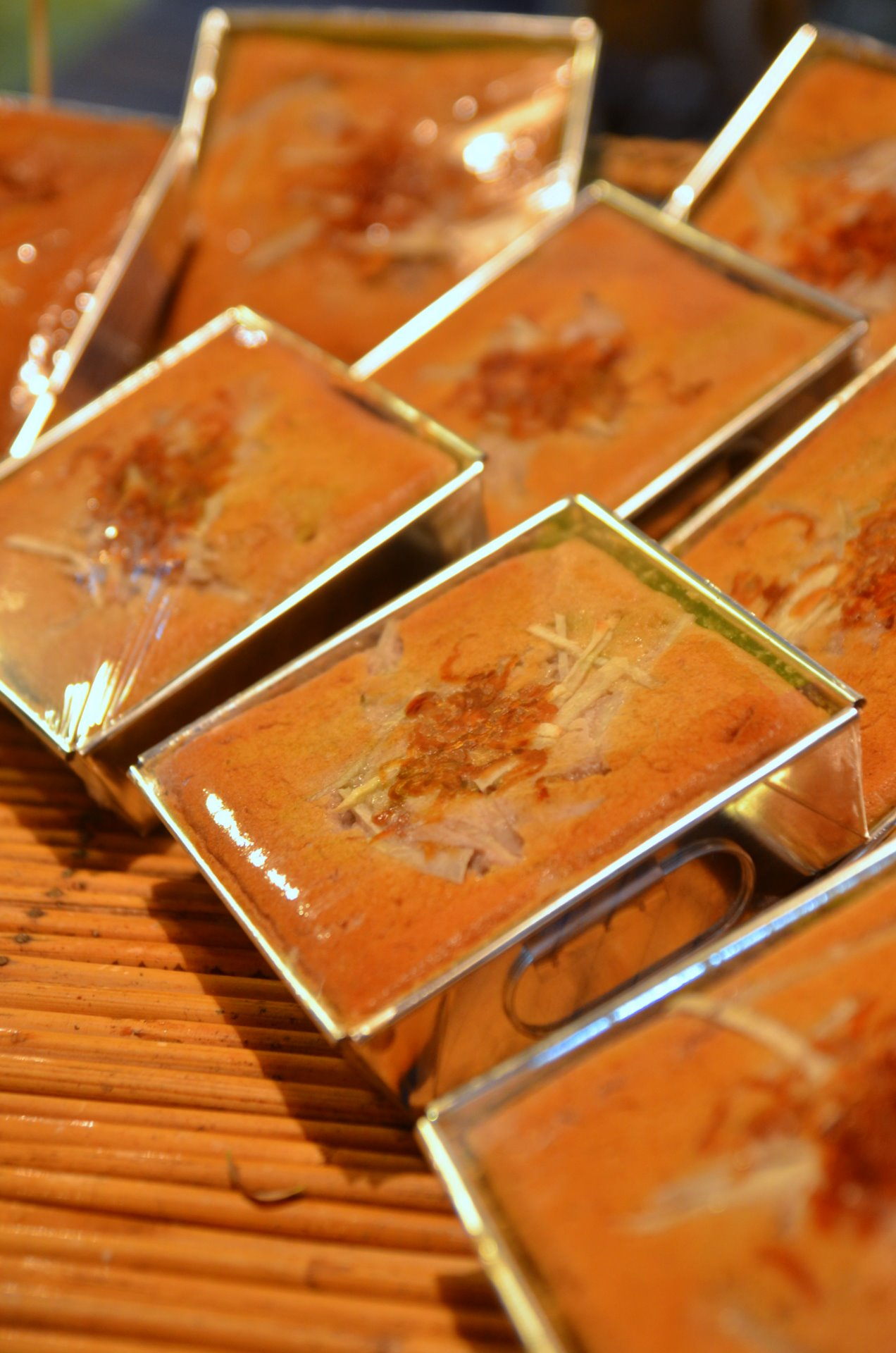
Clockwise from upper left: Luk chup, Khanom farang kudi chin, sangkhaya fakthong, and Khanom mo kaeng.

The Portuguese have had a significant impact on the cuisine of Thailand. Trade with Siam in the 16th and 17th centuries introduced several plants and foods originally from the Americas, such as cassava, chillies, papayas, pineapples, sunflowers, and sweet potatoes. Some, like chillies, are now integral parts of Thai cuisine.

Maria Guyomar de Pinha - a woman of mixed Japanese, Portuguese and Bengali ancestry raised in Siam - created many Thai desserts derived or influenced from Portuguese cuisine during the Ayutthaya period. Out of the nine auspicious Thai desserts, five of them were believed to have been created or adapted by Maria Guyomar from Portuguese desserts - thong yip from trouxas das caldas, thong yot and thong ek from ovos moles, foi thong from fios de ovos, and Khanom met khanun, where the Portuguese influenced how it was made. Other Thai food influenced by the Portuguese include luk chup from massapão, curry puffs, thong muan, sangkhaya, sangkhaya fakthong, Khanom phing, and Khanom mo kaeng.

The Portuguese community at Kudi Chin also created several new dishes by blending Portuguese cuisine with the local cuisine of the area - primarily Chinese and Thai. One of them is Khanom farang kudi chin, a sponge cake derived from Portuguese and Chinese cake styles. By 2018, only three families at Kudi Chin made the cake in the traditional way that had been passed down from the original Portuguese settlers.

=== Language ===
Several words in Thai are loanwords borrowed over from Portuguese. This includes words such as "sa-bùu" (Thai: สบู่; RTGS: Sabu) from "sabão" (“soap”); "bpang" (Thai: ปัง; RTGS: Pang) from "pão" ("bread"); "ka-la-mae" (Thai: กะละแม; RTGS: Kalamae) from "caramelo" (caramel); "krít-sà-dtang" (Thai: คริสตัง; RTGS: Khrittang), meaning 'Roman Catholic' from "cristão", meaning Christian; "sǎn-dtà-bpaa-bpaa" (Thai: สันตะปาปา; RTGS: Santa Papa) from "santo papa" (pope); and "rǐian" (Thai: เหรียญ; RTGS: Rian) from "real" (coin).

During early contact between Siam and the Europeans, Portuguese was used as a lingua franca between Europeans and the Siamese. Some treaties that used Portuguese as a lingua franca include the Siamese–American Treaty of Amity and Commerce.

=== Population ===
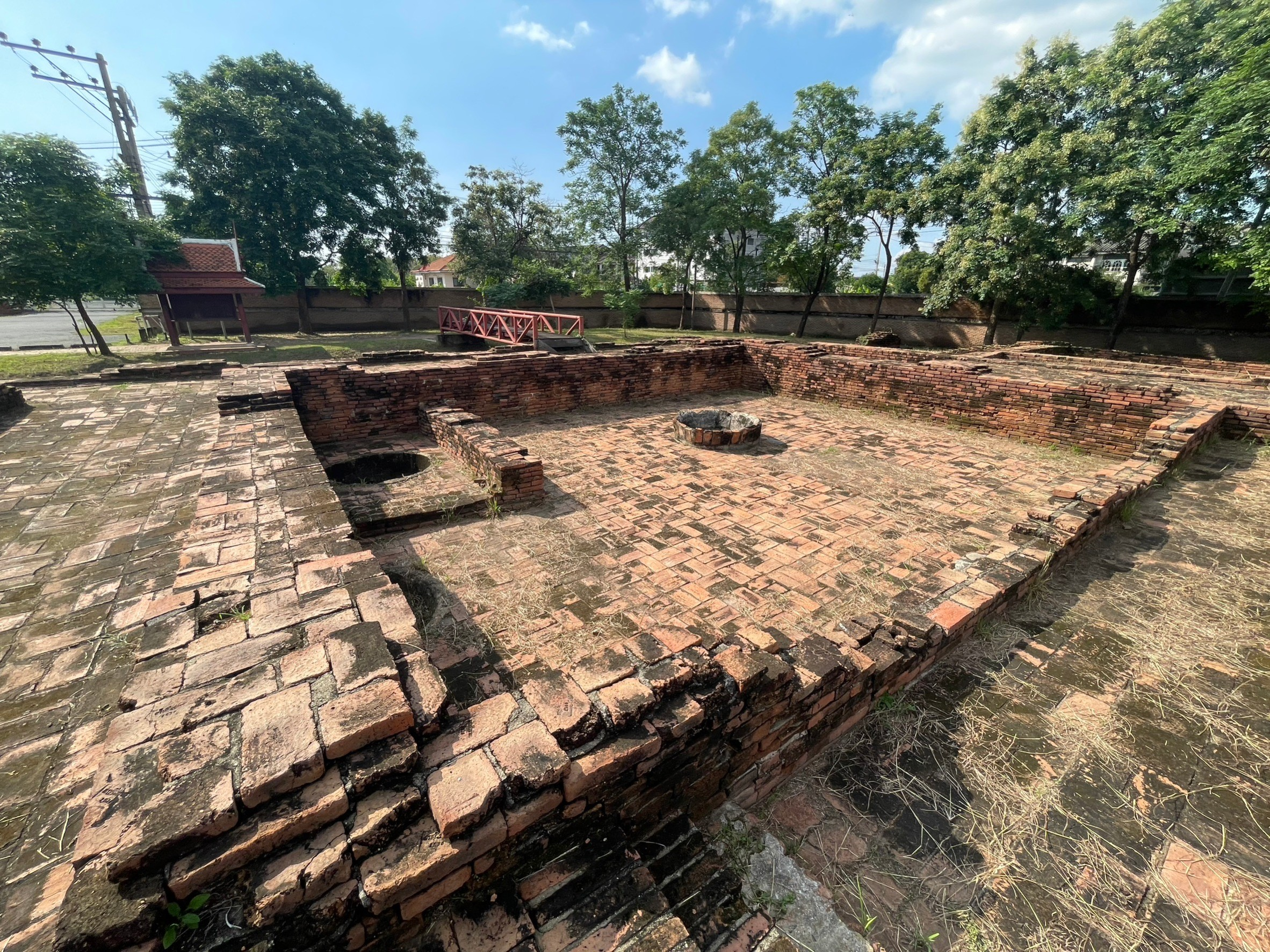
Remnants of Campos Portugues in 2023

According to Francisco de Assis Morais e Cunha Vaz Patto, ambassador of Portugal to Thailand from November 2015 to January 2021, the Thai expat community in Portugal was around 1,200 to 1,300 people.

==== Portuguese diaspora in Thailand ====
In 1540, King Chairachathirat rewarded 120 Portuguese mercenaries for their service against the Burmese by granting them land south of Ayutthaya in modern-day Samphao Lom. This later developed into the centre of the Portuguese community in Siam called 'Portuguese Village' (Portuguese: Campos Portugues). Situated on the Chao Phraya river's west bank, its population grew to 3,000 by 1767. Most likely the largest European community in Siam at the time, the Portuguese diaspora in Siam consisted of militiamen, shipbuilders, and merchants.

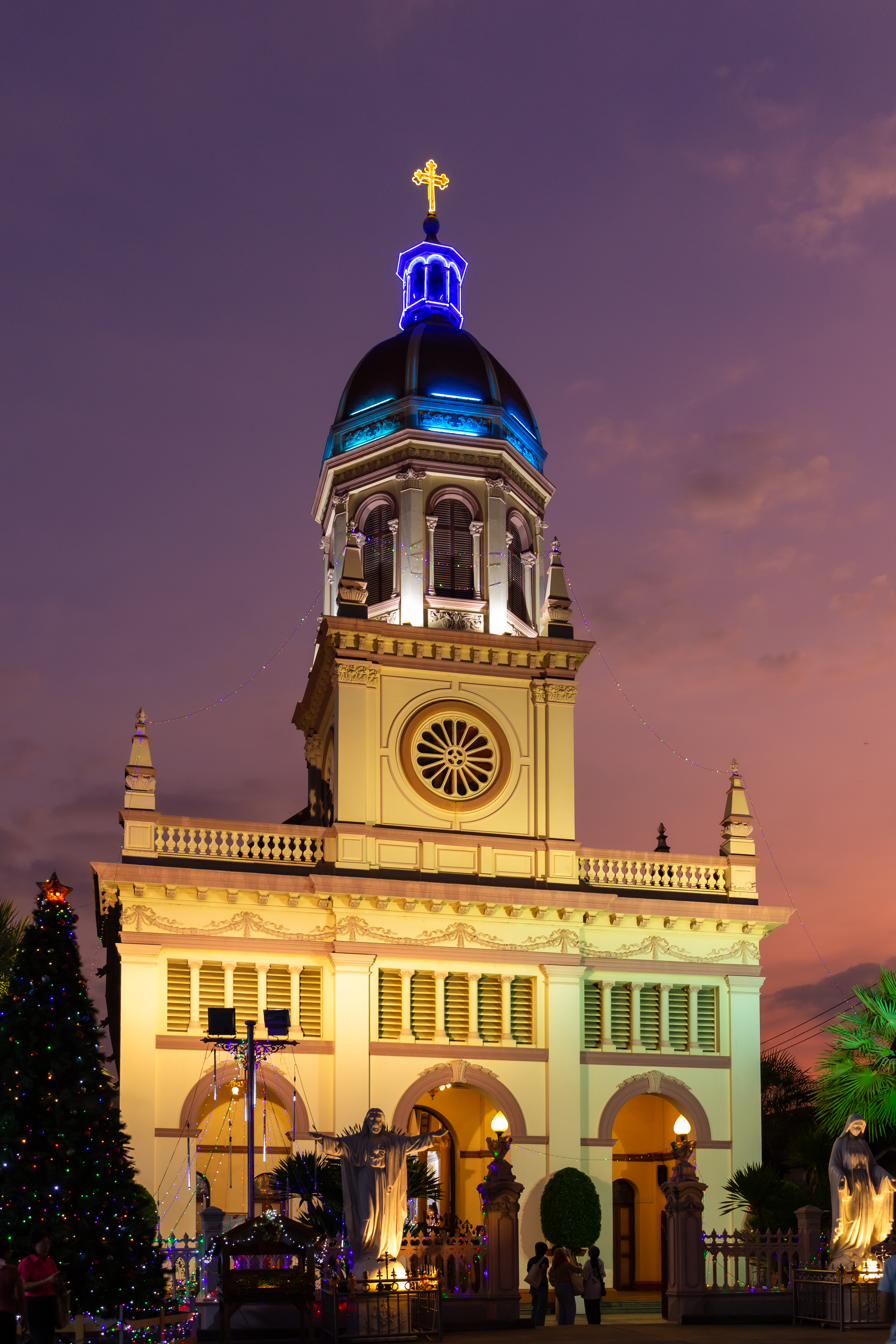
The Santa Cruz Church at Kudi Chin, Bangkok - 2022

Following the fall of Ayutthaya in 1767, the Portuguese regathered at three locations in Bangkok: around the Immaculate Conception Church in the Samsen area, Santa Cruz Church in Kudi Chin, and Holy Rosary Church in Talat Noi. Their descendants have gradually assimilated into Thai society, though the community, especially at Kudi Chin, still retains a distinctive identity. According to Portuguese ambassadors Vaz Patto and Weinstein, the number of Portuguese people living in Thailand in 2015 was around 1,000, dropping to around 200 in 2021, and then growing to 500 in 2023. Notable people of the Portuguese community include Francis Chit, an early Thai photographer who worked for people such as Kings Mongkut and Chulalongkorn.

=== Religion ===
The first Roman Catholic missionaries to Siam were Portuguese chaplains Friar Jeronimo da Cruz and Sebastiâo da Canto of the Dominican Order, who arrived in Ayutthaya in 1567. Following the Dominicans, the Franciscans arrived in Siam between 1582 and 1767. They were then followed by Jesuit missionary Balthasar Sequeira around 1606/07. During this time, Siam was tolerant of Christianity in comparison to other Asian nations like China or Vietnam who persecuted Christians. In 1669, the Papacy in Rome issued a papal bull giving the apostolic vicars that had resided in Siam for the previous years authority over all Catholics in Siam. When French missionaries arrived in 1662, the Catholic community estimated at 2,000 was served by ten Portuguese priests and one Spanish priest. Although mostly tolerated, there were periods of persecution such as during the reign of King Phetracha. In 1785, there were 413 Catholics of Portuguese origin concentrated around the Santa Cruz church in Kudi Chin.

== See also ==
- Foreign relations of Portugal
- Foreign relations of Thailand
