= Si Phraya (disambiguation) =

Si Phraya may refer to:

- Si Phraya Road, a road in Bangkok
- Si Phraya Pier, named after the road
- Si Phraya Subdistrict, which covers the area
