= Embassy of Portugal, Bangkok =

Diplomatic mission of Portugal in Thailand

Coordinates: 13°43′40″N 100°30′51″E

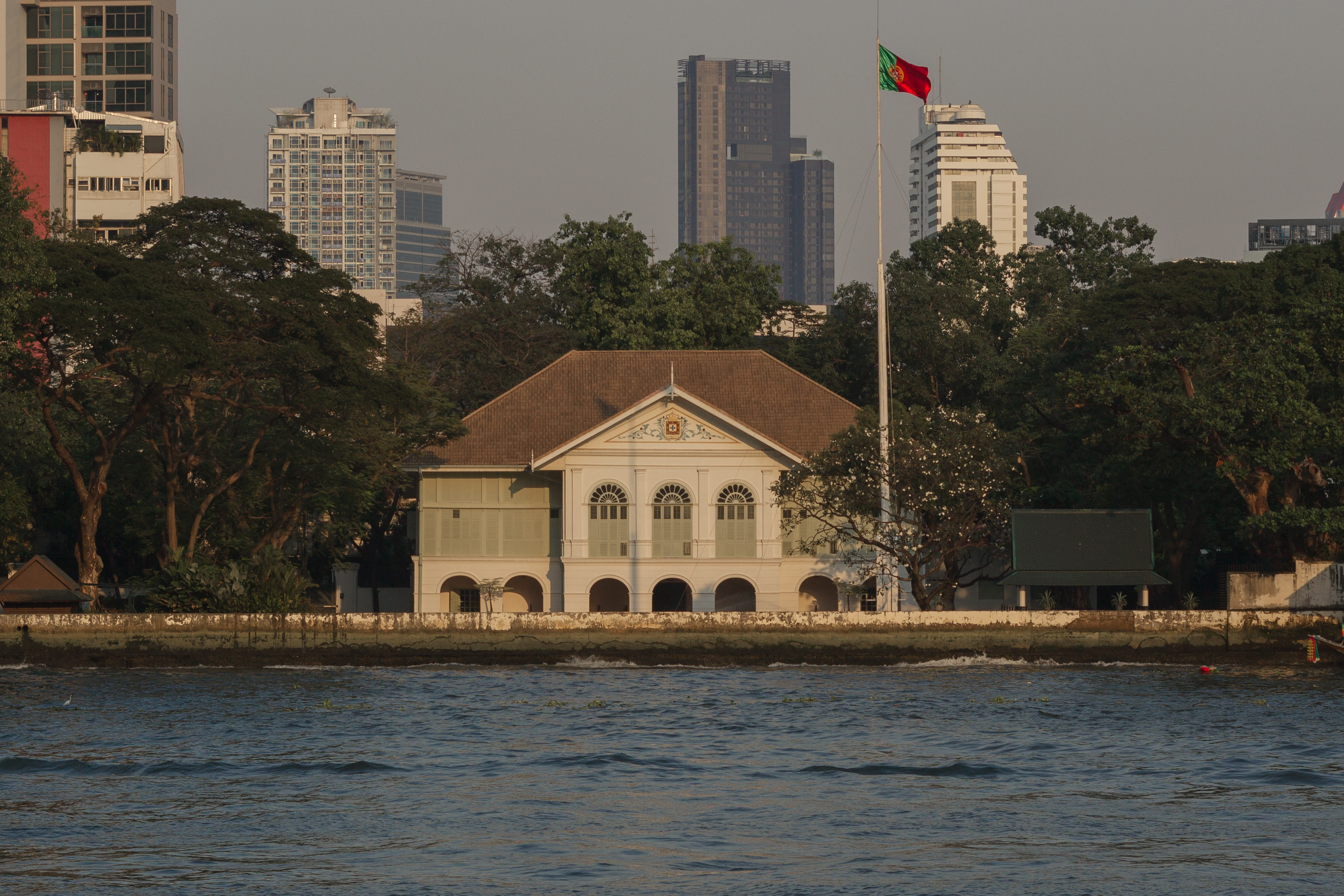
The ambassador's residence, seen from Iconsiam

The Embassy of Portugal in Bangkok is the diplomatic mission of Portugal in Thailand. It is located in Bang Rak District, on the eastern bank of the Chao Phraya River, and is served by Soi Charoen Krung 30 (also known as Captain Bush Lane). Dating to 1820, with the ambassador's residence built in 1860, it is the oldest diplomatic mission in Thailand, and the ambassador's residence has been recognized as an award-winning historic building.

== History ==
Portugal was the first European nation to come into contact with Siam in the 16th century, during the time of the Ayutthaya Kingdom. The Portuguese were granted land near the capital, and a sizeable community settled in Siam. Following the Fall of Ayutthaya in 1767 and the subsequent establishment of Thonburi and Rattanakosin as Siam's successor kingdoms, the Portuguese resettled in the new capitals, in the area of today's Bangkok.

In 1786, as thanks for Portugal's assistance in the Nine Armies' War against the Burmese, King Rama I granted a piece of land to Portugal, which would be used for the establishment of the Holy Rosary Church. The King also promised land for a factory (trading post), should the Portuguese wish to establish one. This was realised in 1820, during the reign of King Rama II. A piece of land on the river, not far from the church, was granted to the Portuguese Consul-General, Carlos Manoel da Silveira. The land, 72 wa (fathoms) along the waterfront and 50 wa wide, with two shipyards, had been the former residence of the Vietnamese Emperor Gia Long during his time in exile in Siam.

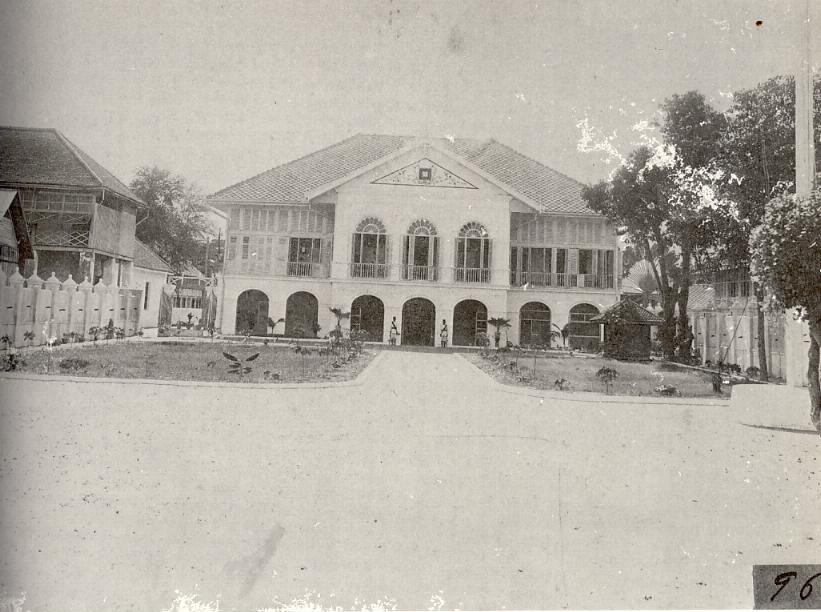
The legation in 1918

The original building, of bamboo and wood, was replaced by a masonry structure, the construction of which began in 1860. Plans were made for materials to be shipped in from Goa, but the ship was wrecked during the journey and local materials had to be used instead. Interruptions and delays led to construction being suspended in 1867. By 1875, the unfinished structure had deteriorated, and the consulate hired Italian-Austrian architect Joachim Grassi to rebuild it within a time frame of five months. The construction cost 10,000 Mexican dollars. The building was inaugurated by Consul Antonio Feliciano Marques Pereira, and has since served as the residence of the consul, and later of the ambassador, following the consulate's elevation to embassy status. By this time, Charoen Krung Road had been built, and the embassy would come to be served by the side-street known as Captain Bush Lane. Other foreign missions, including those of Britain and France, would also be established nearby, and the area became a centre of the European expatriate community during the turn of the 19th–20th centuries.

== Architecture ==
The Ambassador's residence is a two-storey building built in Colonial style. The floor plan is rectangular, with a central front porch and gable projecting from the hipped roof demonstrating Neo-Palladian influence. The front façade, which faces the river, features a loggia running the entire length of the lower floor. On the upper floor, the central porch has three arched windows, divided by pilasters, above which the coat of arms of Portugal decorates the gable.

The entrance, decorated with ceramic tiles from Portugal, opens into a large hall, which is a few steps lower than outside ground level due to subsidence and subsequent raising of the exterior grounds to prevent flooding. The lower floor previously contained offices, which have been relocated to a separate building, and now hosts a reception room. A prison cell, used in the days of extraterritoriality, also used to be located in the basement. A staircase leads up to a central hall on the upper floor, which grants access to all rooms, including the bedroom, sitting room, and small and large dining rooms. Verandas line the front and the rear of the upper floor.

The building has undergone multiple changes, renovations and restorations, including the installation of electricity and air conditioning during the 20th century, and most recently in 2013 to bring the building closer to its original state. The original teak, used for structural beams and upper-level flooring, remains intact. The building is the oldest diplomatic residence in Bangkok, and received the ASA Architectural Conservation Award in 1984.

Among the decorative objects in the residence are a pair of carved wooden doors from at least the 18th century, which had been brought from the original Portuguese settlement in Ayutthaya. Several bronze cannons guard the entrance to the residence.

A former warehouse, part of the historical factory or feitoria, now serves as the chancery. It underwent major renovations in 2004, with contributions by Portuguese architects and engineers. Retaining the original wooden structural work, metal and glass now frame the modern and "chic" offices, as well as the Portuguese Cultural Center's classroom, library and resources centre on the lower floor. A third building contains staff residences.

The embassy has relatively large grounds and gardens, part of which it leases to the next-door Royal Orchid Sheraton Hotel for the hotel's swimming pool and tennis courts. Flood walls along the riverbank and pumps are needed to protect the compound from the river.

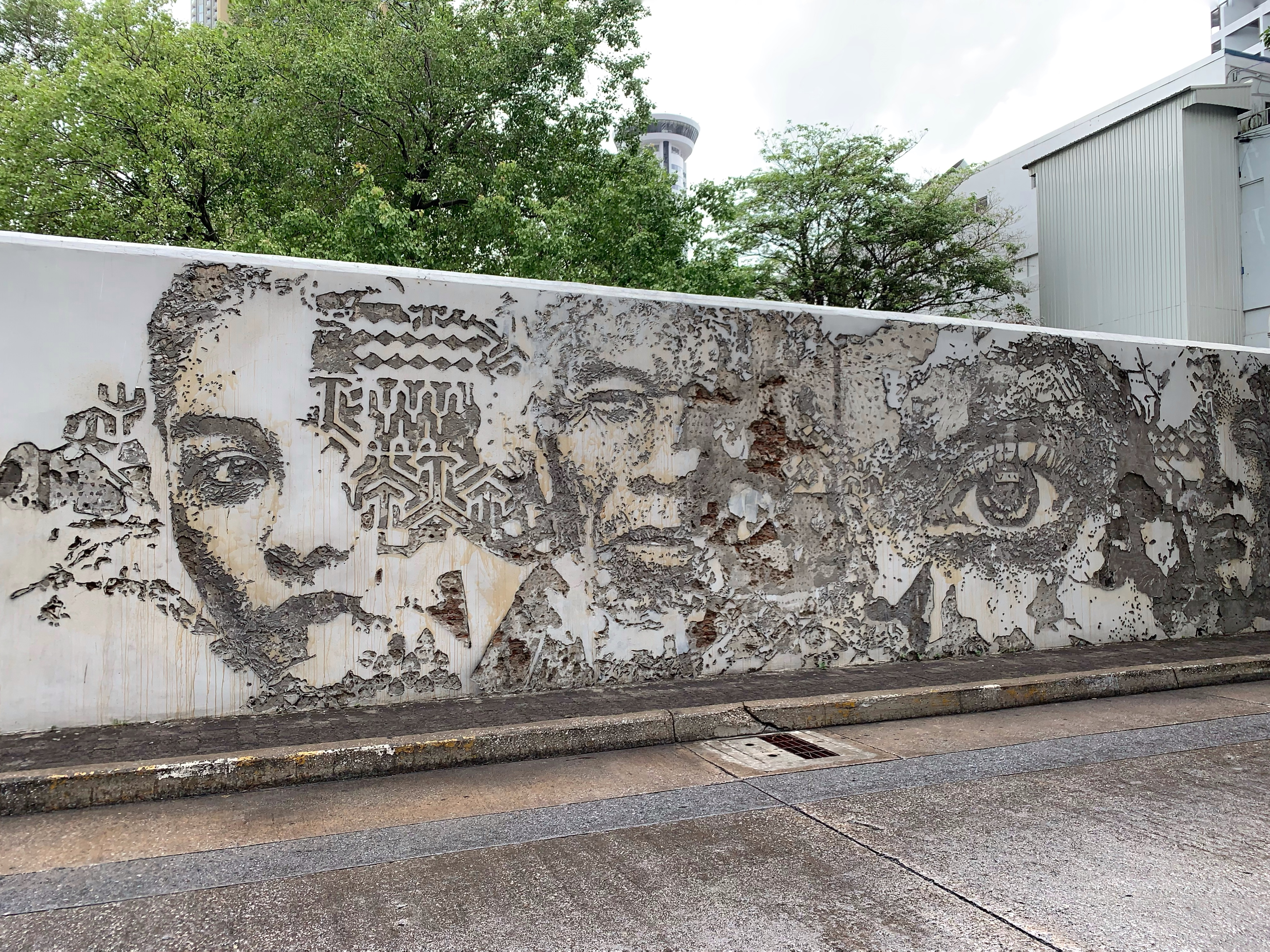
Mural on the compound wall, installed by street artist Vhils

In 2017, a mural was installed on the walls of the embassy by Portuguese street artist Vhils, as part of his Scratching the Surface series. The project, sponsored by the embassy, was part of an effort to promote the surrounding neighbourhood as Bangkok's Creative District, led by the Thailand Creative and Design Center.

== Operations ==
The Portuguese embassy in Bangkok is a relatively small diplomatic mission. As of 2018, it has seven members of staff.

The Portuguese Ambassador to Thailand is also accredited to Myanmar, Cambodia, Laos, Vietnam and Malaysia. The embassy works on supporting the small community — numbering about 1,750 people as of 2022 — of Portuguese nationals in the region, as well as promoting bilateral relations in culture, commercial activity, tourism and academia. The current Ambassador, as of 2025, is Luiz de Albuquerque Veloso.

== See also ==
- Portugal–Thailand relations
