= Italthai Industrial Group =

International company

Italthai Industrial
- Industry: Heavy equipment
- Founded: 1955; 71 years ago
- Headquarters: 2013 New Petchburi Road, Bangkapi, Huai Khwang, Bangkok, Thailand
- Area served: Southeast Asia
- Subsidiaries: Amari Hotels and Resorts

Italthai Industrial Company Limited (commonly known as ITALTHAI) is a company of the ITALTHAI Group. The group is a conglomerate with more than 5,000 employees in six countries. Italthai Industrial Company Limited is one of the major distributors and providers of after-sales service for construction and industrial equipment in Thailand and neighboring countries. The company has over than 10 branches in Thailand as well as a newly opened Vientiane office.

== History ==
Italthai was founded in 1955 as a partnership between Chaijudh Karnasuta and Giorgio Berlingieri, originally operating as an import trader. Three years later, the two owners would establish Italian-Thai Development, though the two companies remain separate and operate independently.

Italthai began as an energy and transportation company, and has gradually become a group of industries. It imports wine and spirits, as well as the mineral water brands Perrier and Vittel.

In 1980 it began supplying machinery to the State Railway of Thailand and the private industrial sector in the country. In 1984 the company along with the Mandarin Oriental Hotel Group developed the River City Shopping Complex in Bangkok. In 2006 it expanded into the food processing business, particularly potatoes.
