= Amari Hotels and Resorts =

Thai-based hotel and resort chain

Amari Hotels & Resorts Company Limited
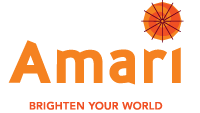

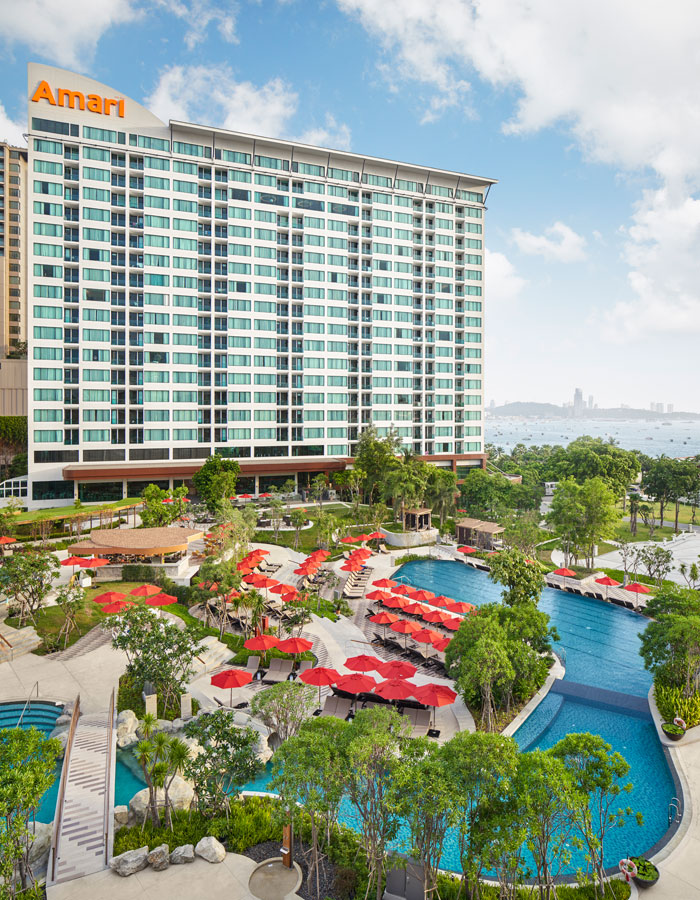
- Amari Hotel in Pattaya, Thailand
- Industry: Hospitality, tourism
- Founded: 1965
- Headquarters: Bangkok, Thailand
- Products: Hotels, resorts
- Parent: Italthai Group
- Website: www.amari.com

Amari Hotels and Resorts is a Thai-based hotel and resort chain owned by ONYX Hospitality Group which was founded in 1965, operating a network of properties in urban and resort destinations throughout Thailand and Asia.

== History ==
Founded in 1965 in Thailand by the parent company Italthai, under Siam Lodge Hotel Group, in 1992 it became Amari Hotels and Resorts Company Limited.

In April 1995, Amari formed a joint venture with Philippine Public Estates Authority to form a reclamation project called Freedom Islands in the Philippines. Though it was approved by then-President Fidel V. Ramos, it never came to fruition because it was marred by allegations of corruption.

In 2010, Amari Hotels and Resorts announced a new corporate structure with the creation of ONYX Hospitality Group, as a hotel management company. This restructure has allowed the company to pursue its expansion plans in moving beyond Thailand.

ONYX Hospitality Group has a range of hotels, resorts, serviced apartments and spa brands including Amari, Shama, OZO, Oriental Residence, Maai Spa and Breeze Spa.

In 2020, the brand launched a refreshed brand identity 'Brighten Your World' to celebrate contemporary Thainess; food, arts, design, architecture, wellness, festivities and fun through its service, product design, brand signatures and experiences.

== Hotels ==
As of November 2024, Amari has 14 properties in Thailand, Sri Lanka, Laos, Malaysia, and Bangladesh.

Hotel/Resort	Location	Country
Amari Don Muang Airport Bangkok	Bangkok	Thailand
Amari Colombo	Colombo	Sri Lanka
Amari Bangkok	Bangkok	Thailand
Amari Pattaya	Pattaya	Thailand
Amari Hua Hin	Hua Hin	Thailand
Amari Koh Samui	Koh Samui	Thailand
Amari Vogue Krabi	Krabi	Thailand
Amari Phuket	Phuket	Thailand
Amari Buriram United	Buriram	Thailand
Amari Vang Vieng	Vang Vieng	Laos
Amari Johor Bahru	Johor Bahru	Malaysia
Amari Dhaka	Dhaka	Bangladesh
Amari Kuala Lumpur	Kuala Lumpur	Malaysia
Amari SPICE Penang	Penang	Malaysia

== Dancing with the Stars ==
In January 2013, BBC Worldwide Ltd. partnered with Amari to bring television show Dancing with the Stars to Thailand. The premier of Dancing with the Stars (Thailand) aired on 7 January 2013 and ran for a total of 7 x 90-minute episodes.
