= River City Bangkok =

- Location: Si Phraya Pier, Bangkok, Thailand
- Coordinates: 13.7304°N 100.5133°E
- Opened: 1 December 1984
- Developer: Italthai Group and Mandarin Oriental Hotel Group
- Manager: Chao Phraya Development Corporation
- Owner: Italthai Group and Mandarin Oriental Hotel Group
- Floor area: 47,567 m^{2} (512,010 sq ft) (total retailed area)
- Floors: 4
- Parking: For about 500 cars
- Website: www.rivercitybangkok.com

River City Bangkok (RCB) is the premier hub of art, antiques and cultured lifestyles center in Bangkok, Thailand. It is on the Chao Phraya River on the Si Phraya Pier near many large hotels. It is accessible by car or boat.

== History ==
River City Bangkok, The Anchor of Arts & Antiques was Designed by Krisda Arunvongse na Ayudhya and developed by the Italthai Group and The Mandarin Oriental Hotel Group, it opened on 1 December 1984 with total floor area of 47,567 m².

== Composition ==
Tenants of River City Bangkok are 60 percent art and antique shops, 20 percent lifestyle shops specialized in leather work, silks, tailored suits, furniture and home décor, and 20 percent restaurants and cafes, totalling to 160 shops. The four floors are arranged by categories of goods and services. The RCB Artery Zone is designed to host events. RCB Galleria on the second floor is well-suited to gallery-style art exhibitions.

== River City Auction (RCB Auctions) ==
Established in July 1985, Riverside Auction House is an arts and antiques auction house. Every first Saturday of the month for the past 30 years, it has held 400 auctions consisting of 80,000 transactions and over 700 million baht in total sales.

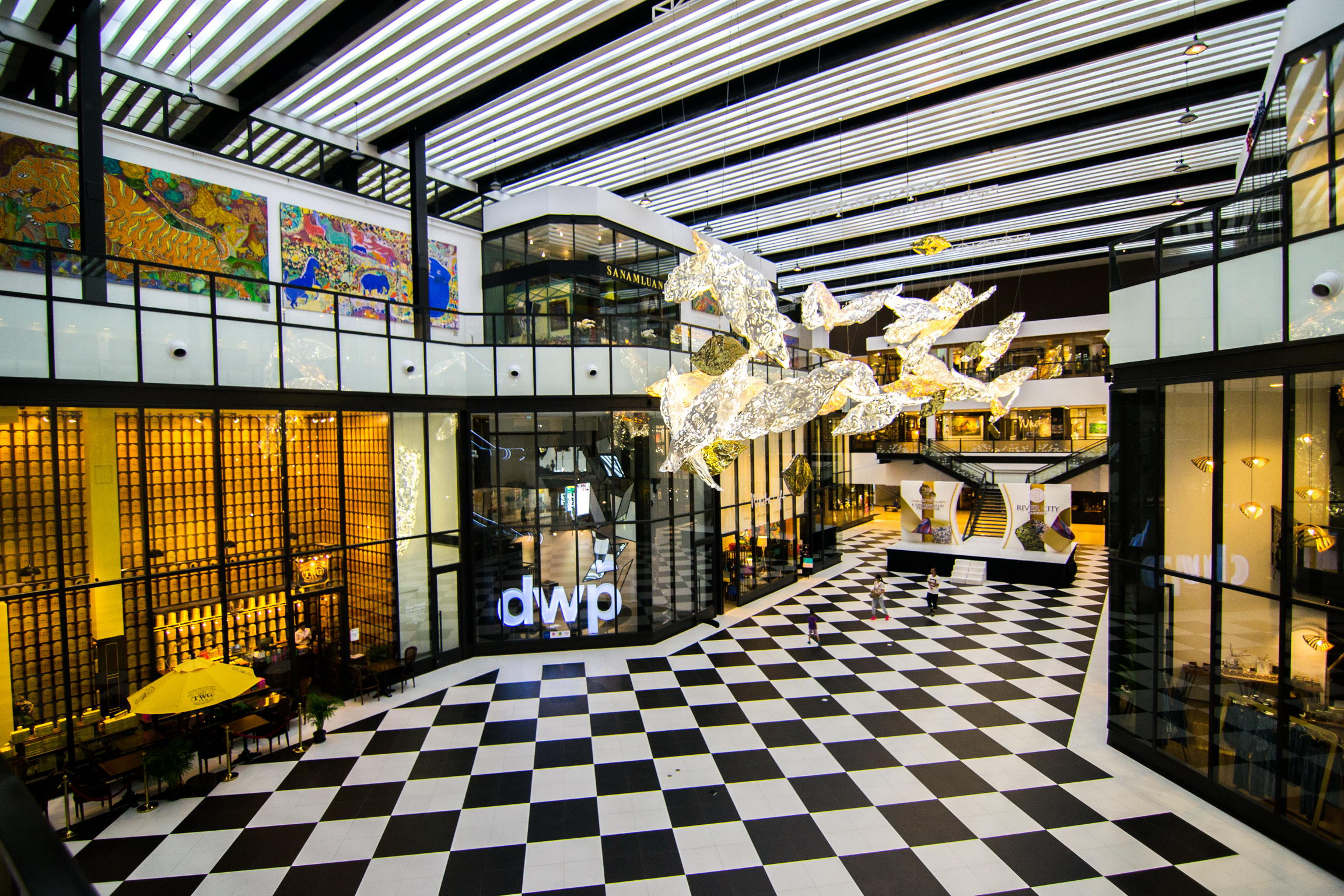
RCB Artery

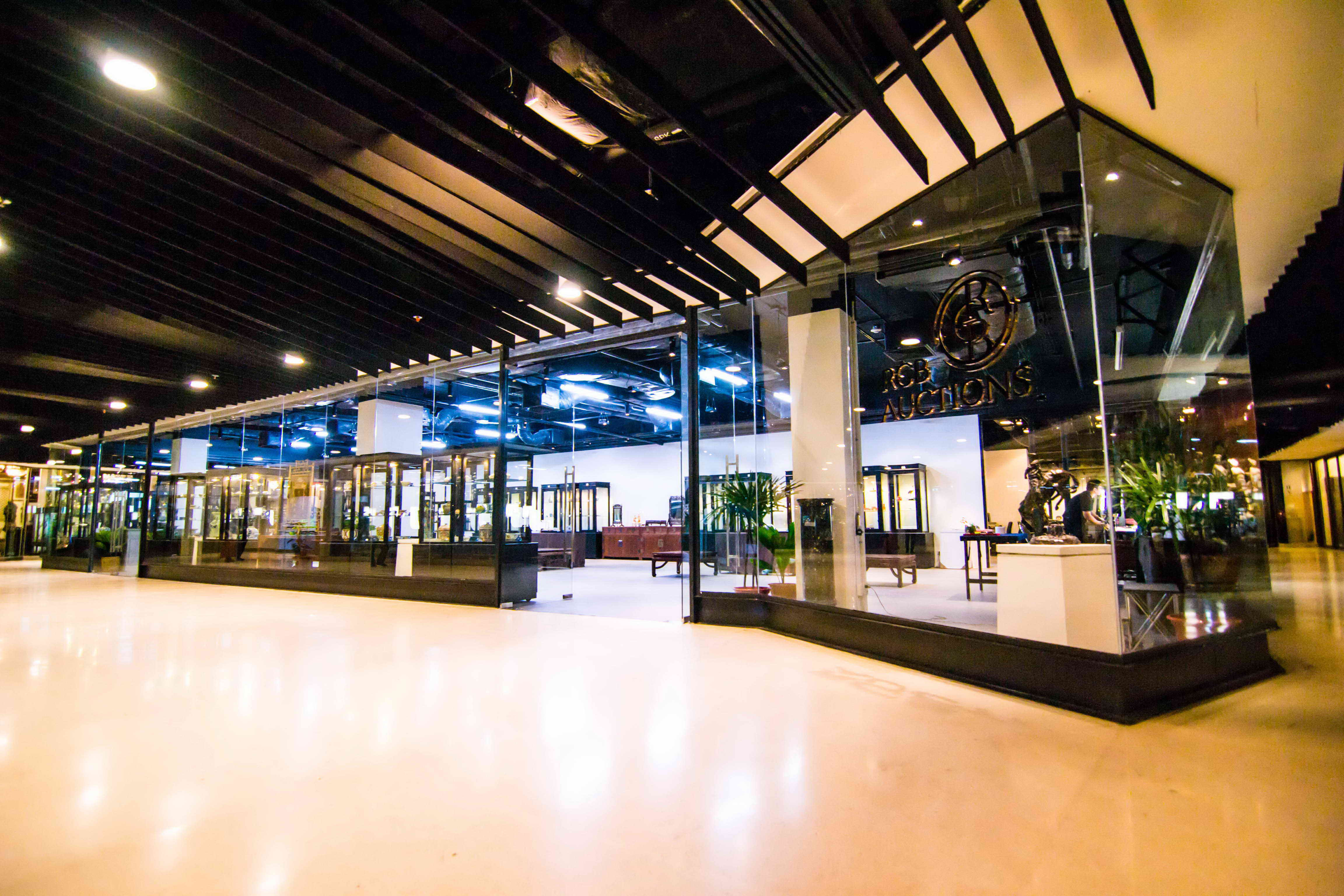
RCB Auctions

== See also ==
- List of shopping malls in Thailand
- List of largest shopping malls in Thailand
