= Luk chup =

Thai desert of marzipan

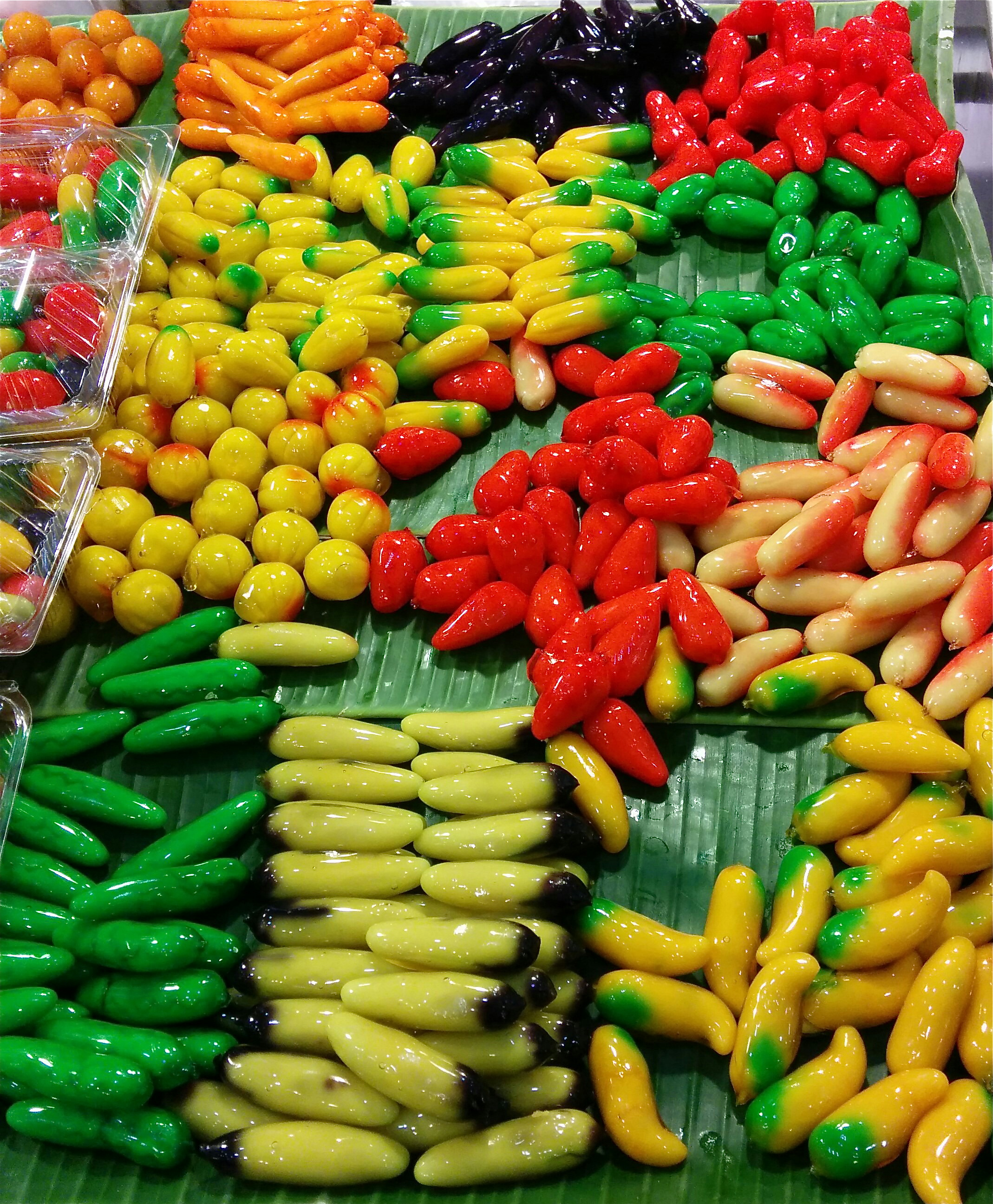
Luk chup

Luk chup (Thai: ลูกชุบ, pronounced [lûːk t͡ɕʰúp]), also spelled look choop, is a Thai dessert derived from the Portuguese massapão (marzipan). The original Portuguese version uses almonds as the main ingredient; given the absence of almonds in Thailand, luk chup instead uses mung beans.

Traditionally, luk chup was only made for royalty, but is nowadays available in general dessert shops in Thailand. The shape of luk chup is molded into fruit or vegetable shapes such as mangoes, chilies or oranges, with colors that match the color of the foods they represent.

Typical ingredients in luk chup include mung beans, coconut milk, sugar, jelly powder, water, and food coloring. The beans, coconut milk, and sugar are mixed into a paste, from which the luk chup is then formed. The food coloring can be painted onto the dessert, and it is sometimes dipped in agar to provide a shiny appearance.

== Etymology ==
The Thai name Luk chup consists of two words. The first word, Luk (Thai: ลูก, pronounced [lûːk]), means "ball" or "small rounded object", while the second word, chup (Thai: ชุบ, pronounced [tɕʰúp]), means "to dip" or "to coat" in this context. The name refers to the preparation process, in which shaped mung bean paste is dipped in gelatin to create a glossy outer layer.

== Appearance ==
Luk chup is traditionally molded into shapes of fruits and vegetables, painted with bright colors that resemble the real appearance, such as oranges, mangoes, apples, and chilies. Small leaves or stems may also be added for aesthetic and realistic look. Nowadays, Luk Chup may have more creative designs influenced by modern Thai culture or trends such as Luk Chup in cartoon shapes, Thai dishes, or animal shapes.

== History ==
Luk chup is a traditional Thai royal dessert. The origin of Luk chup is believed to have happened during the Ayutthaya (Thai: อยุธยา, pronounced [ʔà.jùt.tʰá.jāː]) period. Luk chup was developed from a Portuguese dessert called “Marzipan”. Instead of almonds, it was adapted to mung bean which is a local ingredient. Marzipan is believed to have been introduced to Siam (Thai: สยาม, pronounced [sà.jǎːm]) through traders and missionaries during the reign of King Narai the Great (Thai: สมเด็จพระนารายณ์มหาราช, pronounced [sǒm.dèt.pʰráʔ.naː.raːj.ma.hǎː.râːt]). Marie Guimar de Pina , or Thao Thong Kip Ma (Thai: ท้าวทองกีบม้า, pronounced [tʰáːw.tʰɔːŋ.kìːp.máː]), is often mentioned in this context, as she has introduced new dessert recipes influenced by Portuguese culture at the Ayutthaya court. Though, there was not a historical record that specifically mentioned Luk Chup until the Rattanakosin (Thai: รัตนโกสินทร์, pronounced [rát.tà.ná.koː.sǐn])period. During the reign of King Rama IV (Thai: พระบาทสมเด็จพระจอมเกล้าเจ้าอยู่หัว, pronounced [pʰráʔ.bàːt.sǒm.dèt.pʰráʔ.tɕɔːm.klâːw.tɕâːw.jùː.hǔːa]), records described a type of Luk chup shaped like melon seeds. This suggests that the dessert was known in Siam by at least the mid-19th century, although its exact origin remains uncertain.

== Ingredients ==
Filling Paste	Gelatin Coat
Mung bean/ Soy bean; Coconut milk; Sugar; Salt; Food coloring; Jasmine/Rose essence	Agar-agar powder; Water; Sugar

== Preparation ==
=== Filling Paste ===
1. Rinse the peeled mung beans thoroughly until the water runs clear. Soak them in water for approximately 3 hours to allow them to absorb water and soften.
2. Rinse the soaked mung beans and place them in a steamer. Leave a hole in the center to allow steam to escape. Steam over medium heat for approximately 15–20 minutes, or until the beans are cooked.
3. Blend the steamed mung beans with sugar, salt, and coconut milk until the mixture is smooth and well combined.
4. Pour the mixture into a pan and cook over low heat, stirring continuously for approximately 1 hour until it forms a smooth, uniform paste. Once the paste is well combined, use a spatula to break it up and spread it out to help it cool more quickly.

=== Gelatin Coat ===
1. Add water, agar-agar powder and sugar into a pot to boil.
2. Cook the mixture over medium heat for approximately 15 minutes, stirring continuously in the same direction to prevent lumps from forming. Once the mixture comes to a boil, continue stirring for another 2–3 minutes. When the agar-agar powder has completely dissolved, turn off the heat and allow the mixture to cool for approximately 5 minutes.

=== Shaping and Coating ===
1. After the mung bean paste filling has cooled, add the jasmine or rose essence and knead the filling by hand to make it smoother and softer.
2. Take approximately half a teaspoon of mung bean paste filling and shape it into the desired vegetable or fruit shape.
3. Skewer the shaped mung bean paste, then dip it in or paint it with food coloring mixed with water to achieve the desired color intensity.
4. Once the decoration is complete, dip the pieces into the prepared agar mixture. Allow the agar to set once, then dip them again for a glossy finish.

== See also ==
- List of Thai desserts
