= Captain Bush Lane =

Street in Bangkok, Thailand

Coordinates: 13°43′44″N 100°30′51″E

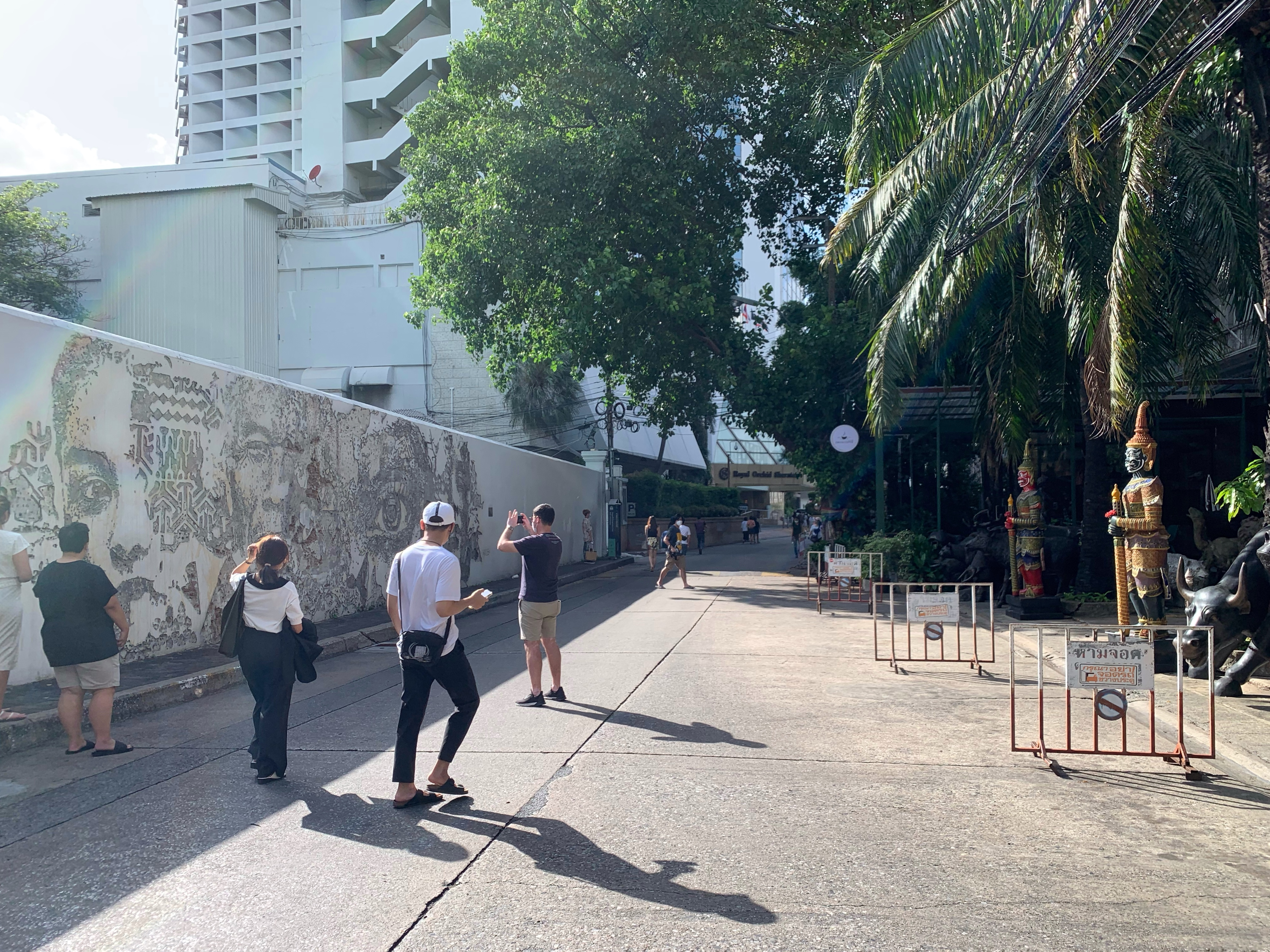
Captain Bush Lane, 2021

Captain Bush Lane, now officially known as Soi Charoen Krung 30 (Thai: ซอยเจริญกรุง 30), is a side-street (trok or soi) branching off Charoen Krung Road in Bang Rak District of Bangkok, Thailand. It was home to several members of Bangkok's early European expatriate community during the turn of the 19th–20th centuries, including Captain John Bush, an influential English sea captain after whom the street is named.

== History ==
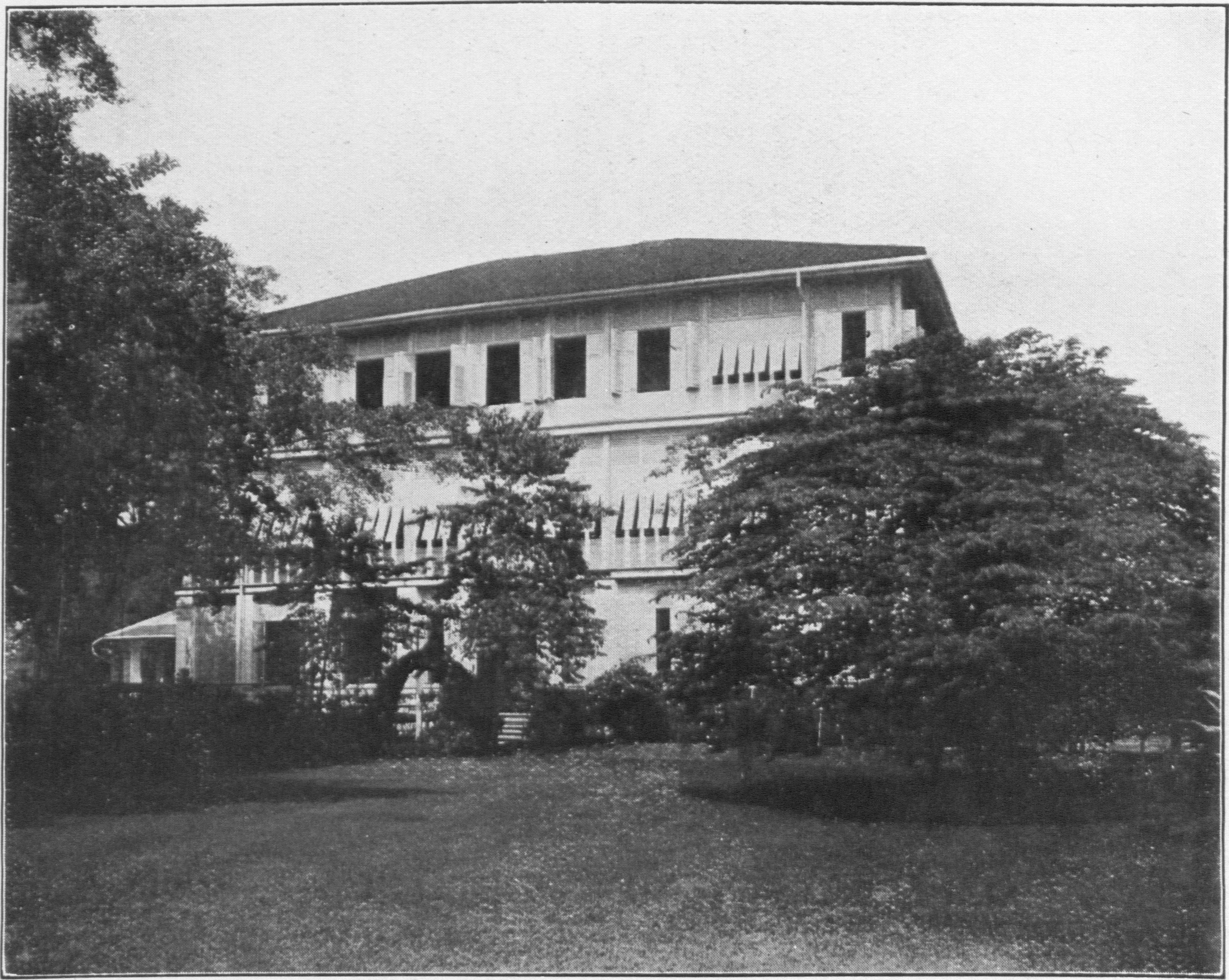
The Hongkong and Shanghai Bank's headquarters was located in the area for 87 years.

During the reign of King Mongkut (Rama IV), the Chao Phraya riverside area south of Khlong Phadung Krung Kasem, just outside the boundaries of the city proper, was settled by European expatriates. Numerous consulates were established here, and Charoen Krung Road, completed in 1864, was built to serve the area, which is now known as Bang Rak.

The riverside area now served by Soi 30 used to be the area of a Buddhist temple called Wat Kaeo Fa (วัดแก้วฟ้า). During the 1880s, part of the temple grounds were used for the establishment of the Hongkong and Shanghai Bank and the United Club (a Western social club). Streets (now Captain Bush Lane and the final stretch of Si Phraya Road) were built to serve the area, which also became home to several European expatriates, including consular officials and Captain Bush himself.

In a letter dated 25 March 1898, Captain Bush and twelve other foreigners made a complaint to the foreign minister regarding the stench and hygienic hazards emanating from the temple's charnel grounds, which had resulted in the death from cholera of a fellow European living in the area. A subsequent official investigation found that the area was the site of a public latrine, that some locals kept pigs, which contributed to the smell, and that the temple's old graveyard was being used as an open refuse dump. The investigation suggested that the temple be relocated and the area redeveloped. During the same time, the temple's abbot also complained to Prince Naris about the prohibition on cremation imposed on the temple, which adversely affected its finances, already constrained by being in the middle of a European community. The Prince subsequently recommended the relocation to King Chulalongkorn (Rama V), who reluctantly approved, although it took around a decade in total before the temple was re-established as Wat Kaeo Chaem Fa (วัดแก้วแจ่มฟ้า) at a new site on Si Phraya Road, donated by the Privy Purse in exchange for the former grounds.

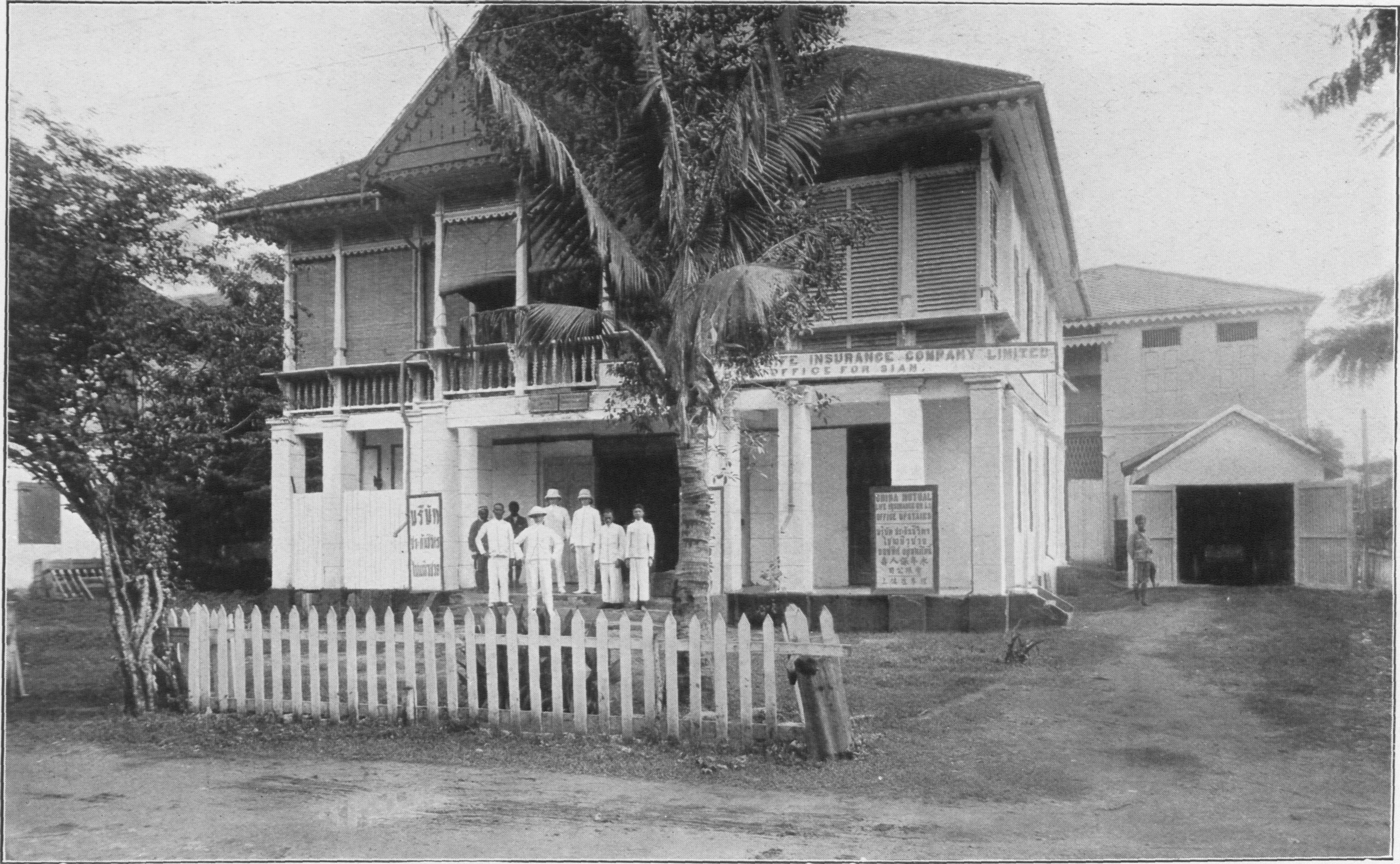
The offices of Louis T. Leonowens, Ltd., on Privy Purse property formerly Wat Kaeo Fa's

King Chulalongkorn bestowed the land to Princess Saisavali Bhiromya, one of his minor consorts, with the Privy Purse managing its proceeds. The northern plot of land was rented to Louis T. Leonowens' trading company, who built offices and warehouses, while the southern plot was rented to the French beverage company Societe Francaise des Distilleries de l'Indochine, which built a building to serve as its office, and later to the Department of Industrial Works, whose lease expired in 1994. In a 1925 map, four buildings are shown to have been built on the former grounds of Wat Kaeo Fa, which was still extant in a map from 1907, indicating that the buildings were built sometime in between. Ownership of the land was transferred to the Crown Property Bureau in 1958.

== Places ==
Today, Captain Bush Lane is home to the Portuguese Embassy, the Royal Orchid Sheraton Hotel (on the former site of the Hongkong and Shanghai Bank), as well as several arts and antique shops. House No. 1 (the former French Distillery Company office) and a warehouse of the Louis T. Leonowens Company, now opposite the hotel, are the two remaining historical structures. The Si Phraya Pier is also in the area. A bridge crossing Khlong Phadung Krung Kasem where the lane meets the end of Si Phaya Road links it to the adjacent neighbourhood of Talat Noi.

=== Portuguese Embassy ===
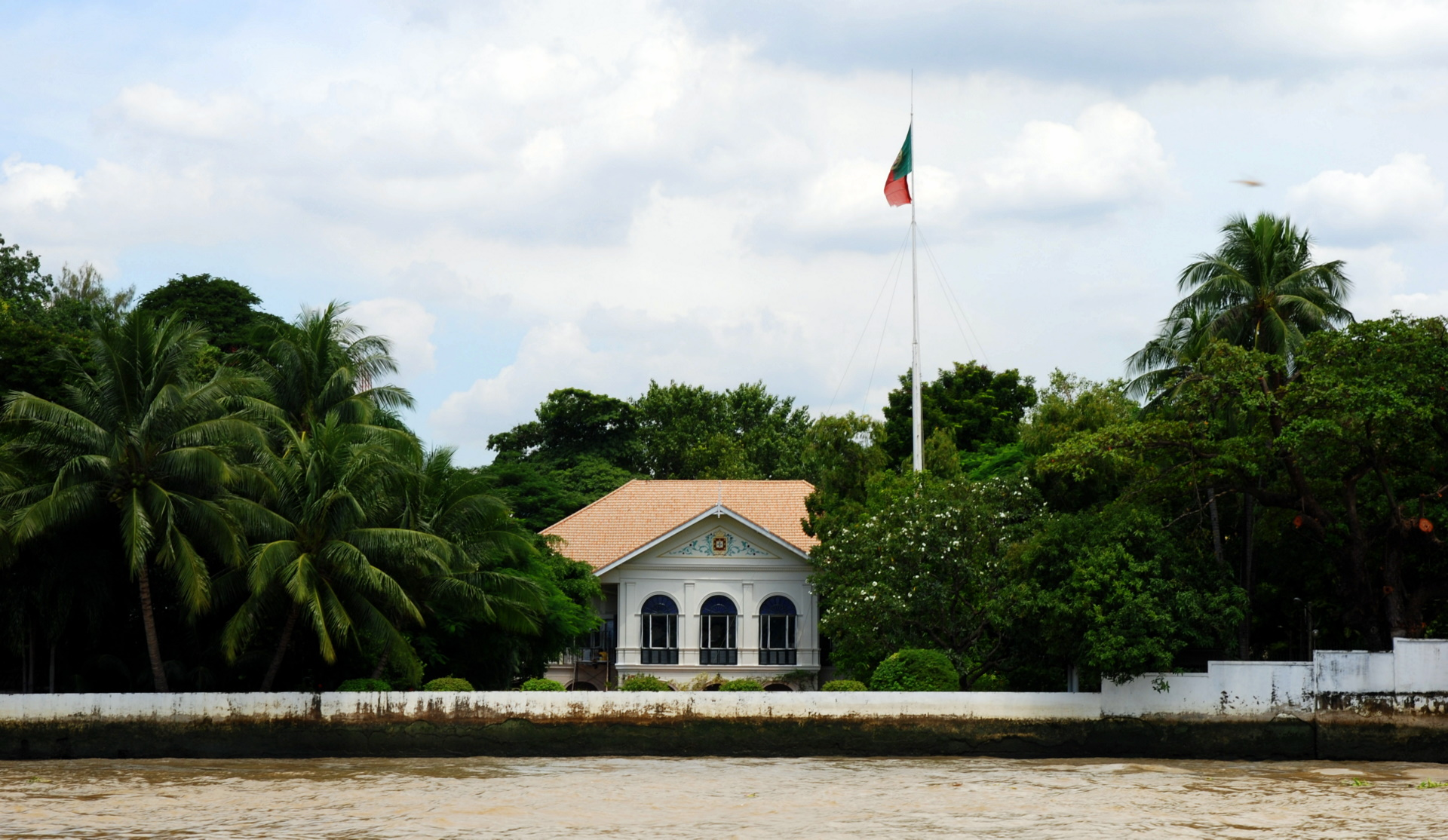
The Portuguese embassy viewed from the river

The Portuguese embassy was first established at this site in 1820 as a factory (trading post), on land granted by King Rama II. It is the oldest diplomatic residence in Thailand. The current embassy and ambassador's residence date from 1860.

=== Hongkong and Shanghai Banking Corporation ===
The Hongkong and Shanghai Bank was the first bank to operate in Siam, first opening in 1888 within the old Customs House building. In 1890, it relocated to a permanent office on the mouth of Khlong Phadung Krung Kasem. The building, built of masonry and three storeys high, was designed by Italian architect Joachim Grassi in the Palladian style. It served as the bank's headquarters for the next 87 years until it was demolished to make way for the Royal Orchid Sheraton Hotel.

=== United Club ===
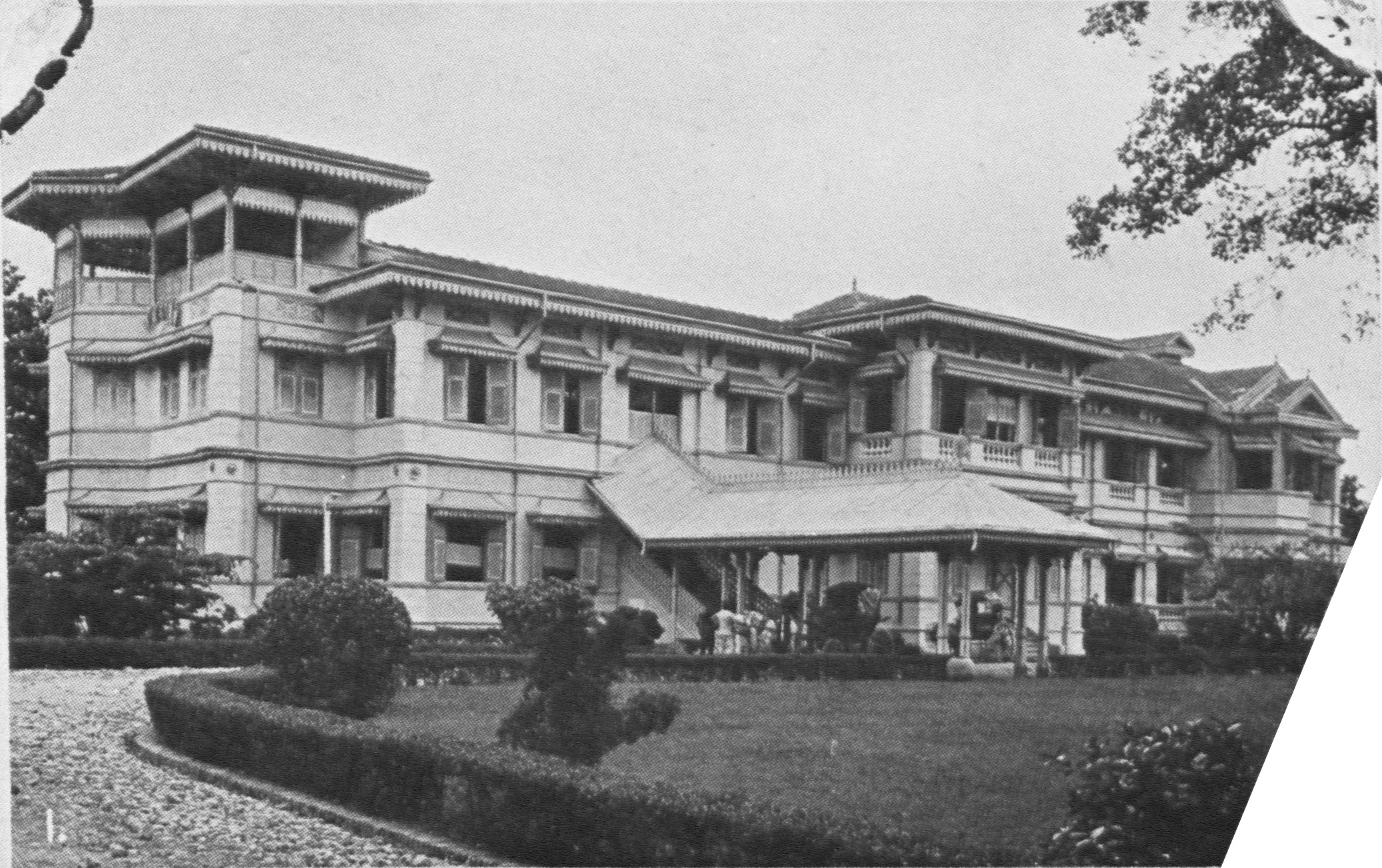
The United Club, c. 1908

The United Club was founded in 1888 as an international social club for Western expatriates, and its members included British, German, French, and American nationals. According to Twentieth Century Impressions of Siam, a reference book published in 1908, "The United Club ... may perhaps be considered the most popular resort for foreign residents in Bangkok." The club was described as occupying large premises, including well laid-out grounds, on the corner of Charoen Krung and Si Phraya Roads (the latter having been built in front of the property in 1906). With a membership of 225 in 1908, the club's facilities included dining, reading, card and billiard rooms, as well as a bowling alley and several tennis courts.

=== House No. 1 ===
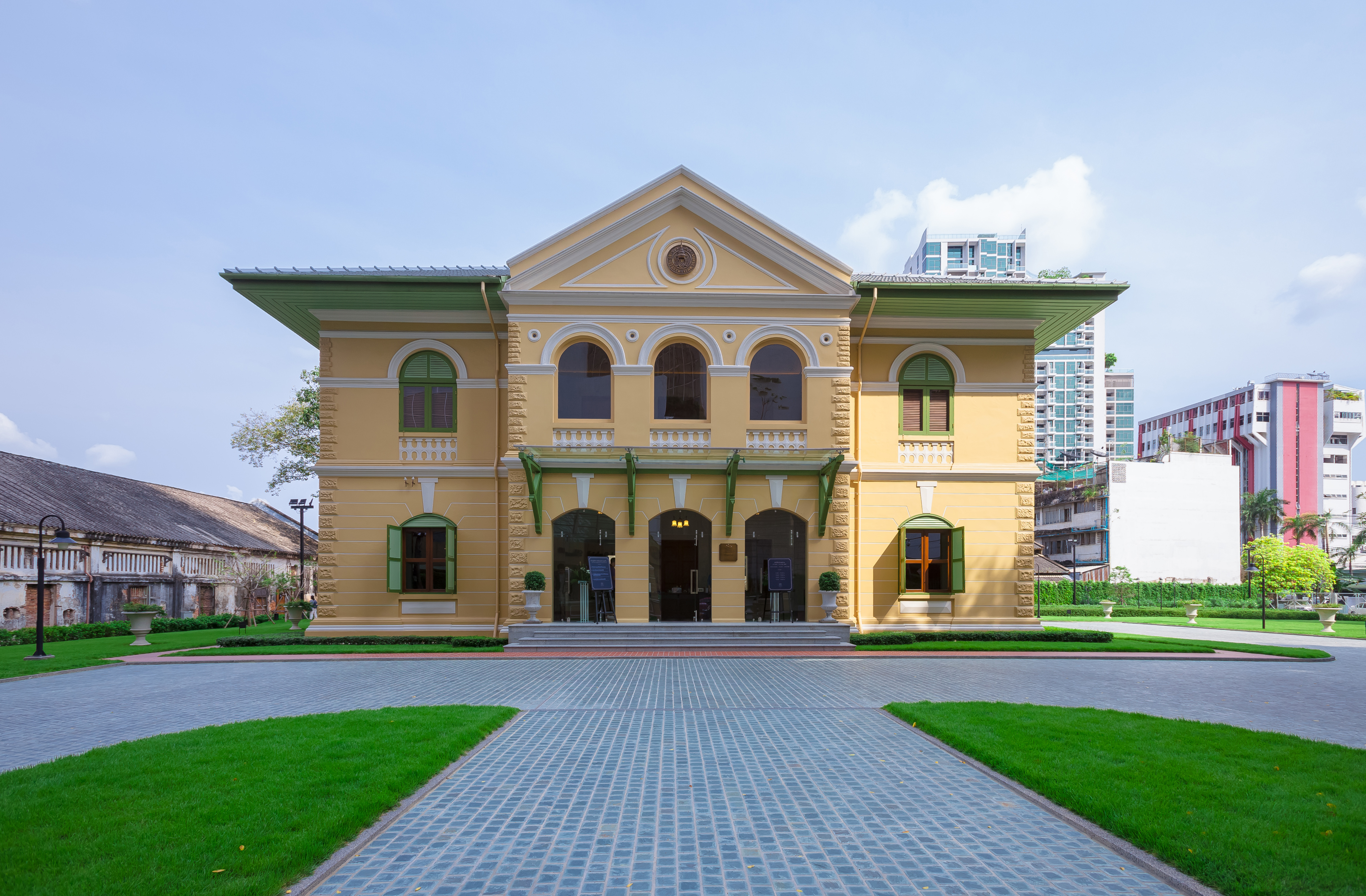
House No. 1 in 2018

House No. 1 is the former office of the Societe Francaise des Distilleries de l'Indochine. The building, built of masonry with load-bearing walls, is built in neoclassical style, with a central pediment at the front. It has two storeys; the lower floor is laid with tiles and the upper floor with teak. The hipped roof is covered with diamond-shaped tiles on a timber frame. Built sometime between 1907 and 1925, it had fallen into disrepair when it underwent extensive restoration in 2012–2016, commissioned by the Crown Property Bureau. The building is listed as an unregistered ancient monument by the Department of Fine Arts.

=== Louis T. Leonowens warehouse ===
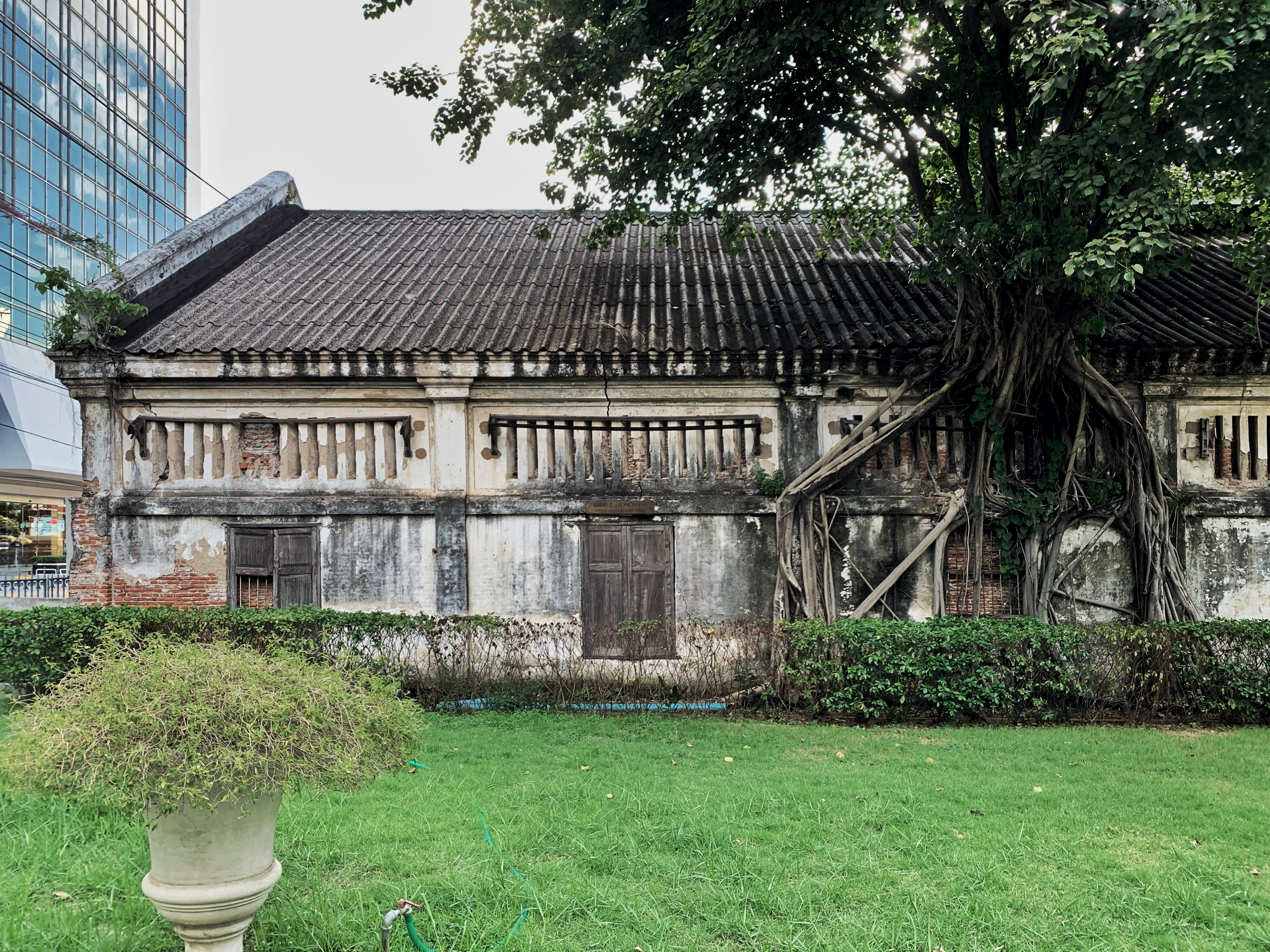
The Louis T. Leonowens warehouse remains as of 2021

A warehouse, next to House No. 1, is the only remaining structure of the Louis T. Leonowens Company. It was probably built between 1907 and 1913, with later additions. It is a one-storey elongated rectangular building with load-bearing walls supporting a high gabled roof of corrugated metal sheets on a large timber frame. Built in vernacular style, it was later modified to house cheap rental rooms. The building is badly deteriorated, though there have been proposals for its conservation.

=== Si Phraya Pier ===
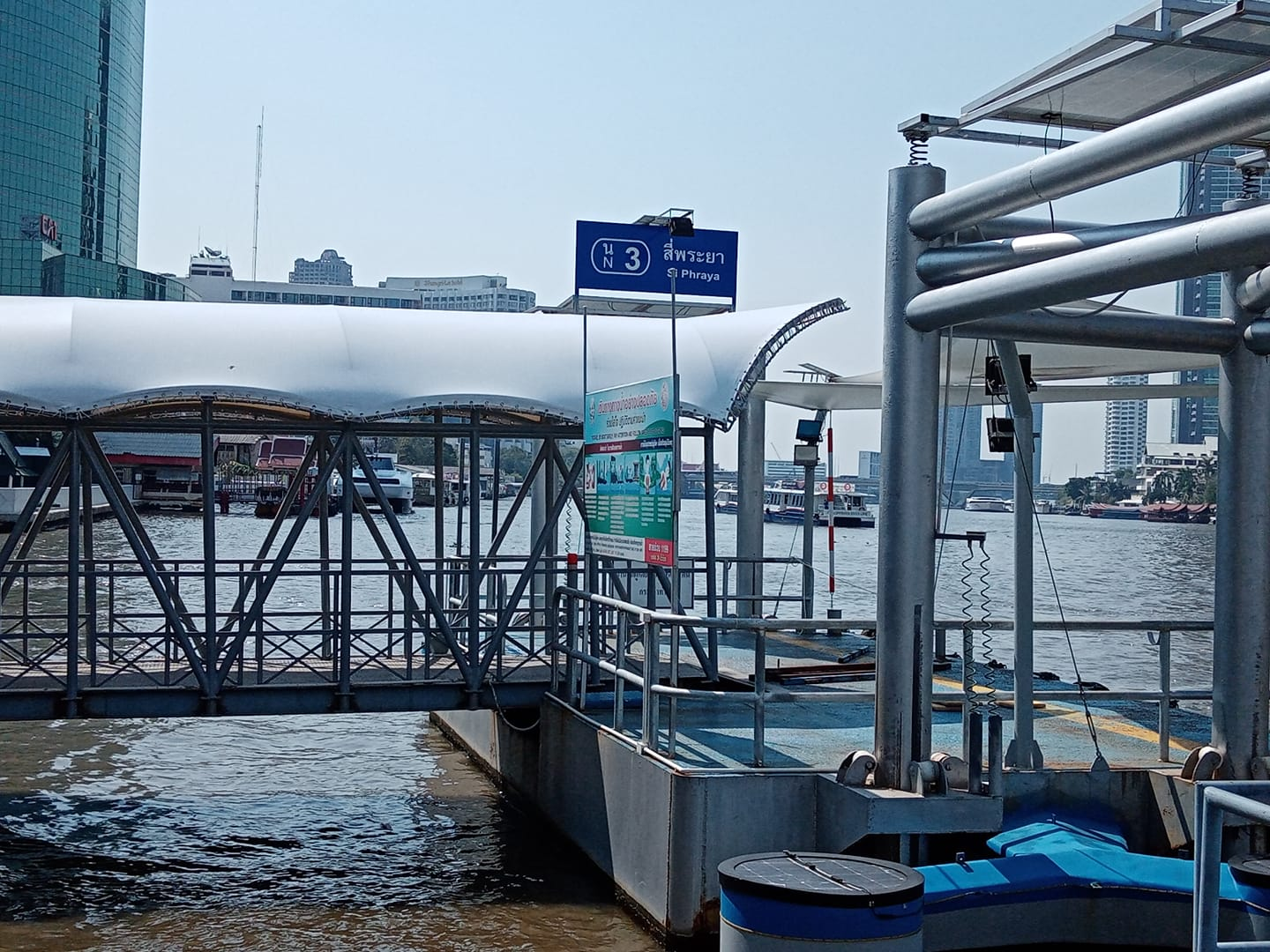
Si Phraya Pier (express boat pier)

Si Phraya Pier serves the Chao Phraya Express Boat and river-crossing ferries to Khlong San Pier and to Iconsiam. The express boat pier, designated N3, is between the Portuguese Embassy and the Royal Orchid Sheraton, while the ferry pier is between the hotel and the River City Shopping Complex in Talat Noi. They are approximately 200 m (about 656 ft) apart. The ferry pier is open from 05:30 to 24:00. Si Phraya Pier was renovated at the end of 2015 by the Marine Department, as part of a project to refurbish seventeen public piers on the Chao Phraya.
