= Talunan =

Filipino chicken soup or stew

- Alternative names: Talunan na manok; Chicken talunan; Talunang manok
- Type: Soup or stew
- Course: Main course
- Place of origin: Philippines
- Region or state: Tagalog
- Serving temperature: Hot
- Main ingredients: Meat, fish sauce, onions, vinegar, tomatoes

Talunan or talonan is a Filipino chicken soup or stew characterized by its sour flavor. It is prepared like a combination of Philippine adobo and paksiw, with vinegar, garlic, ginger, black peppercorns, patis (fish sauce), bay leaves, and salt. Some recipes add pork to the dish. The name literally means "loser" in Tagalog, as it was traditionally cooked from the tough meat of losing roosters used in cockfighting.

== See also ==
- List of soups
