= Binagoongan =

Filipino cooking process

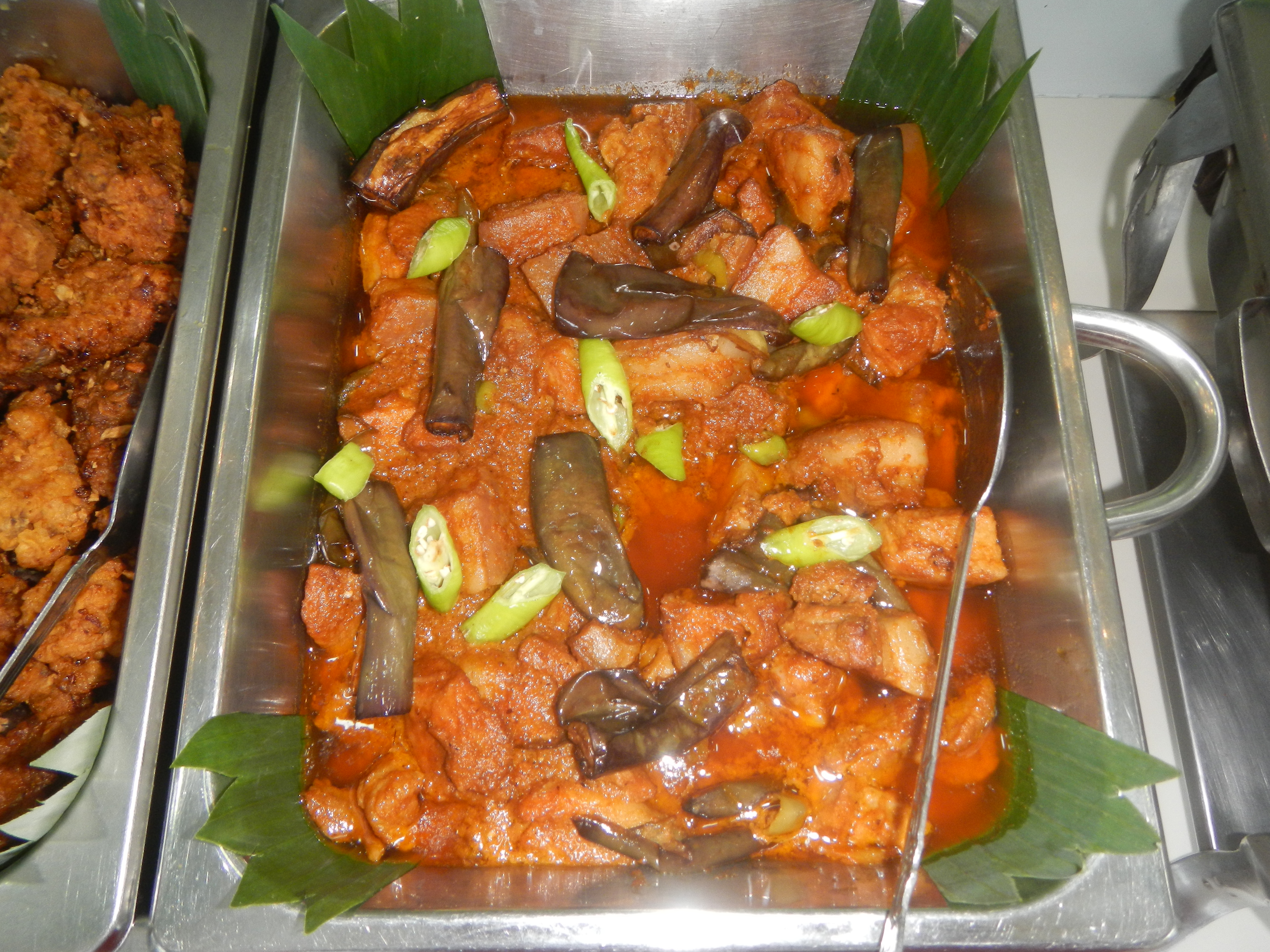
- Binagoongang baboy with fried eggplants
- Course: Main dish
- Place of origin: Pampanga, Philippines
- Serving temperature: Hot
- Similar dishes: Pinatisan, Bicol express, laing, Philippine adobo

Binagoongan is a Filipino cooking process consisting of vegetables (most notably water spinach) or meat (usually pork, but can also be chicken or beef) sautéed or braised in bagoong alamang (shrimp paste), garlic, black peppercorns, and bay leaves. Some recipes also add pineapples, chilis, or coconut cream to balance the flavors. The dish is characteristically quite salty with a strong umami flavor, which is why it is always paired with white rice and never eaten on its own. It is very similar to pinatisan which is cooked with patis (fish sauce), one of the by-products of fermenting bagoong.

== See also ==
- Ginataan
- Kinilnat
- Piaparan
