= Pinatisan =

Filipino cuisine

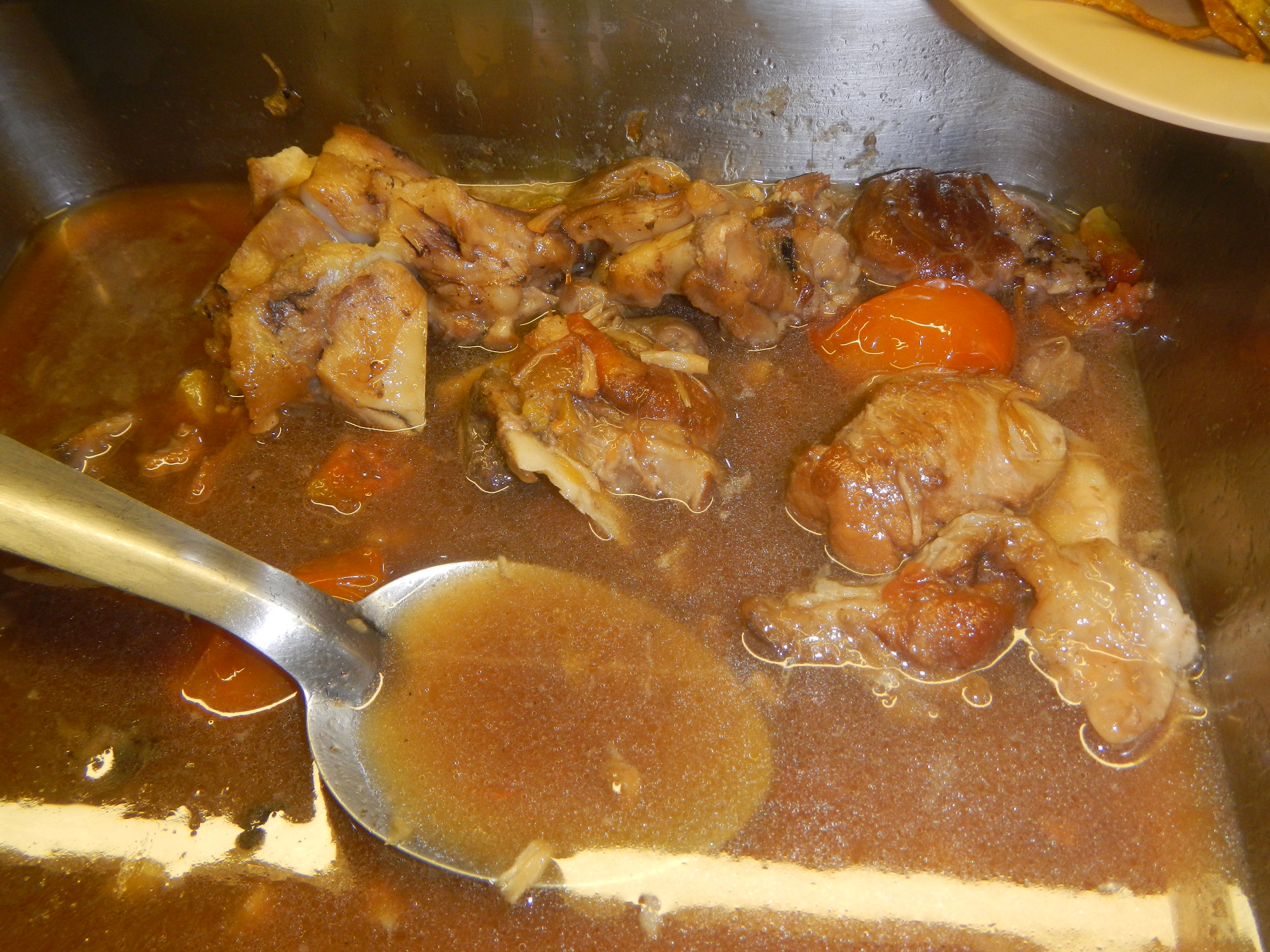
- Pinatisang pata using ham hock
- Course: Main dish
- Place of origin: Philippines
- Serving temperature: hot
- Similar dishes: Binagoongan, Philippine adobo

Pinatisan is a Filipino cooking process consisting of meat (usually chicken, pork, or beef) braised in patis (fish sauce), garlic, ginger, onion, black peppercorns, and bay leaves. Some recipes also add non-traditional ingredients like tomatoes, chili peppers, and other herbs and spices. Vinegar may also be added. It is very similar to binagoongan, which is made using fermented shrimp (bagoong, which are also used to make fish sauce). It is also similar to Philippine adobo and paksiw, but is distinguished by the primary use of fish sauce in place of vinegar (pinatisan literally means "[cooked] with patis"). Pinatisan has a strong umami flavor rather than the characteristic sour and sweet flavor of adobo.

== See also ==
- Piaparan
- Ginataan
