= Shrimp paste =

Fermented condiment

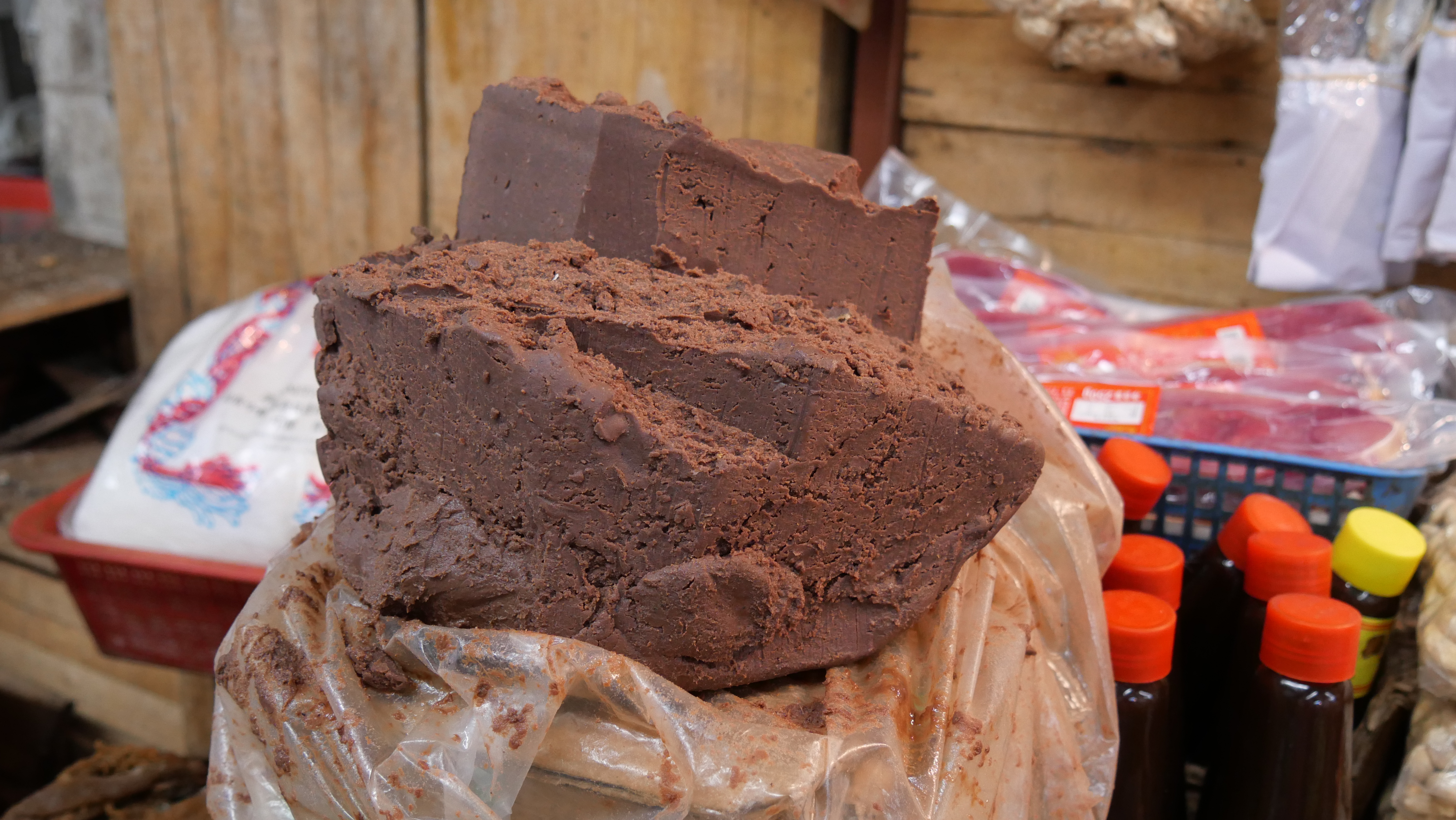
- Shrimp paste at Hop Yick Market in Hong Kong
- Alternative names: Prawn sauce Shrimp sauce (non-solid varieties)
- Type: Condiment
- Place of origin: Continental Southeast Asia
- Region or state: Southeast Asia, Southern China
- Created by: Cham and Mon people
- Main ingredients: shrimp or krill and salt

Shrimp paste

Chinese name
- Traditional Chinese: 蝦醬
- Simplified Chinese: 虾酱
Transcriptions
Standard Mandarin
- Hanyu Pinyin: xiājiàng
Yue: Cantonese
- Jyutping: haa1zoeng3

Alternative Chinese name
- Traditional Chinese: 蝦膎
- Simplified Chinese: 虾膎
Transcriptions
Southern Min
- Hokkien POJ: hê-kê (Taiwanese Hokkien)

Second alternative Chinese name
- Traditional Chinese: 鹹蝦醬
- Simplified Chinese: 咸虾酱
Transcriptions
Yue: Cantonese
- Jyutping: haam4haa1zoeng3 (Cantonese)

Burmese name
- Burmese: ငါးပိ (nga:pi.)

Vietnamese name
- Vietnamese alphabet: mắm tôm
- Hán-Nôm: 𩻐𩵽

Thai name
- Thai: กะปิ
- RTGS: ka-pi

Malay name
- Malay: belacan

Indonesian name
- Indonesian: terasi

Filipino name
- Tagalog: bagoóng alamáng

Lao name
- Lao: ກະປິ (kapi)

Khmer name
- Khmer: កាពិ (kābi)

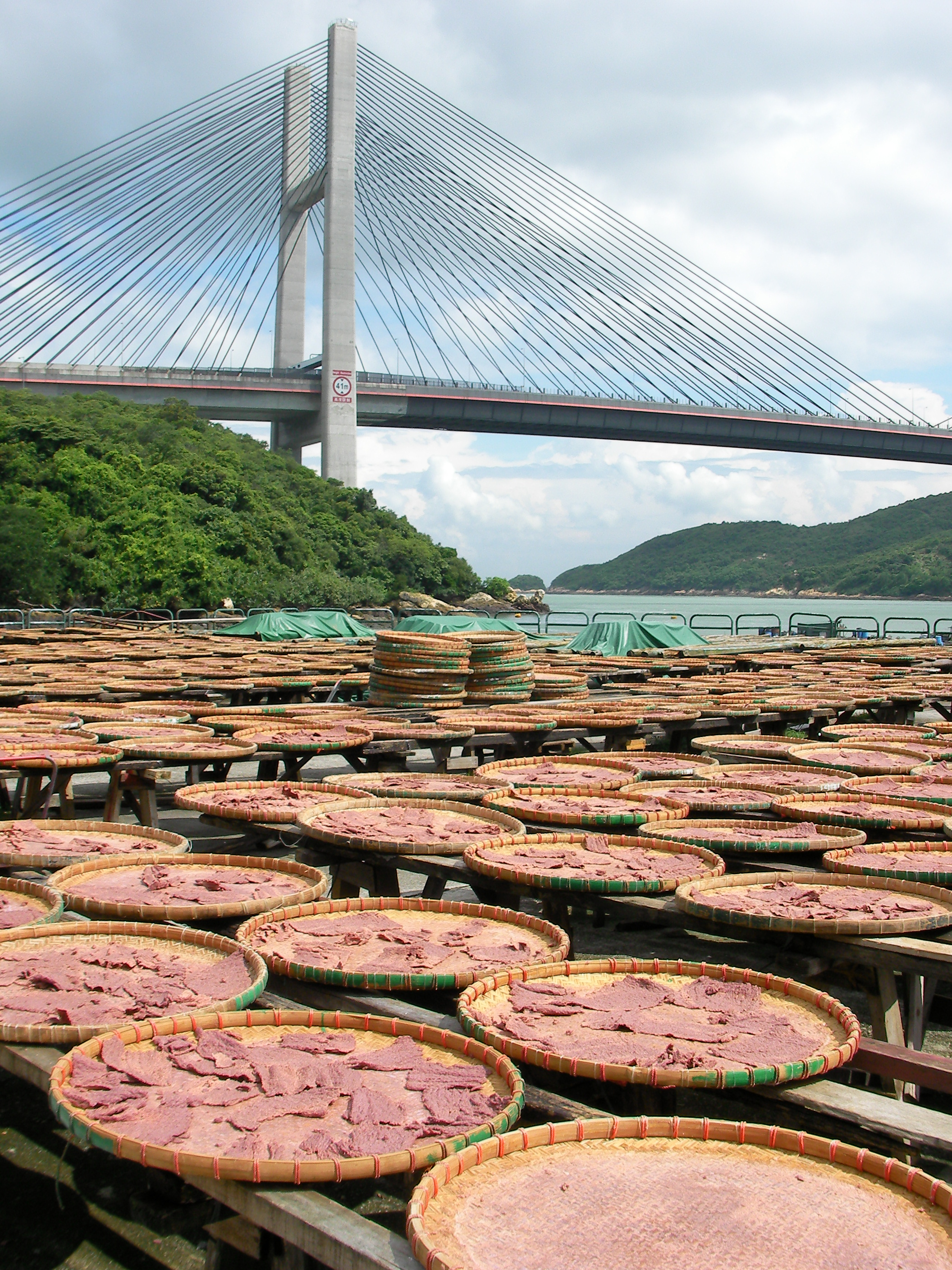
Shrimp paste being dried under the sun in Ma Wan, Hong Kong

Shrimp paste, shrimp sauce, or prawn sauce is a fermented condiment commonly used in Southeast Asian and coastal Chinese cuisines. It is primarily made from finely crushed shrimp or krill mixed with salt, and then fermented for several weeks. Depending on the regional variations, it is sold either in its wet form or sun-dried, and either cut into blocks or sold in bulk. It is an essential ingredient in many curries, sauces and sambal. Shrimp paste can be found in many meals in Cambodia, Indonesia, Laos, Malaysia, Myanmar, the Philippines, Singapore, Thailand, and Vietnam. It is often an ingredient in dip for fish or vegetables.

== History ==
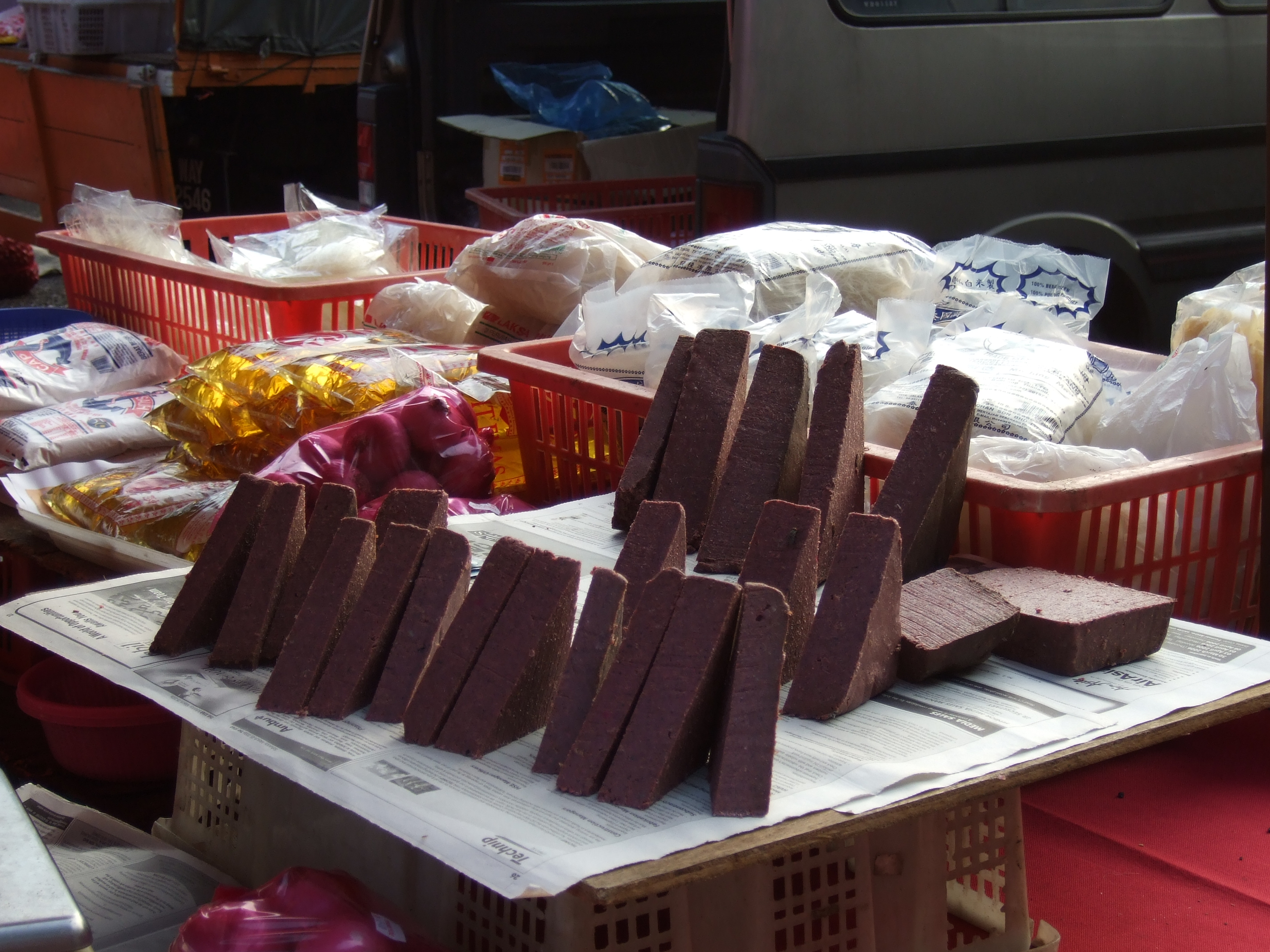
Belacan in a market of Malaysia

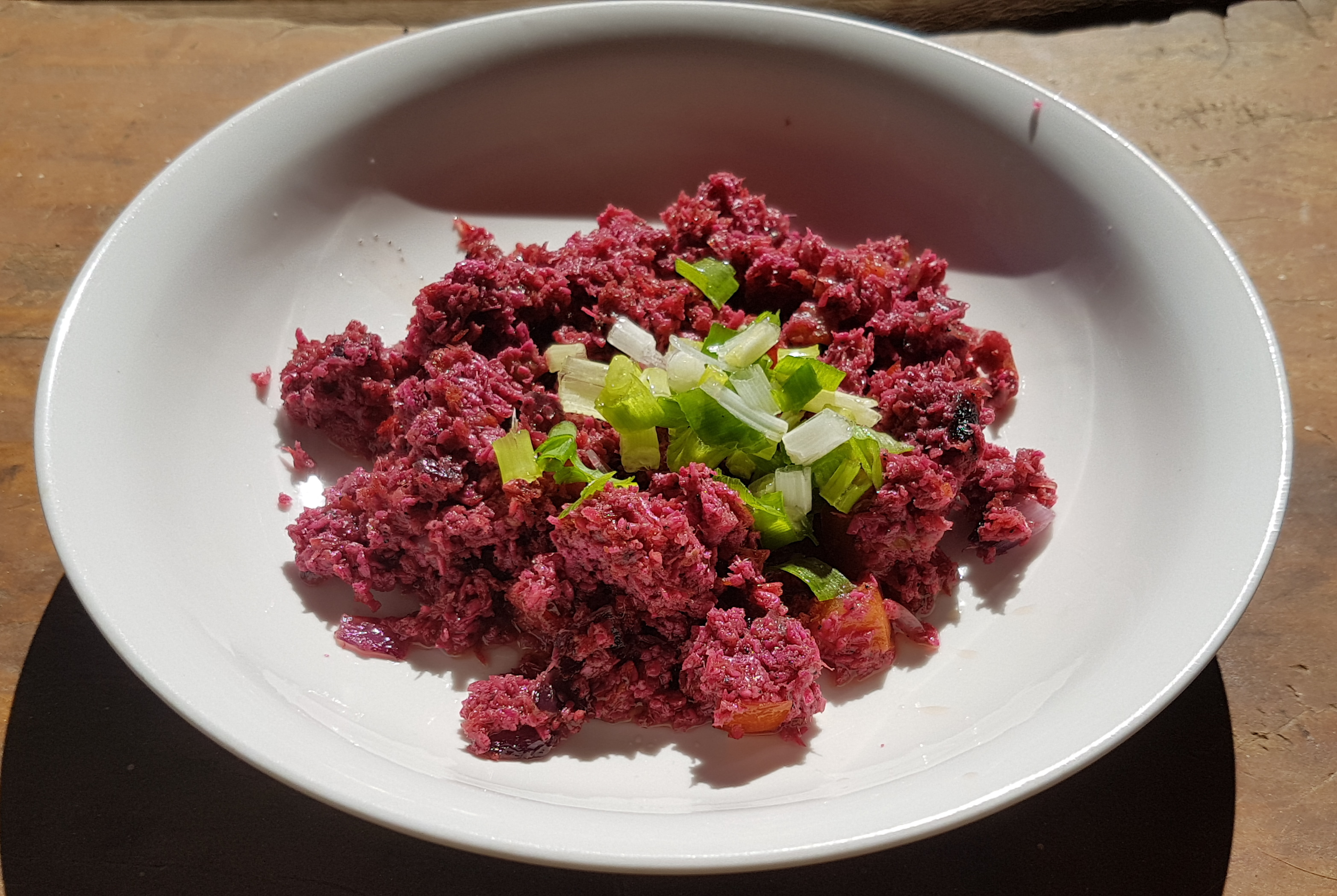
Ginisáng alamáng (sautéed shrimp paste) from the Philippines. It is typically bright red or pink due to the use of angkak (red yeast rice), and the shrimp or krill remains readily identifiable. It is eaten in very small amounts over white rice.

Shrimp paste originated in continental Southeast Asia, probably among the Cham and Mon people, from where it spread southwards to insular Southeast Asia.

In Java, fermented shrimp paste (trasi or terasi), as mentioned in two ancient Sundanese scriptures, Carita Purwaka Caruban Nagari and Mertasinga, had been around before sixth century. According to Carita Purwaka Caruban Nagari, Cirebon had angered the King of Galuh Kingdom after they stopped paying a tribute (in the forms of shrimp paste and salt, their regional products) to him. In Mertasinga, it was mentioned that Cirebon was attacked by Galuh Kingdom because they stopped sending trasi to the king.

Shrimp paste was one of Java's most popular exports bought by traders from neighboring islands and abroad. According to Purwaka Caruban Nagari, Chinese Muslim explorer, Zheng He of Yunnan, used to buy trasi from Cirebon and brought it back to his homeland. He was the one who introduced trasi to China, a foreign condiment which later became popular and inspired locals to make their own version.

In 1707, William Dampier described trasi in his book A New Voyage Round the World: "A composition of a strong odor, but it became a very tasty meal for the indigenous people." Dampier described it further as a mixture of shrimp and small fish made into a kind of soft pickle with salt and water, and then the dough was packed tightly in a clay jar. The pickling process softens the fish and makes it mushy. Then they poured arrack into the jars to preserve them. "The mushy fish remains was called trassi," Dampier wrote; "The aroma is very strong. However, after adding a little part of it, the dish's flavour became quite savory."

In the 1880s, trassi was described by Anna Forbes during her visit to Ambon. Anna was the wife of British naturalist Henry Ogg Forbes; the couple travelled through the Dutch East Indies in the 1880s. In her journal she describes the culture, customs and tradition of the natives, including their culinary tradition. Because of this foul-smelled ingredient, she accused her cook of trying to poison her and threw away that "horrible rotten package". Later she wrote: "Then, I observed each dish of the native or European, those that I have consumed since my arrival in the East contains this; the essence of that rotten stuff that has been used as a spice."

Traditional Kapi is described by Simon de La Loubère, a French diplomat appointed by King Louis XIV to the Royal Court of Siam in 1687. In one chapter, "Concerning the Table of the Siamese" he wrote: "Their sauces are plain, a little water with some spices, garlic, chilbols, or some sweet herb, as baulm. They do much esteem a liquid sauce, like mustard, which is only corrupted crayfish, because they are ill salted; they called it Capi.

== Varieties ==
Shrimp paste may vary in appearance from pale liquid sauces to solid chocolate-coloured blocks. Shrimp paste produced in Hong Kong and Vietnam is typically a light pinkish grey; while the type used for Burmese, Lao, Cambodian, Thai, Indonesian cooking is darker brown. In the Philippines, they are commonly bright red or pink, due to the use of angkák (red yeast rice) as a colouring agent. While all shrimp paste has a pungent aroma, the scent of higher grade shrimp paste is generally milder. Markets near villages producing shrimp paste are the best places to obtain the highest quality product. Shrimp paste varies between different Asian cultures in terms of smell, texture, and saltiness.

=== Bagoóng alamáng ===
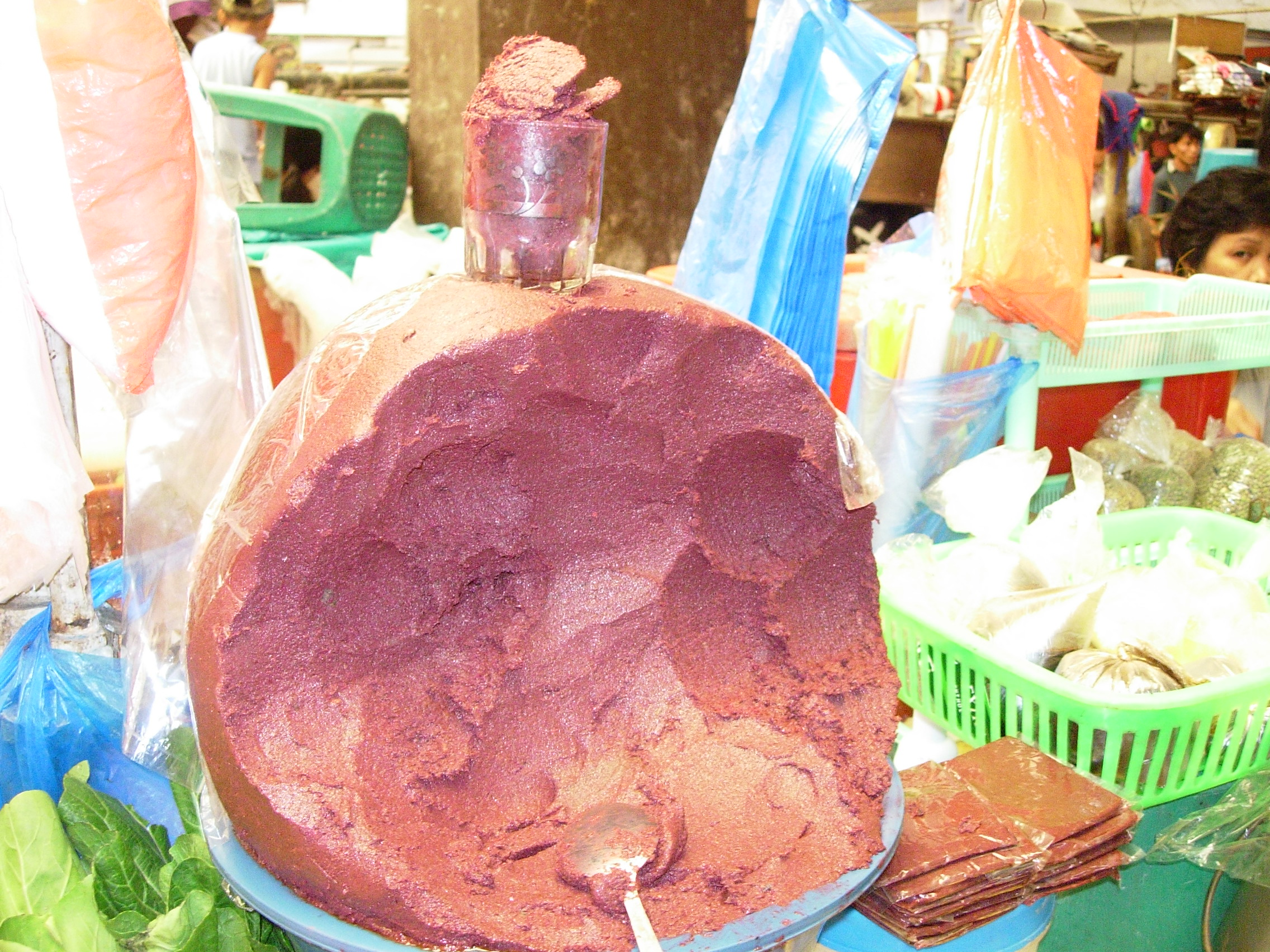
A block of shrimp paste in Dumaguete, Negros Oriental, Philippines

Bagoóng alamáng (also aramáng, uyap, dayok, or ginamós in various Philippine languages) is Filipino for shrimp paste. It is a type of bagoóng, which is a class of fermented seafood in Philippine cuisine (including fermented fish, oysters, and clams) which also produces fish sauce (patís). It is made from the same Acetes shrimp variety used in Indonesian and Malaysian variants (known in Filipino/Tagalog as alamáng) and is commonly eaten as a condiment on green mangoes (also boiled saba bananas or cassava), used as a major cooking ingredient, or sautéed and eaten with white rice. Bagoóng paste varies in appearance, flavour, and spiciness depending on the type. Pink and salty bagoóng alamáng is marketed as "fresh", and is essentially the shrimp-salt mixture left to marinate for a few days. This bagoóng is rarely used in this form, except as a topping for unripe mangoes. The paste is customarily sautéed with various condiments, and its flavour can range from salty to spicy-sweet. The colour of the sauce will also vary with the cooking time and the ingredients used in sautéing.

Unlike in other parts of Southeast Asia, the Sulu Archipelago, Western Visayas and the Bicolandia in southeastern Luzon, where the shrimp is fermented beyond recognition or ground to a smooth consistency, the shrimp in bagoóng alamáng in many parts of the Philippines is still identifiable, the sauce itself having a chunky consistency. A small amount of cooked or sautéed bagoóng is served as the side condiment of kare-kare, an oxtail stew made with ground peanuts. It is also the key flavouring agent of binagoongan (lit. "that to which bagoóng is applied"), a pork dish.

The word bagoóng also refers to the sauce made with the bonnet mouth and anchovy fish, known as bagoóng terong.

==== Burong Hipon ====
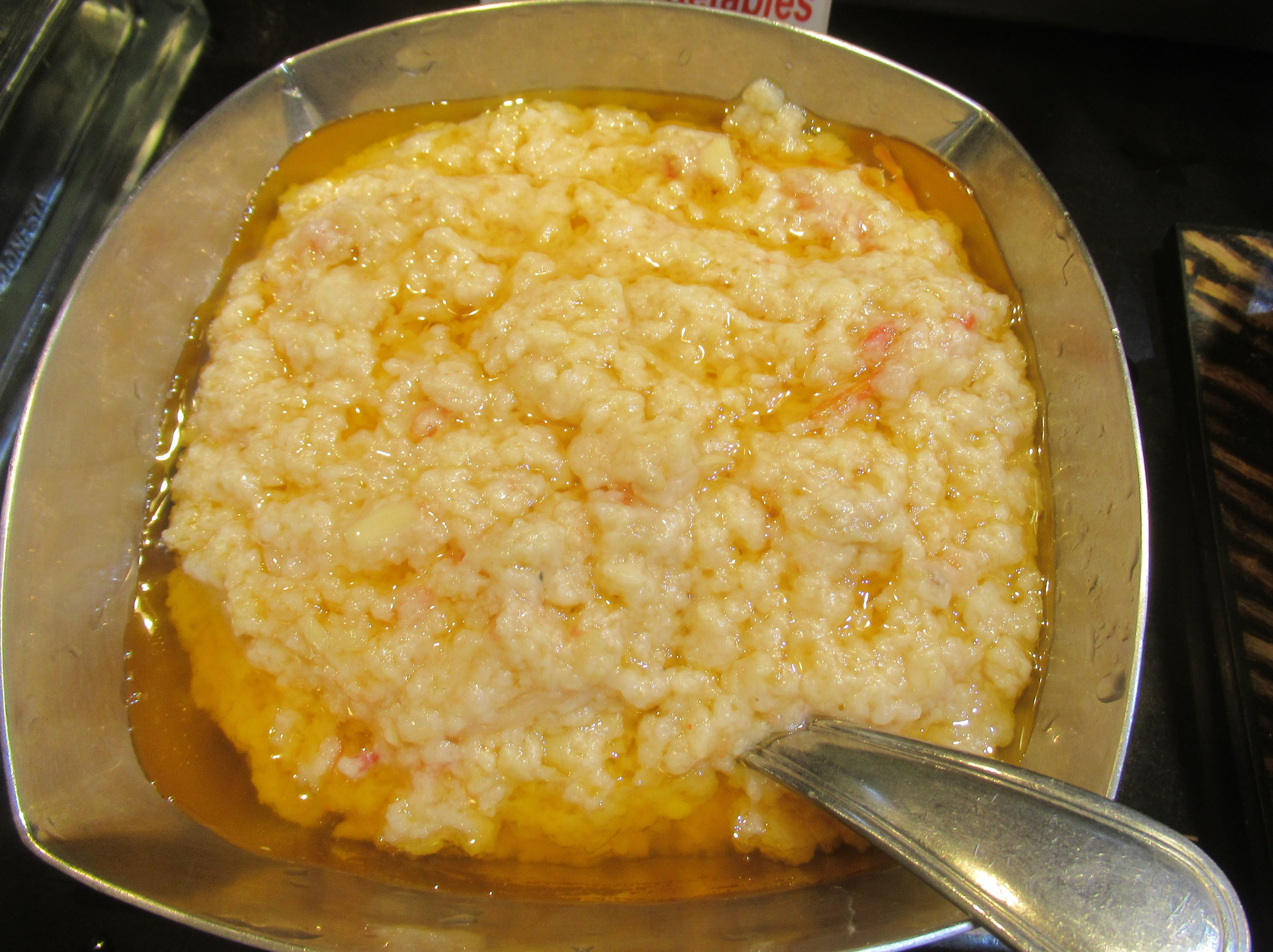
Burong Hipon

Balao-balao, also called burong hipon, is a type of shrimp paste used in Kapampangan cuisine.

=== Belacan ===
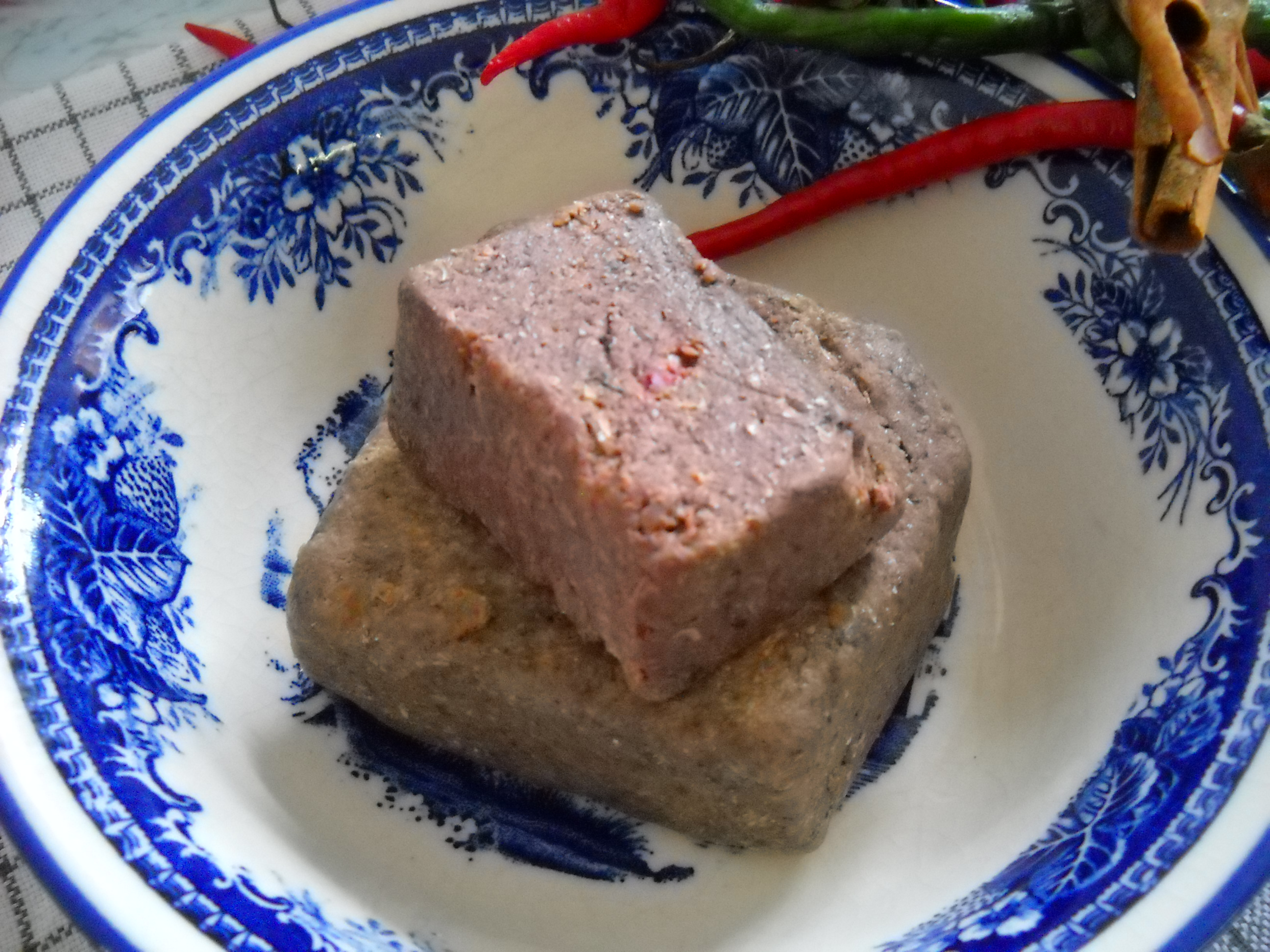
Sticks of belacan produced in Bangka Island, Indonesia

Belacan, a Malay variety of shrimp paste, is prepared from small shrimp from the Acetes species, known as geragau in Malaysia or rebon in Indonesia. In Malaysia, the krill are typically steamed first, then mashed into a paste, and kept in storage for several months. The fermented shrimp are then prepared, fried and hard-pressed into cakes. William Marsden, an English writer, included the word in his "A Dictionary of the Malayan Language" published in 1812.

Belacan is used as an ingredient in many dishes. A common preparation is sambal belacan, made by mixing toasted belacan with chilli peppers, minced garlic, shallot paste and sugar and then fried. Sometimes it is toasted to bring out the flavour, usually creating a strong, distinctive odour.

In Northern Australia, a variant of sambal belacan is known locally as blachan or blachung (a phonetic spelling of the Indonesian pronunciation), and is popularly prepared among Indigenous and Torres Strait Islander families in Broome, Darwin and Cairns. Its presence is credited to the influence of early Makassan traders.

A version of belacan similar to Filipino "fresh" bagoong alamang shrimp paste (which is fermented for a shorter period) is known as cincalok.

In Sri Lanka, belacan is a key ingredient used to make Lamprais.

=== Balchao ===
Galmbo are dried baby shrimps which are ground with dried red chillies, spices and palm vinegar to make a spice paste used in the sour, sweet and spicy sauce known as balchao in Goa, India. It was brought to Goa by the Portuguese and originated in Macau. It is more like a pickle and is used as a side condiment in small quantities.

=== Haam ha ===
Haam ha (Chinese: 鹹蝦; Cantonese Yale: hàahm hā; pinyin: xiánxiā), alternatively spelled "hom ha", also known as har cheong (Chinese: 蝦醬; Cantonese Yale: hā jeung; pinyin: xiājiàng), is a finely ground shrimp paste popular in southeastern Chinese cooking and a staple seasoning in many places Cantonese people settled. It is lighter in colour compared to shrimp pastes made farther south. It is considered indispensable in many pork, seafood, and vegetable stir fry dishes. The smell and flavor are very strong. A pearl-sized ball of haam ha is enough to season a stir fry for two people. The shrimp paste industry has historically been important in the Hong Kong and Macau region, and Hong Kong factories continue to ship haam ha to communities around the world.

=== Kapi ===
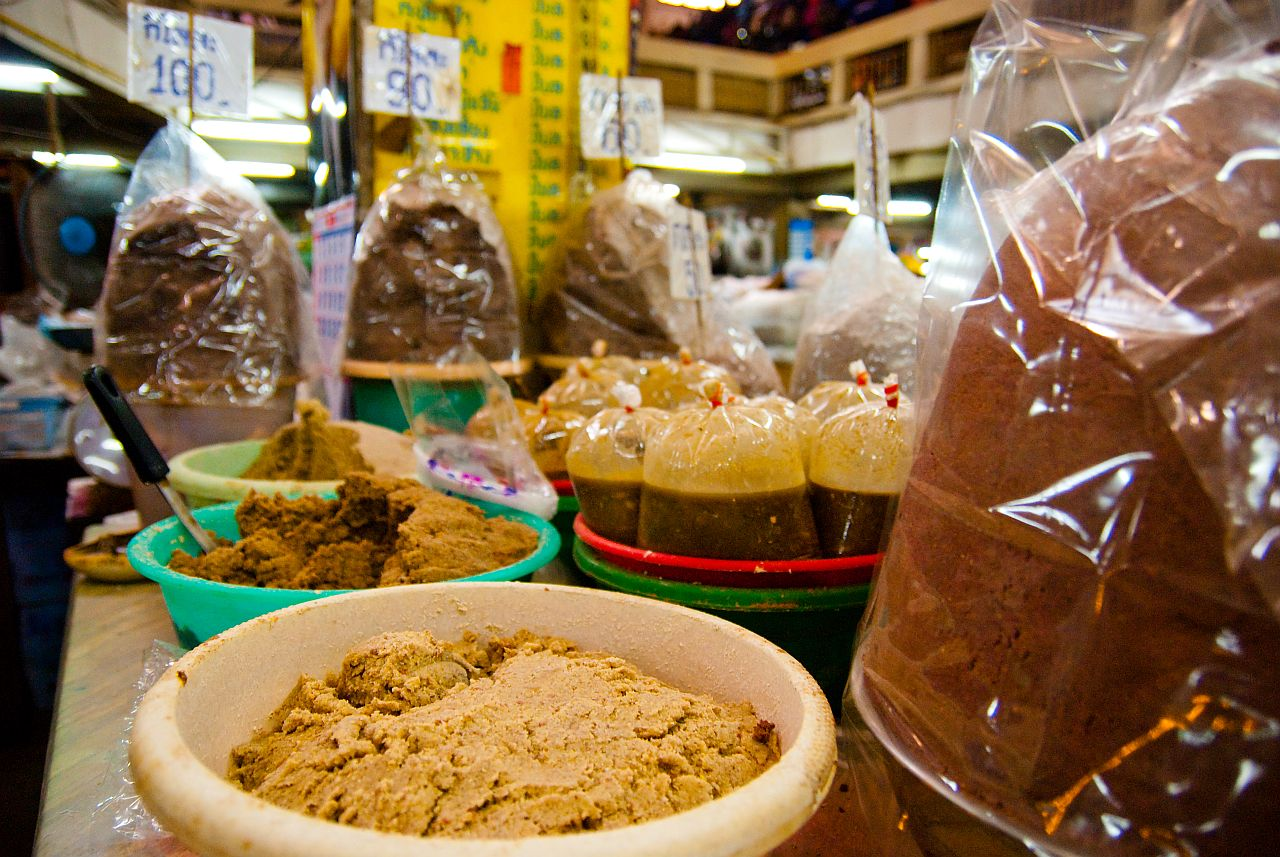
Baskets and mounds of Thai shrimp paste (kapi) at Warorot market, Chiang Mai, Thailand

In Thailand, shrimp paste is called kapi (Thai: กะปิ); (Lao: ກະປິ). Kapi is an essential ingredient in many types of nam phrik, spicy dips or sauces, and in all Thai curry pastes, such as the paste used in kaeng som. Very popular in Thailand is nam phrik kapi, a spicy condiment made with fresh shrimp paste and most often eaten together with fried pla thu (short mackerel) and fried, steamed or raw vegetables. In Southern Thailand, there are three types of shrimp paste: one made only from shrimp, one containing a mixture of shrimp and fish ingredients, and another paste that is sweet. Nam phrik maeng da is available in Hat Yai and Satun markets. The carcass of the giant water bug (maeng da) is crushed and mixed with kapi, releasing an aromatic fragrance, often noted as resembling licorice. Nam phrik makham is kapi mixed with tamarind (makham) and is more sour.

Another common Thai food product is mun kung, which is confusingly also commonly translated as "shrimp paste". Mun kung is orange, oily, and more liquid while kapi is grey, light purple or even black, and much more solid and crumbly. Mun kung is actually the fat from inside the head of the shrimp, from the organ that plays the role of the liver and pancreas, making it somewhat like a shrimp pâté or foie gras. The term "shrimp tomalley" may also be used for man kung although "tomalley" by default is generally assumed to be harvested from lobster or crab, and may also be used in English translations of the culinary extremely different Japanese food product kanimiso.

=== Mắm tôm ===
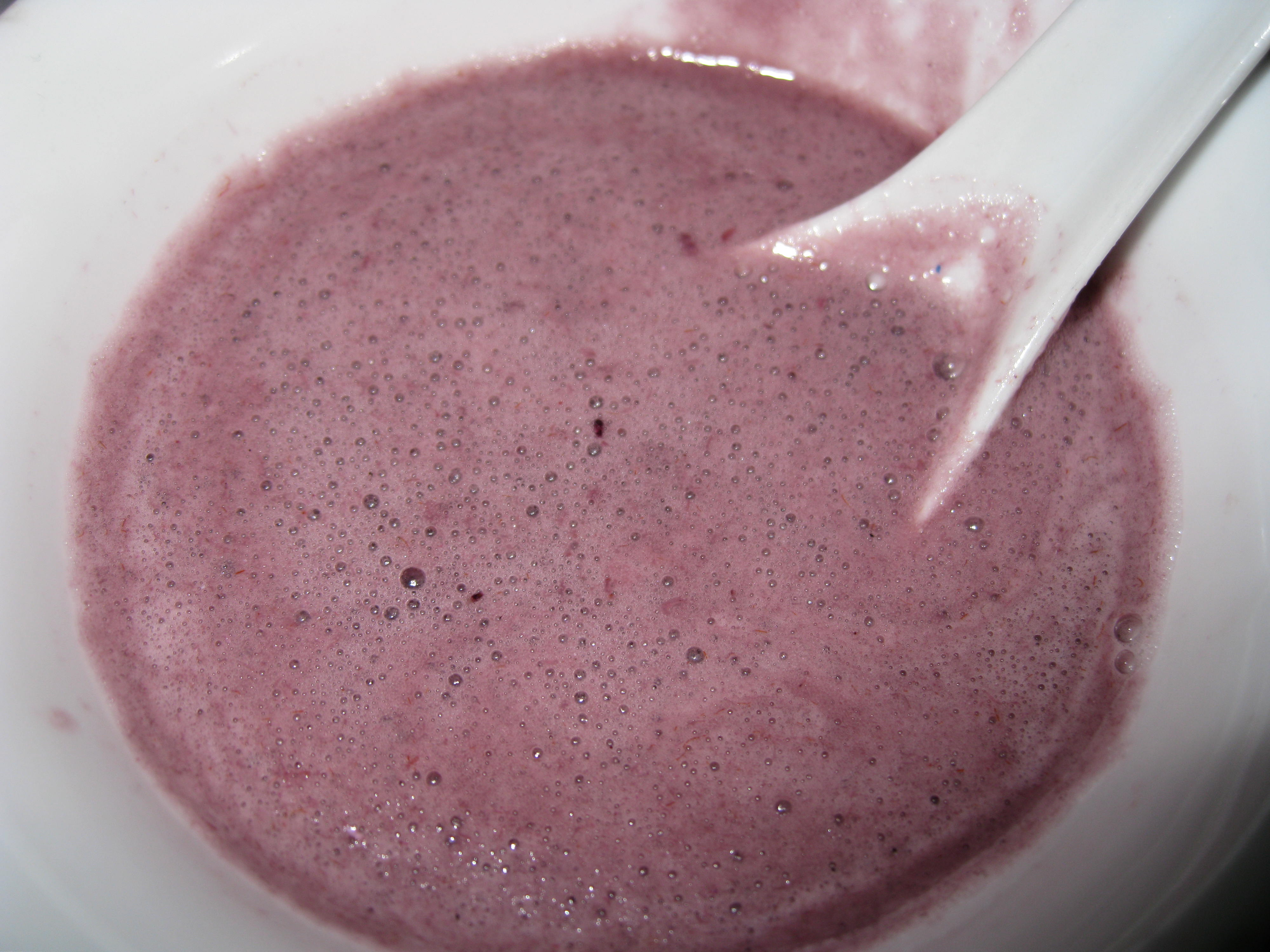
Vietnamese mắm tôm (shrimp paste)

In Vietnam, shrimp paste (mắm tôm, IPA: [mam˧˦ tom˧]) are of two varieties: a thickened paste or a more liquefied sauce. To prepare for serving it is usually mixed with sugar, lime juice, kumquat and chili when used as a dipping sauce. Vietnamese people often use mắm tôm as a dipping sauce for boiled meat, fried tofu, fried fish or for seasoning some soup dishes, such as bún riêu.

=== Ngapi yay ===
A watery dip or condiment that is very popular in Myanmar, especially the Burmese and Karen ethnic groups. The ngapi (either fish or shrimp, but mostly whole fish ngapi is used) is boiled with onions, tomato, garlic, pepper and other spices. The result is a greenish-grey broth-like sauce, which makes its way to every Burmese dining table. Fresh, raw or blanched vegetables and fruits (such as mint, cabbage, tomatoes, green mangoes, green apples, olives, chilli, onions and garlic) are dipped into the ngapi yay and eaten. Sometimes, in less affluent families, ngapi yay forms the main dish, and also the main source of protein.

=== Petis udang ===
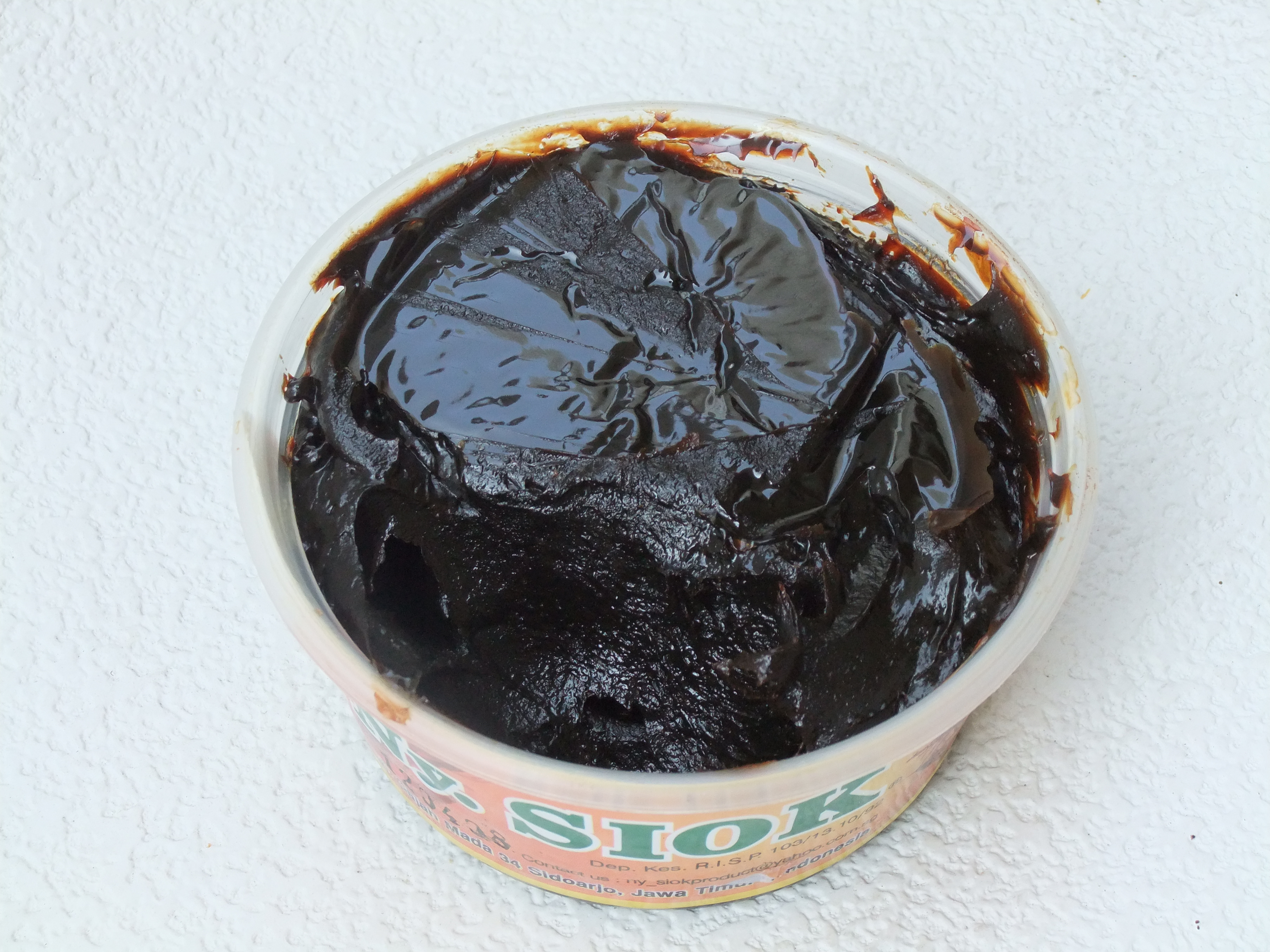
Molasses-like consistency of black petis udang, produced in Sidoarjo, East Java, Indonesia

Petis udang is a version of shrimp/prawn paste used in Indonesia, Malaysia and Singapore. In Indonesia it is particularly popular in East Java. This thick black paste has a molasses like consistency instead of the hard brick like appearance of belacan. It also tastes sweeter because of the added sugar. Petis is produced by boiling down the slurry of leftovers from shrimp processing. Molasses is generally added to provide a sweet flavour to the petis. It is used to flavour common local street foods like popiah spring rolls, Asam laksa, chee cheong fan rice rolls and rojak salads, such as rujak cingur and rujak petis. In Indonesia, major producer of petis are home industries in Sidoarjo, Pasuruan and Gresik area in East Java.

=== Sidol ===
In the Chittagong Hill Tracts, Bangladesh, shrimp paste is called sidol or nappi by the indigenous Jumma people. They use it to make vegetable food, such as bamboo shoot curry. First bamboo shoots are collected from the bamboo forest, then defoliated and boiled in water. The boiling water is then mixed with the shrimp paste. Chili, garlic paste, salt, and flour are added to the shrimp paste–water mix. The mixture is heated, and after a few minutes, the food is ready to serve.

=== Terasi ===
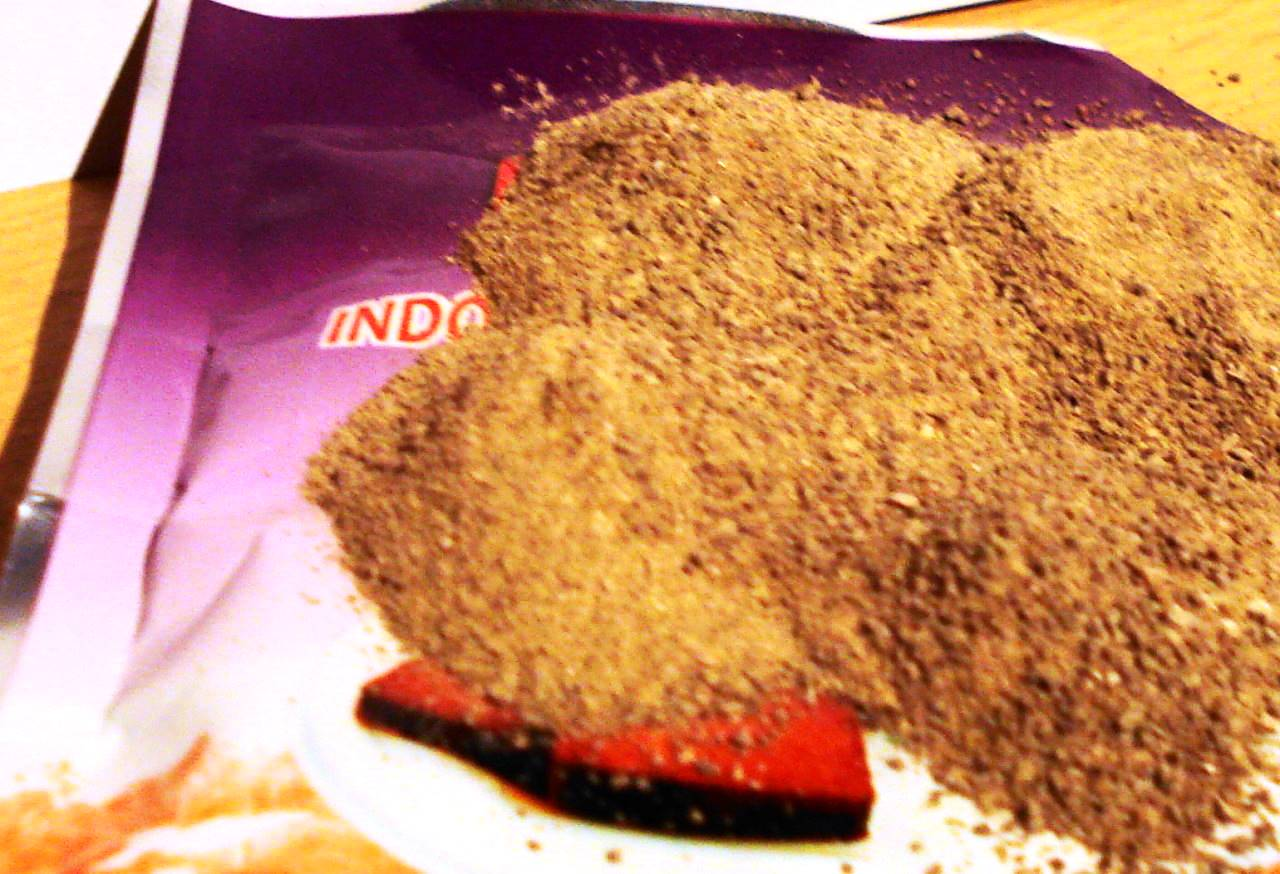
Powdered ground trassi in the Netherlands

Terasi (Dutch: trassi, Javanese: ꦠꦿꦱꦶ, romanized: trasi), an Indonesian (especially Javanese) variant of dried shrimp paste, is usually purchased in dark blocks, but is also sometimes sold ground as granulated coarse powder. The colour and aroma of terasi varies depending on which village produced it. The colour ranges from a soft purple-reddish hue to darkish brown. In Cirebon, a coastal city in West Java, terasi is made from tiny shrimp (Acetes) called rebon, the origin of the city's name. Another kind is petis made from shrimp or tuna mixed with palm sugar. In Sidoarjo, East Java, terasi is made from the mixture of ingredients such as fish, small shrimp (udang), and vegetables. Terasi is an important ingredient in sambal terasi, also many other Indonesian cuisine, such as sayur asem (vegetable soup with tamarind), lotek (also called gado-gado, Indonesian style salad in peanut sauce), karedok (similar to lotek, but the vegetables are served raw), and rujak (Indonesian style hot and spicy fruit salad).

On the island of Lombok, Indonesia, a more savoury and sweet shrimp paste called lengkare is made.

== Industry ==
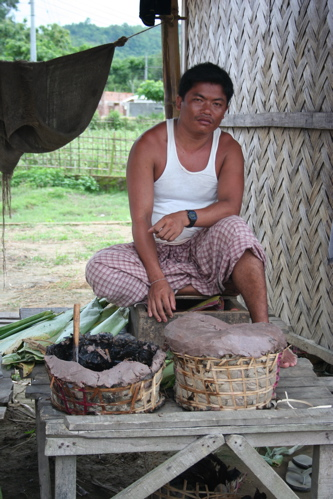
A vendor selling shrimp paste

Shrimp paste continues to be made by fishing families in coastal villages. They sell it to vendors, middlemen, or distributors who package it for resale to consumers. Shrimp paste is often known for the region it comes from since production techniques and quality vary from village to village. Some coastal regions in Indonesia, such as Bagansiapiapi in Riau, Indramayu, Cirebon in West Java, and Sidoarjo in East Java; as well as villages such as Pulau Betong in Malaysia, Ma Wan island in Hong Kong and in Lingayen Gulf, Pangasinan in the Philippines are well known for producing very fine-quality shrimp paste.

== Preparation ==
Preparation techniques can vary greatly; however, the following procedure is most common in China, and much of Southeast Asia.

After being caught, small shrimp are unloaded, rinsed and drained before being dried. Drying can be done on plastic mats on the ground in the sun, on metal beds on low stilts, or using other methods. After several days, the shrimp-salt mixture will darken and turn into a thick pulp. If the shrimp used to produce the paste were small, it is ready to be served as soon as the individual shrimp have broken-down beyond recognition. If the shrimp are larger, fermentation will take longer and the pulp will be ground to provide a smoother consistency. The fermentation/grinding process is usually repeated several times until the paste fully matures. The paste is then dried and cut into bricks by the villagers to be sold. Dried shrimp paste does not require refrigeration.

== Availability ==
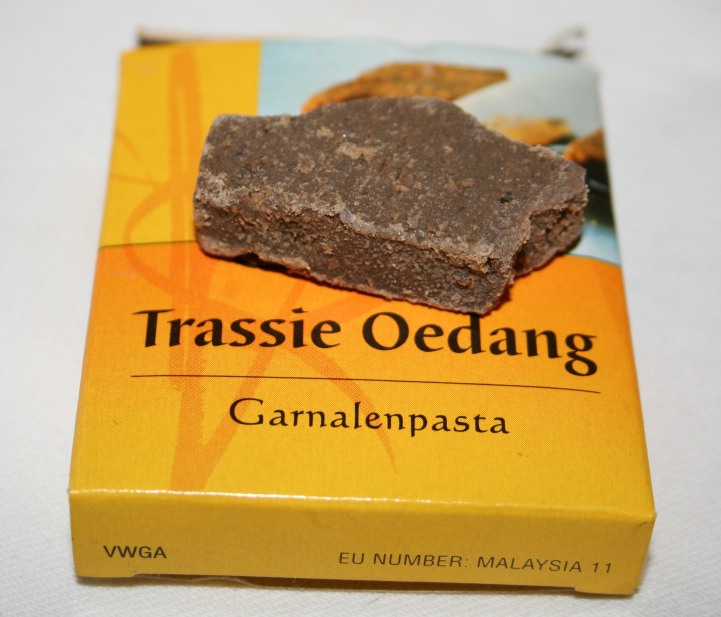
Trassi udang, as bought in a Dutch supermarket

Shrimp paste can be found in nations outside Southeast Asia in markets catering to Asian customers. In the Netherlands, Indonesian-style shrimp paste can be found in supermarkets selling Asian foods, such as Trassie Oedang from the Conimex brand. In the United States, brands of Thai shrimp paste such as Pantainorasingh and Tra Chang can be found. Shrimp pastes from other countries are also available in Asian supermarkets and through mail order. It is also readily available in Suriname due to the high concentration of Javanese inhabitants. In Australia, shrimp paste can be found in most suburbs where Southeast Asian people reside.

== See also ==
- Bagoong monamon – Philippine food ingredient made by fermenting salted anchovies
- Budu – Fish sauce originating from east coast of Peninsular Malaysia
- Conpoy – Cantonese dried scallop
- Dried shrimp – Dried shrimp used as seasoning
- Fish paste – Paste made of fish meat
- Fish sauce – Condiment made from fish
- Garum – Historical fermented fish sauce
- Kangkung belacan – Asian vegetable dish
- Liquamen – Historical fermented fish sauce
- List of Thai ingredients
- Ma Wan – Island in Hong Kong island (Tin Liu village) for one the Hong Kong site producing the paste
- Padaek – Lao pickled or fermented fish condiment
- Prahok – Cambodian salted and fermented fish paste
- Saeu-jeot – Fermented shrimp in Korean cuisine
- Surströmming – Swedish fermented Baltic Sea herring
