= Adobo (Filipino dish) =

Filipino dish of meat cooked in soy sauce and vinegar

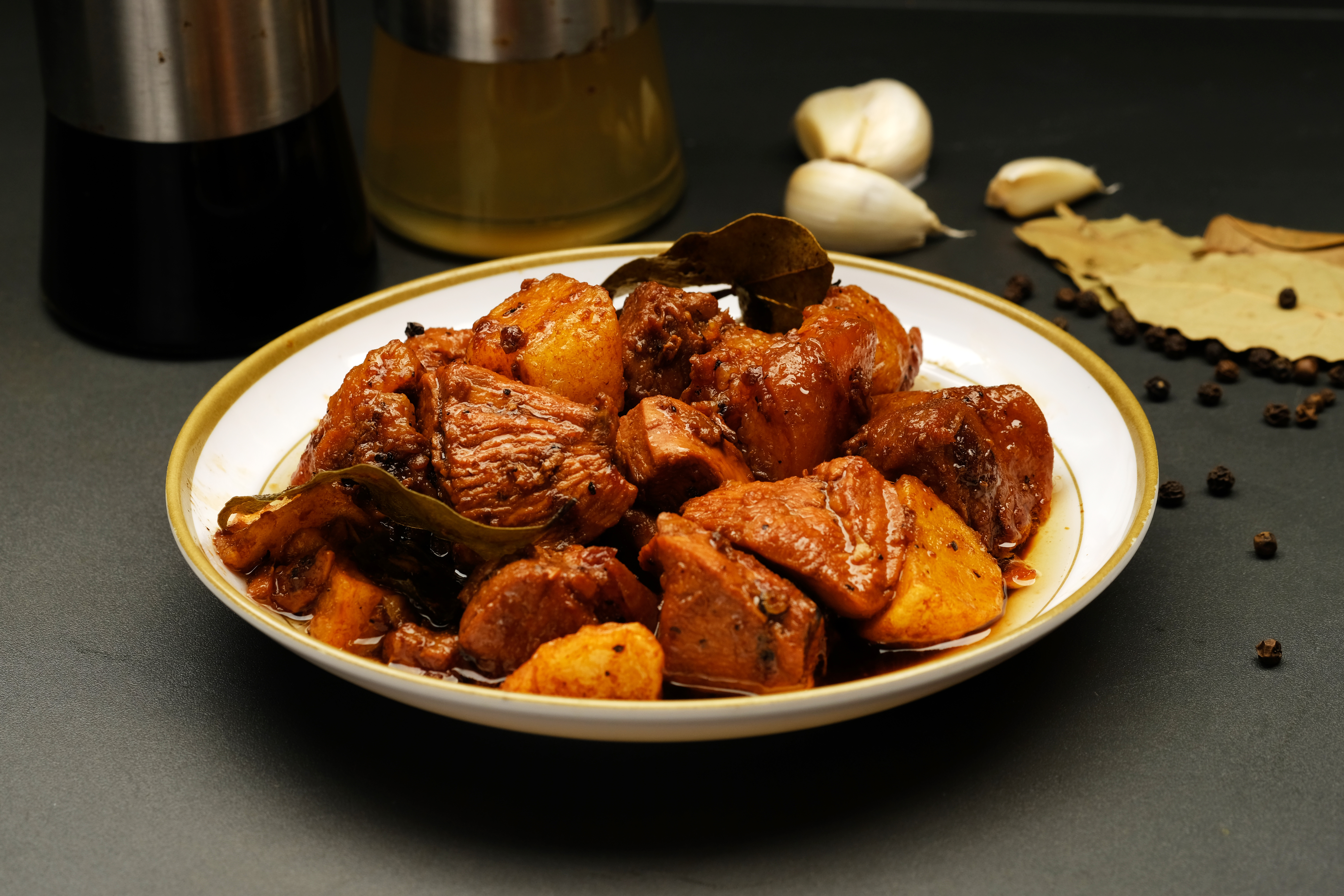
- A bowl of pork adobo
- Course: Main course
- Place of origin: Philippines
- Associated cuisine: Filipino cuisine
- Serving temperature: Hot
- Main ingredients: Meat (beef, chicken, pork), seafood, or vegetables; soy sauce, vinegar, cooking oil, garlic, black peppercorn, bay leaf
- Variations: Some sugar for a sweet-salty taste; dry versions with little or no sauce
- Food energy (per serving): Chicken: 107 kcal; Pork: 342 kcal; Beef: 349
- Similar dishes: Paksiw, kinilaw, estofadong baboy

Adobo (from Spanish: adobar: "marinade", "sauce" or "seasoning" / English: /əˈdoʊboʊ/, Tagalog pronunciation: [ɐdobo]) is a popular Filipino dish and cooking process in Philippine cuisine. In its base form, meat, seafood, or vegetables are first browned in oil, and then marinated and simmered in vinegar, salt and/or soy sauce, and garlic. It is often considered the unofficial national dish in the Philippines.

== History ==
The cooking method for the Philippine adobo is indigenous to the Philippines. The various precolonial peoples of the Philippine archipelago often cooked or prepared their food with vinegar and salt in various techniques to preserve them in the tropical climate. Vinegar, in particular, is one of the most important ingredients in Filipino cuisine, with the main traditional types being coconut, cane, nipa palm, and kaong palm. These are all linked to traditional alcohol fermentation, and relate to a wide array of fermentation techniques used to produce complex flavours in Filipino cooking.

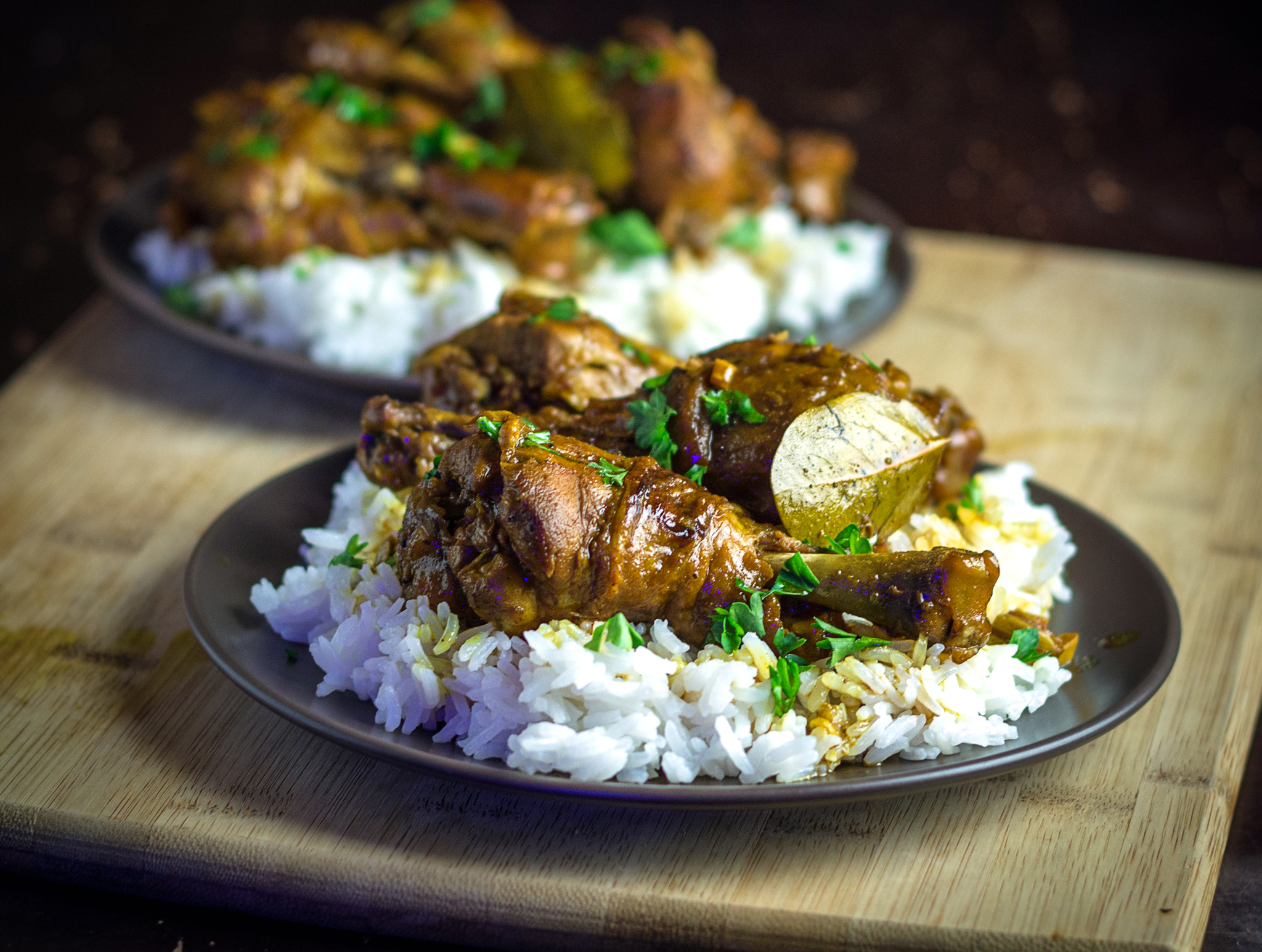
Chicken adobo on white rice

There are four main traditional cooking methods using vinegar in the Philippines: kiniláw (raw seafood in vinegar and spices), paksíw (a broth of meat with vinegar and spices), sangkutsá (pre-cooked braising of meat in vinegar and spices), and finally adobo (a stew of vinegar, garlic, salt/soy sauce, and other spices). Food historian Raymond Sokolov believed that the name "adobo" was applied to a native dish that already existed before the arrival of the Spanish Empire. Food historian and anthropologist Doreen Fernandez argued that adobo may have been indigenized from Mexican adobo, although she noted that the Filipino and Mexican dishes are significantly different. She also discussed the view of Sokolov that the term adobo was applied by Spanish colonizers to a native Filipino cooking style. Some writers have therefore suggested that the original indigenous name for the dish was lost, with paksiw proposed as the native term for what is now known as adobo.

The Spanish also applied the term adobo to native dishes that were marinated before consumption. It was first recorded in the 1613 dictionary Vocabulario de la lengua tagala compiled by the Spanish Franciscan missionary, Pedro de San Buenaventura, who referred to it as adobo de los naturales ("adobo of the native [peoples]"). In the 1794 edition of the Vocabulario, it was applied to quilauìn (kinilaw) a related but different dish which also primarily uses vinegar. In the 1711 Visayan dictionary Vocabulario de la lengua Bisaya, the term guinamus (verb form: gamus) was used to refer to any kind of marinades (adobo), from fish to pork. Other terms for precolonial adobo-like dishes among the Visayan peoples are dayok and danglusi. In modern Visayan, guinamós and dayok refer to separate dishes. The Spanish term adobo was applied to indigenous Philippine dishes cooked with vinegar. The original name of the dish before the Spanish period is unknown.

== Description ==
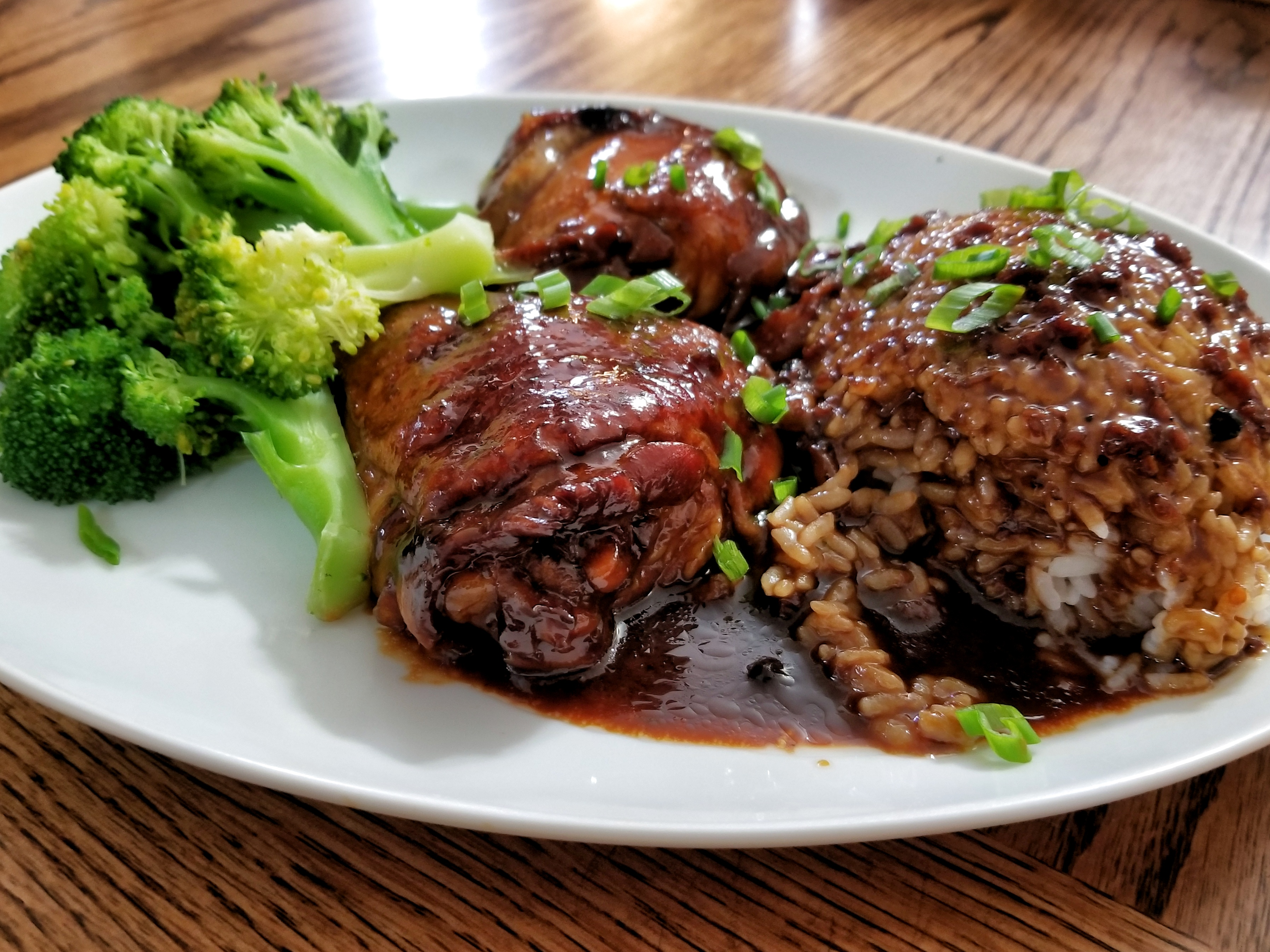
Chicken adobo with broccoli

While Philippine adobo is distinct from Spanish and Latin American adobos in its ingredients and cooking process, the dishes share the same name. Unlike the Spanish and Latin American adobo, Philippine adobo primarily uses ingredients native to Southeast Asia, including vinegar (made from palm sap or sugarcane), soy sauce (typically substituting salt), black peppercorns, and bay leaves (traditionally Cinnamomum spp. leaves; but in modern times, usually Laurus nobilis). It does not traditionally use chilis, paprika, oregano, or tomatoes. Its characteristic flavor is salty and sour, and often sweet, in contrast to Spanish and Mexican ''adobos'', which are spicier or infused with oregano.

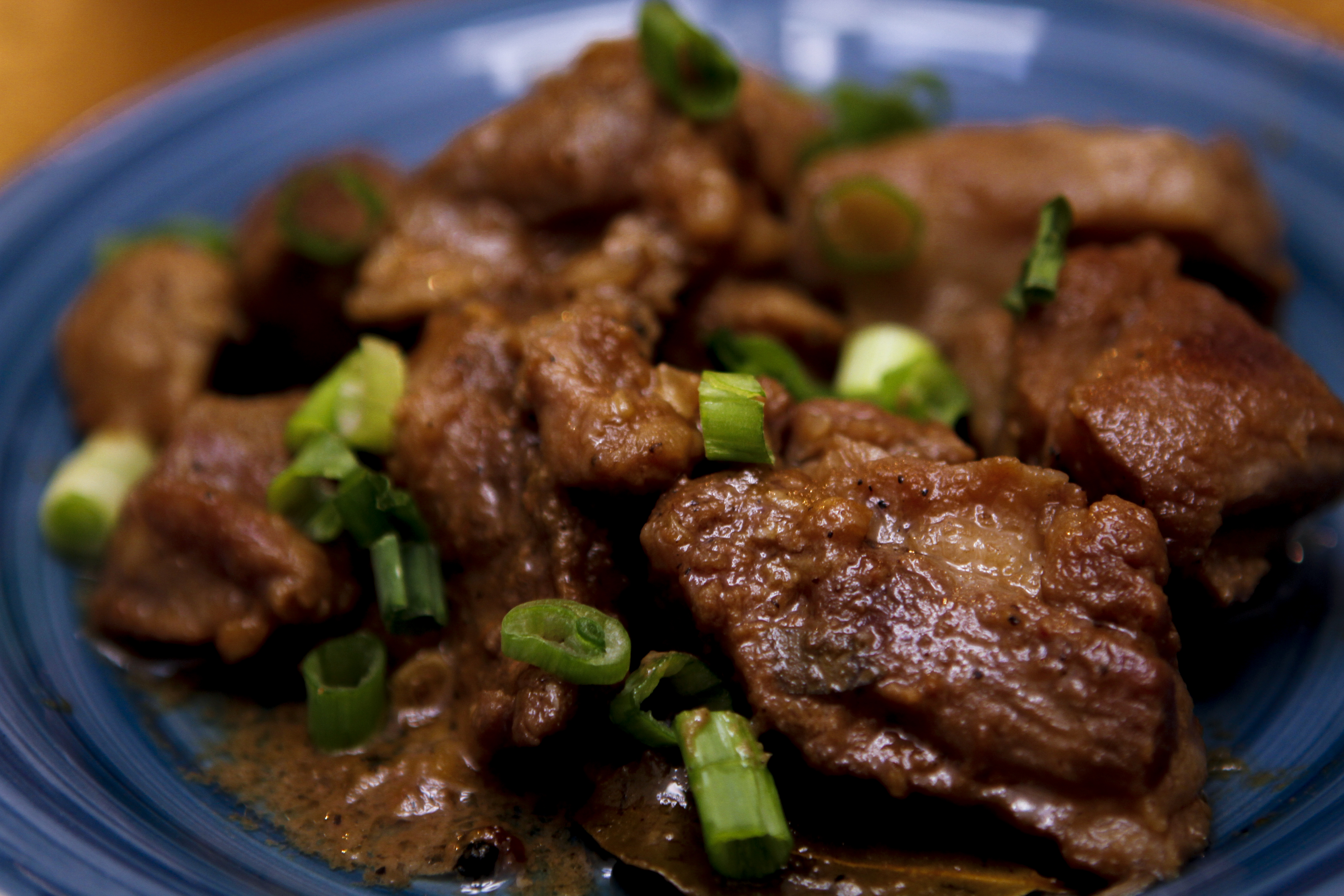
Pork adobo with scallions

Philippine adobo is generally understood as a cooking process rather than a single recipe, involving the braising of meat, seafood, or vegetables in vinegar and other seasonings. The use of soy sauce in some versions of Philippine ''adobo'' has been associated with Chinese influence on Philippine cuisine. Filipino journalist Jose Antonio Vargas described his version as a combination of chicken and pork marinated overnight in vinegar, soy sauce, and garlic, with brown sugar sometimes added depending on who he is cooking for. It was traditionally cooked in small clay pots (palayok or kulon); but today, metal pots or woks (kawali) are largely used instead.

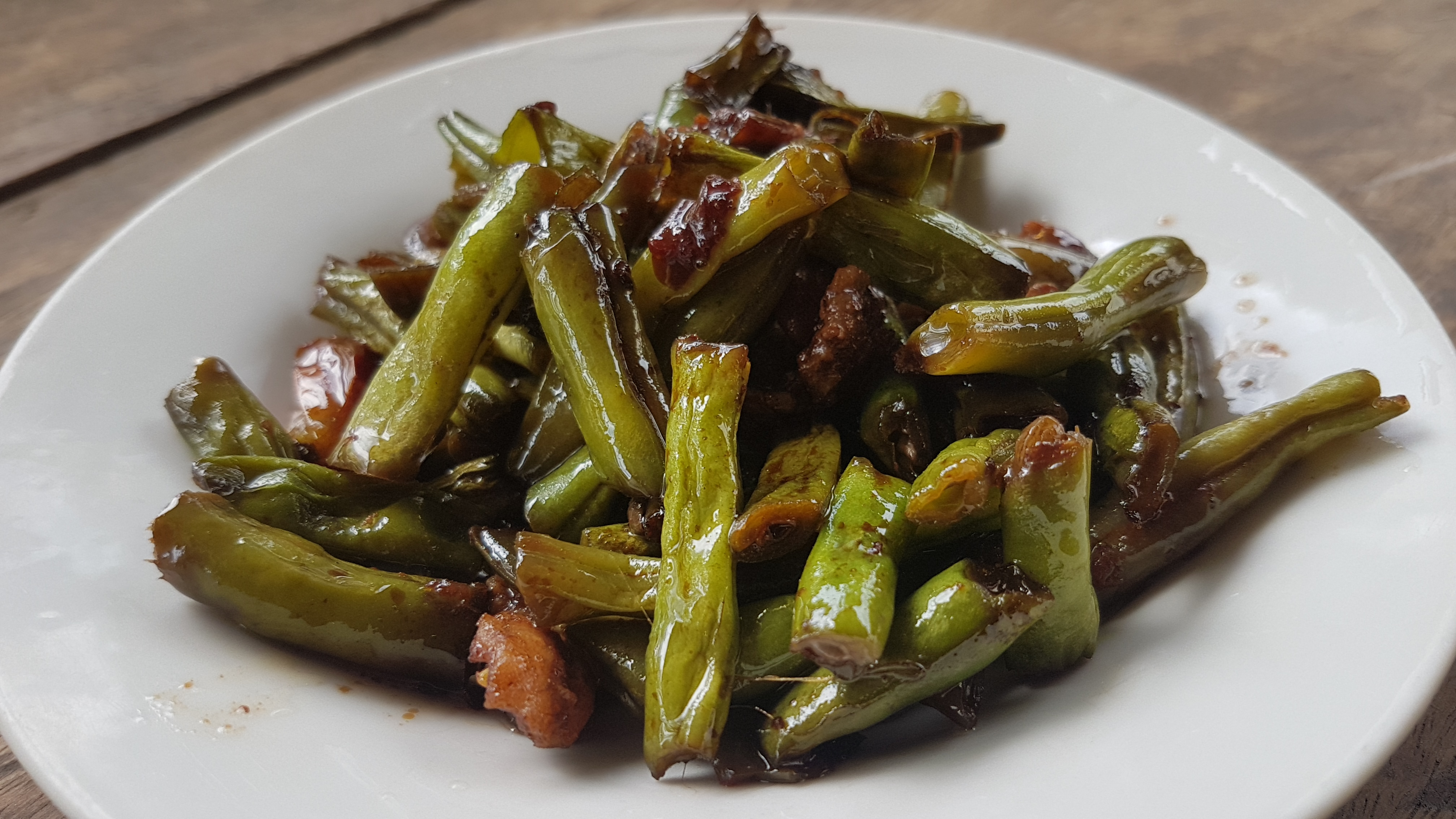
Adobong sitaw (green beans and pork)

Adobo has been called the quintessential Philippine stew, served with rice both at daily meals and at feasts. It is commonly packed for Filipino mountaineers and travelers because it keeps well without refrigeration. Its relatively long shelf-life is due to one of its primary ingredients, vinegar, which inhibits the growth of bacteria.

== Variations ==
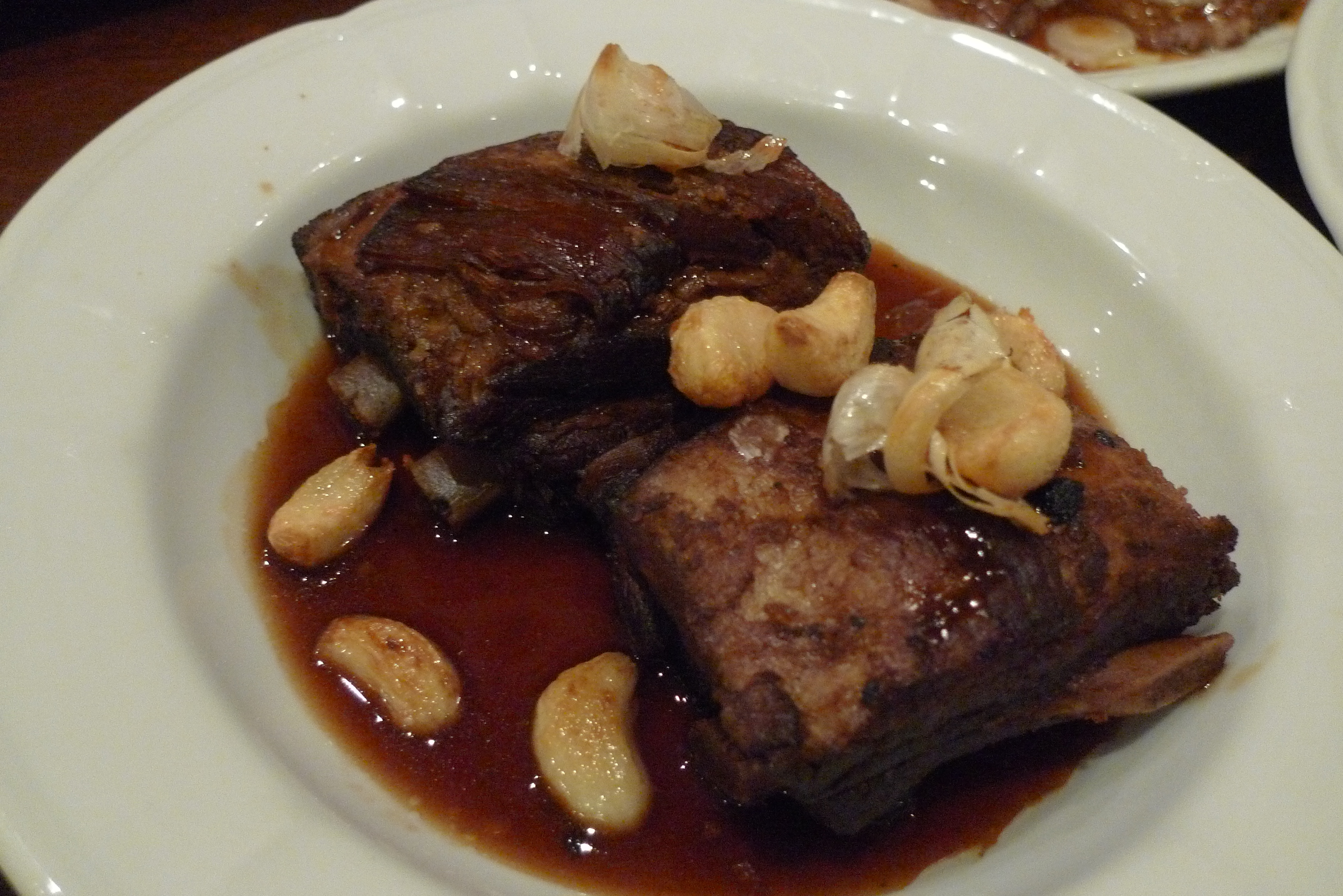
Beef adobo in a Filipino restaurant

There are numerous variants of the adobo recipes in the Philippines. The most basic ingredient of adobo is vinegar, with coconut sap vinegar and rice vinegar among the types used; white wine or cider vinegar may also be used. Adobo has numerous regional and personal variations, with different households preparing the dish in different ways. A rarer version without soy sauce is known as adobong puti ("white adobo"), which uses salt instead, to contrast it with adobong itim ("black adobo"), the more prevalent versions with soy sauce. Based on the main ingredients, the most common ''adobo'' types are ''adobong manok'', in which chicken is used, and ''adobong baboy'', in which pork is used. Adobong baka is another variation that uses beef. It is similar to another dish known as pinatisan, where patis (fish sauce) is used instead of vinegar.

Other meats may also be used, such as beef, quail, duck, and venison. Seafood variants include fish, catfish, shrimp, and squid or cuttlefish. The cooking process is also applied to vegetables, fruits, and various edible animal parts, with vegan options including vegetables and fruits, like water spinach, bamboo shoots, eggplant, banana flowers, and okra. Offal and giblets can also be cooked as adobo, like liver, gizzard, heart, and neck. Less common preparations use other ingredients, including snake, monitor lizard, frog, Kapampangan adobong kamaru made with mole cricket, and the adobong atáy at balúnbalunan, which uses chicken liver and gizzard.

In Batangas and Laguna, turmeric is added to adobo, giving it a distinct yellowish color (known as adobong dilaw, "yellow adobo"), as well as a red variant using achuete seeds in the former. In adobong dilaw, vinegar, garlic, sugar, and onions are added, while soy sauce is omitted. The proportion of ingredients like soy sauce, bay leaves, garlic, or black pepper can vary. The amount and thickness of the sauce also varies as some like their adobo dry while some like it saucy. Other ingredients can sometimes be used; like siling labuyo, bird's eye chili, jalapeño pepper, red bell pepper, olive oil, onions, brown sugar, potatoes, pineapple, or lemon-lime sodas like Sprite. It may also be further browned in the oven, pan-fried, deep-fried, or even grilled to get crisped edges.

There are also regional variations. In Bicol and Zamboanga City, it is common for adobo to have coconut milk (known as adobo sa gatâ). In Cavite mashed pork liver is added. In the northernmost province of Batanes, the Ivatan prepare a type of adobo called luñiz, where they preserve pork in jars with salt. Adobo has also become a favorite of Filipino-based fusion cuisine, with avant-garde cooks coming up with variants such as "Japanese-style" pork adobo. Pork adobo with rice is a combination of jasmine rice with pandan leaf and served with mango atchara.

Philippine adobo variants

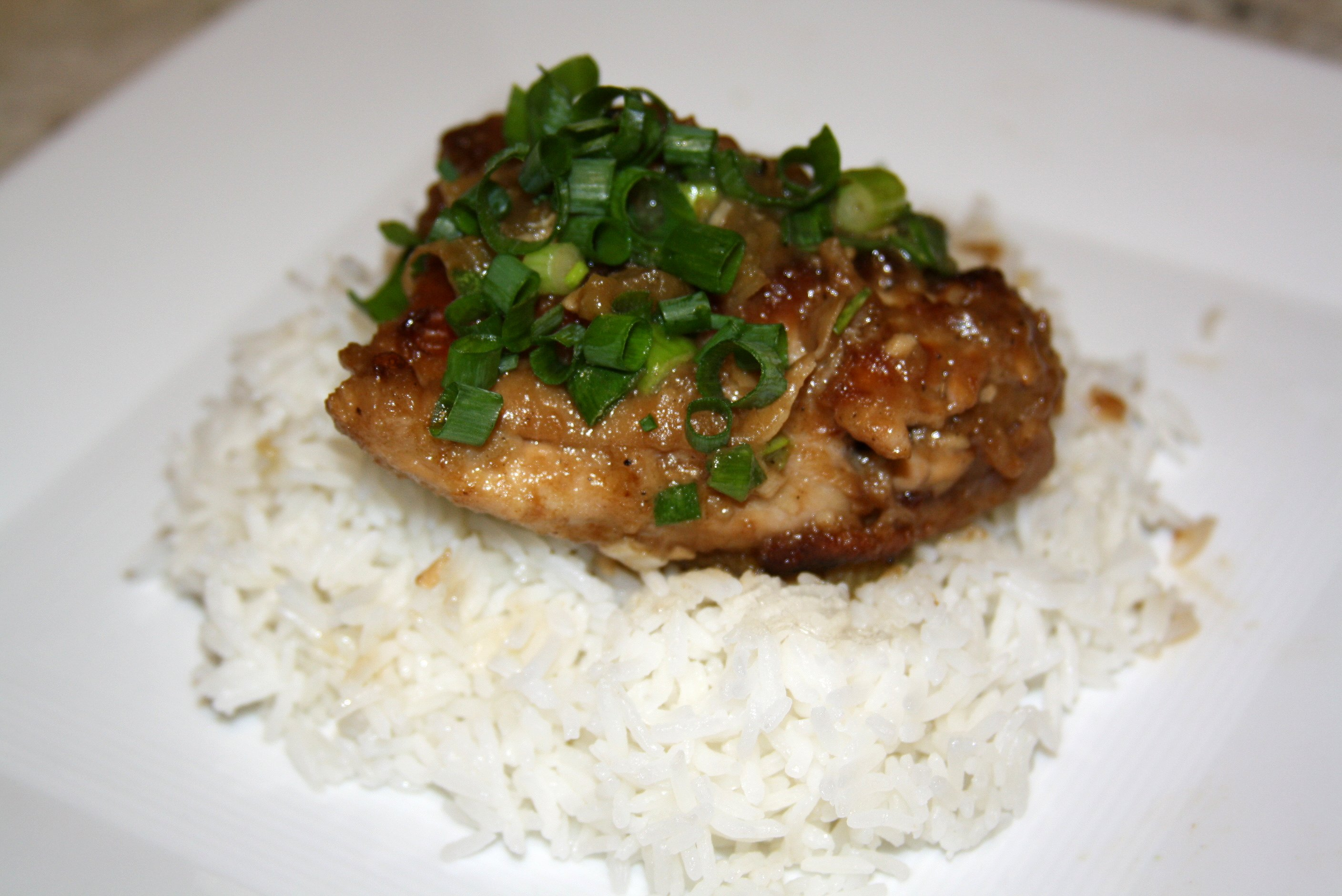
Adobong manok (chicken) over rice

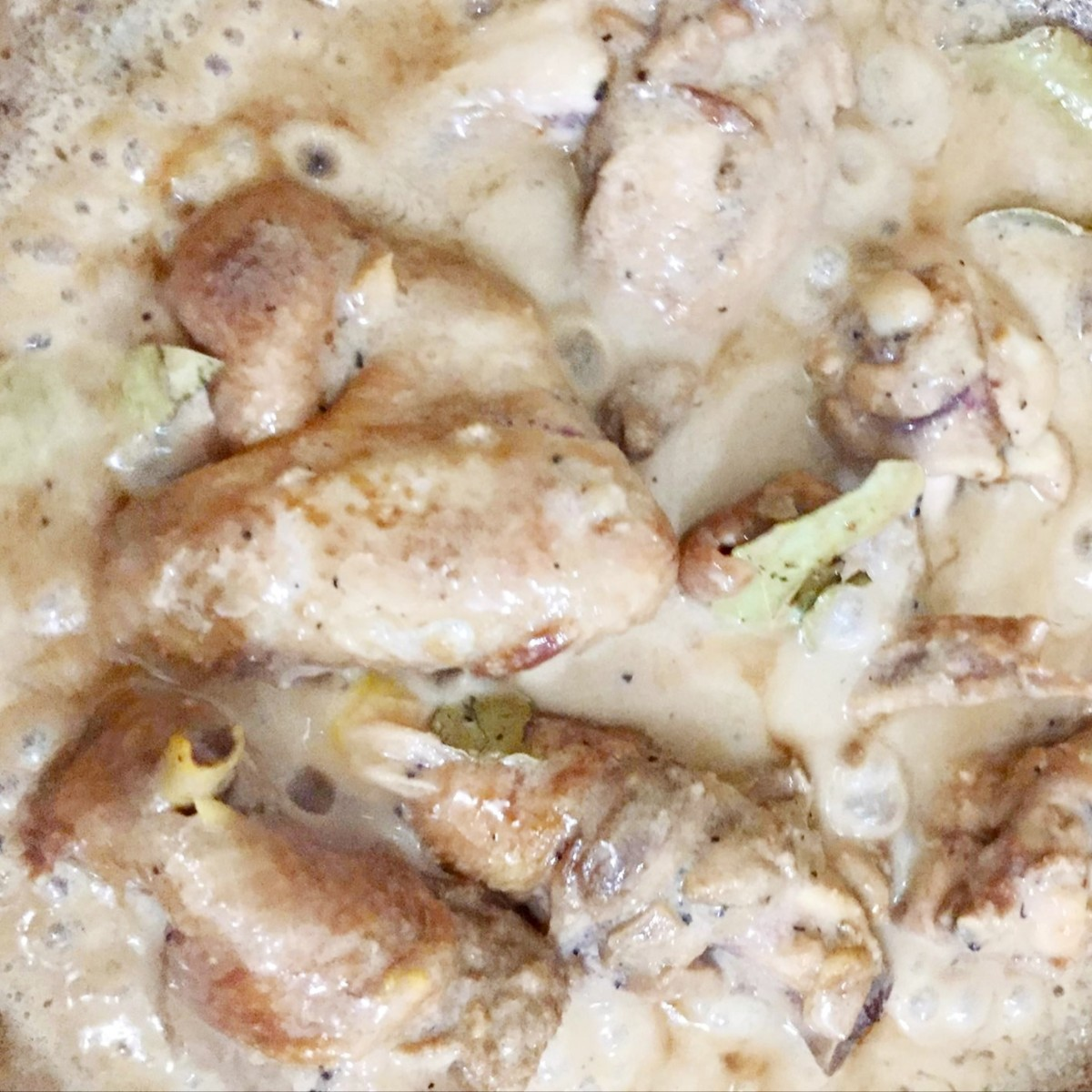
Adobo sa gatâ (with coconut milk)

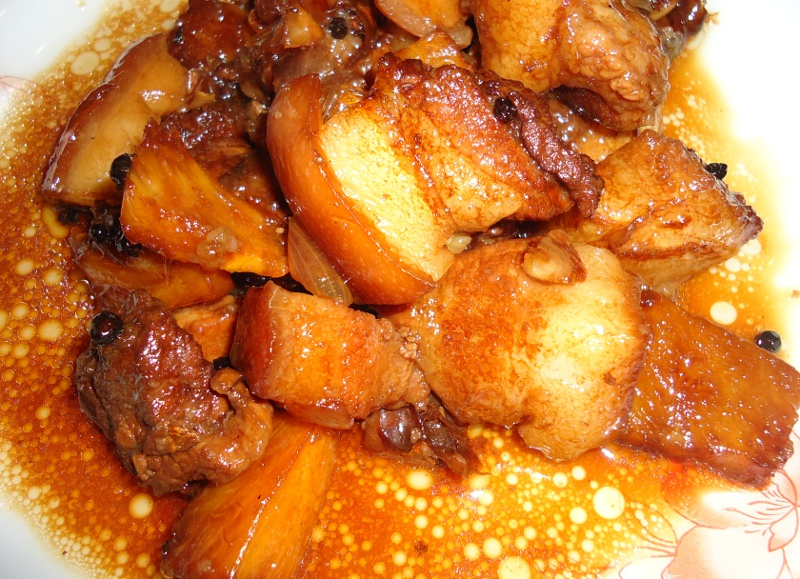
Adobong baboy (pork) with pineapple

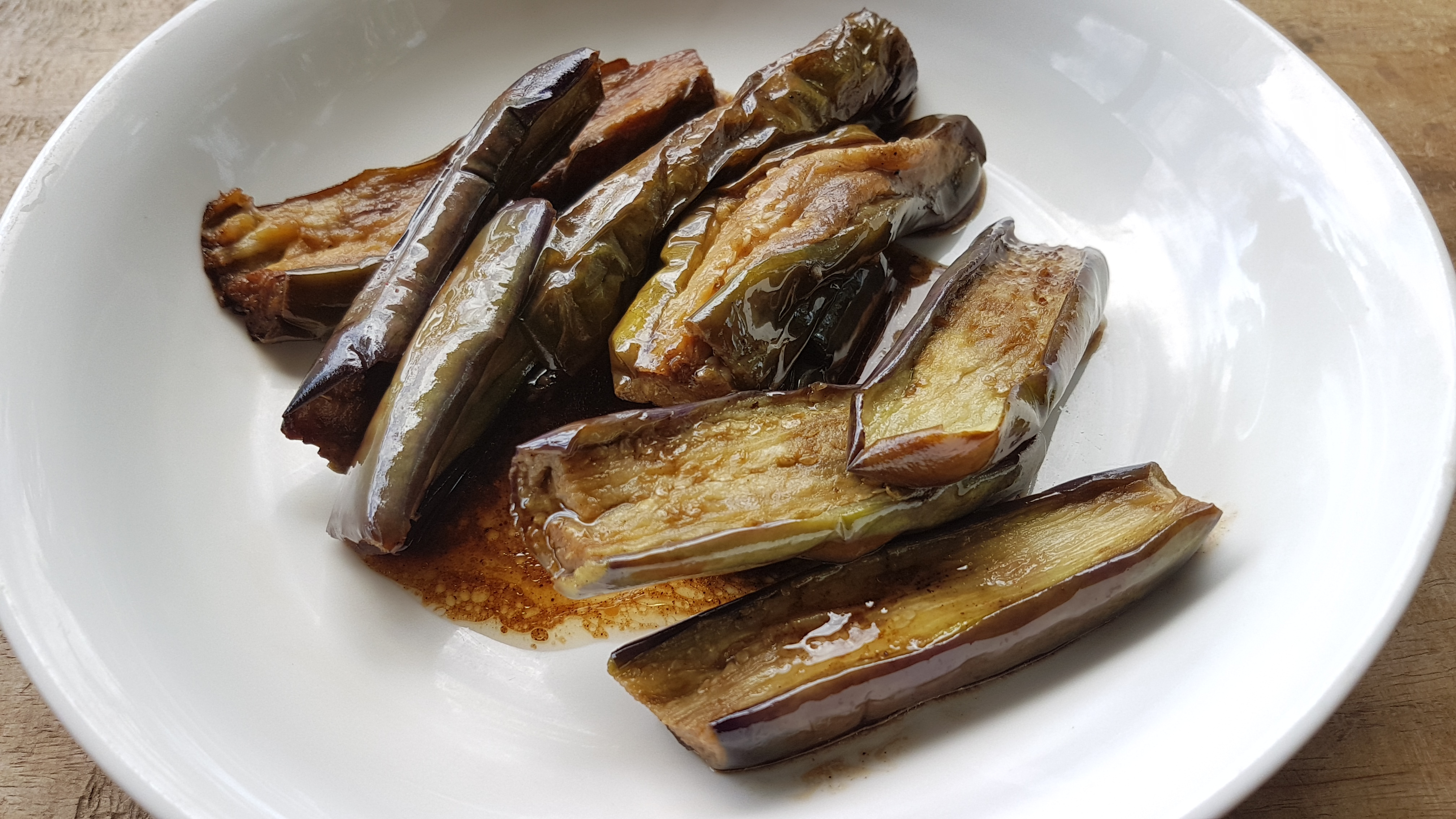
Adobong talóng
(eggplant)

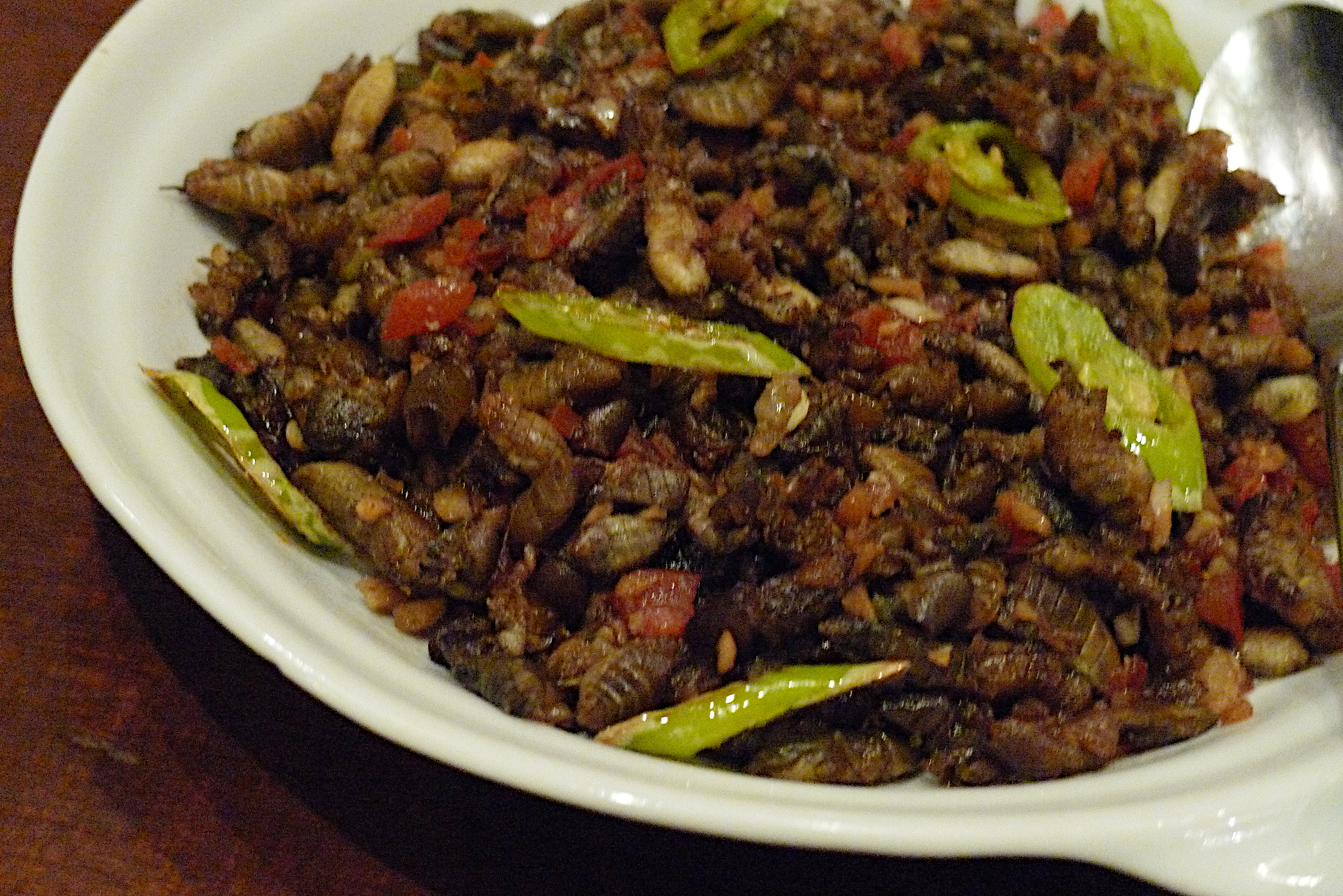
Adobong kamaru
(mole crickets)

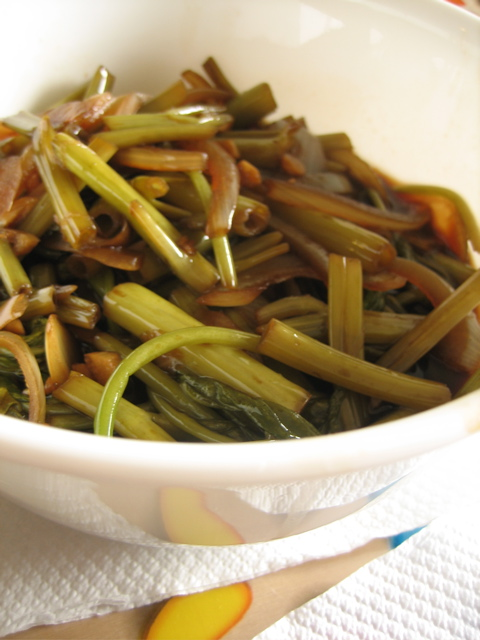
Adobong kangkóng
(water spinach)

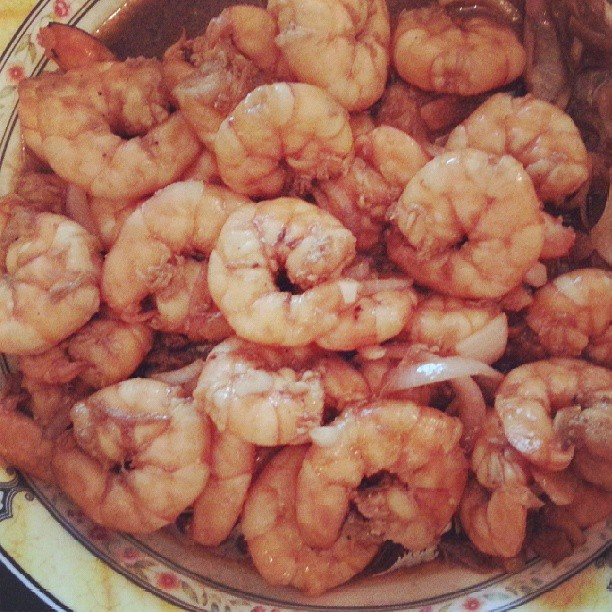
Adobong hipon (shrimp)

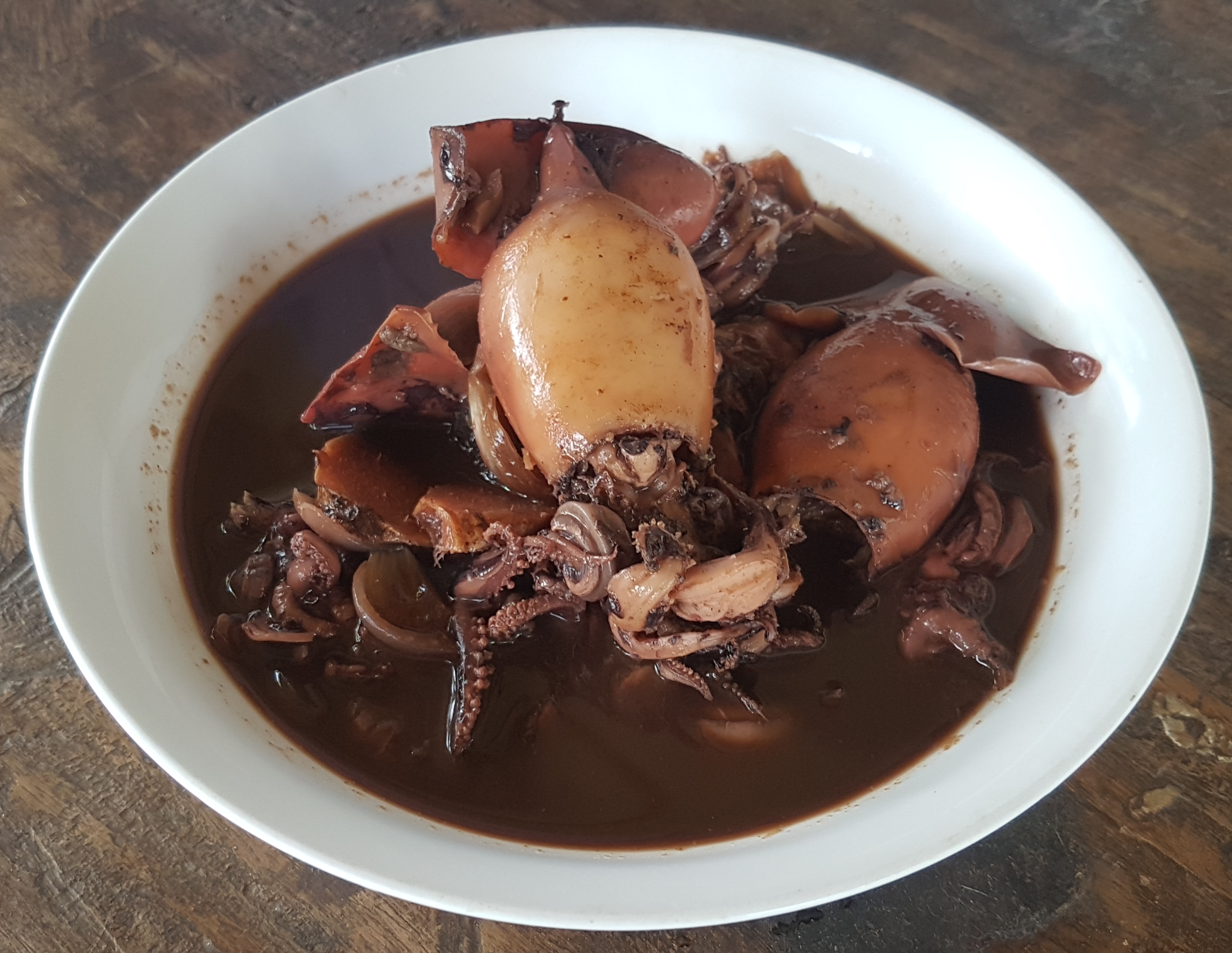
Adobong pusit (squid)

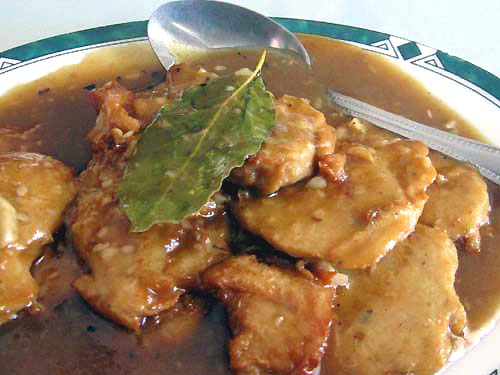
Vegetarian adobo

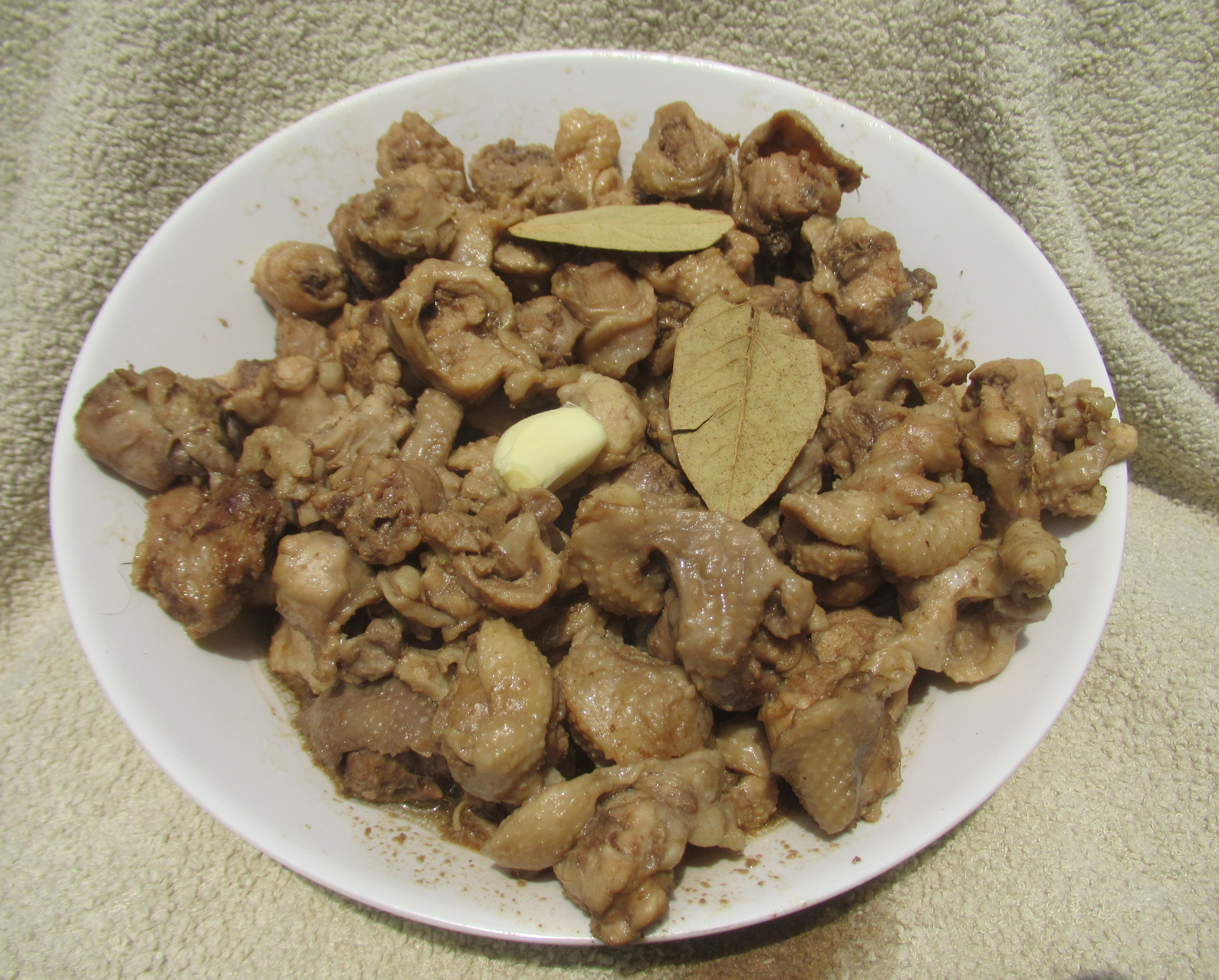
Adobo made with chicken necks

== Other uses ==
Outside of the dish itself, the flavor of adobo has been developed commercially and adapted to other foods. Local Philippine snack products, such as garlic fried peanuts (also known as adobong mani), are marketed as "adobo flavored".

== Standardization ==
In 2021, the Bureau of Philippine Standards of the Department of Trade and Industry (DTI-BPS) of the Philippines unveiled plans to standardize the most popular Filipino dishes to make it easier to promote them internationally as well as keep their cultural identity. Philippine adobo will be the first of such dishes to be standardized. The definition will be set by a technical committee headed by Glenda Rosales Barreto, and includes representatives from the academia, government departments, the food industry, chefs, and food writers. The main reference will be Kulinarya: A Guidebook to Philippine Cuisine (2008), authored by Barreto and the committee vice-chairperson Myrna Segismundo, both notable chefs of Filipino cuisine in their own right. The announcement has received some criticism from the public, but the DTI-BPS clarified that it's not mandatory and will only aim to define a basic traditional recipe that can serve as a benchmark for determining the authenticity of Filipino dishes in the international setting.

== In popular culture ==
On March 15, 2023, Google Doodles released a Philippine Adobo doodle.

== See also ==
Related Philippine dishes and cooking techniques:
- Humba
- Pata tim
- Paksiw
- Kinilaw
- Dinuguan
- Estofadong baboy

- Ayam kecap - similarly styled dish from Indonesia and Malaysia
- Semur (Indonesian stew) - similarly styled dish from Indonesia
- Tsukudani - similar cooking technique from Japan
- Dongpo pork - a similar dish, named in honor of the Chinese anti-drug crusader and official Su Shi (Su Dongpo).
