= Bagoong =

Type of Philippine condiment

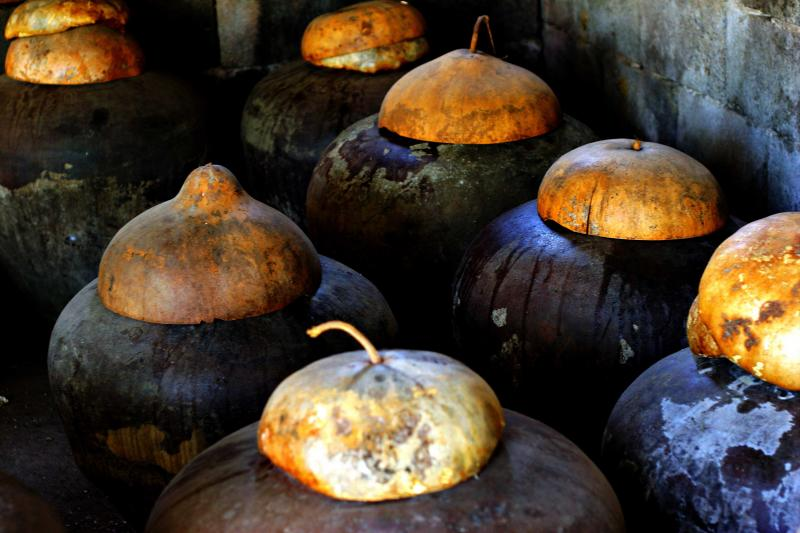
- Traditional burnay jars containing fermenting bagoong in Ilocos Norte
- Type: Condiment
- Region or state: Philippines
- Associated cuisine: Philippines
- Main ingredients: Fish

Bagoóng (Tagalog pronunciation: [bɐɡuˈʔoŋ]; buh-goo-ONG) is a Philippine condiment partially or completely made of either fermented fish (bagoóng isdâ) or krill or shrimp paste (bagoóng alamáng) with salt. The fermentation process of bagoóng isdâ also produces fish sauce known as patís.

The preparation of bagoóng can vary regionally in the Philippines.

== Types ==
Bagoóng is usually made from a variety of fish species, including the following:

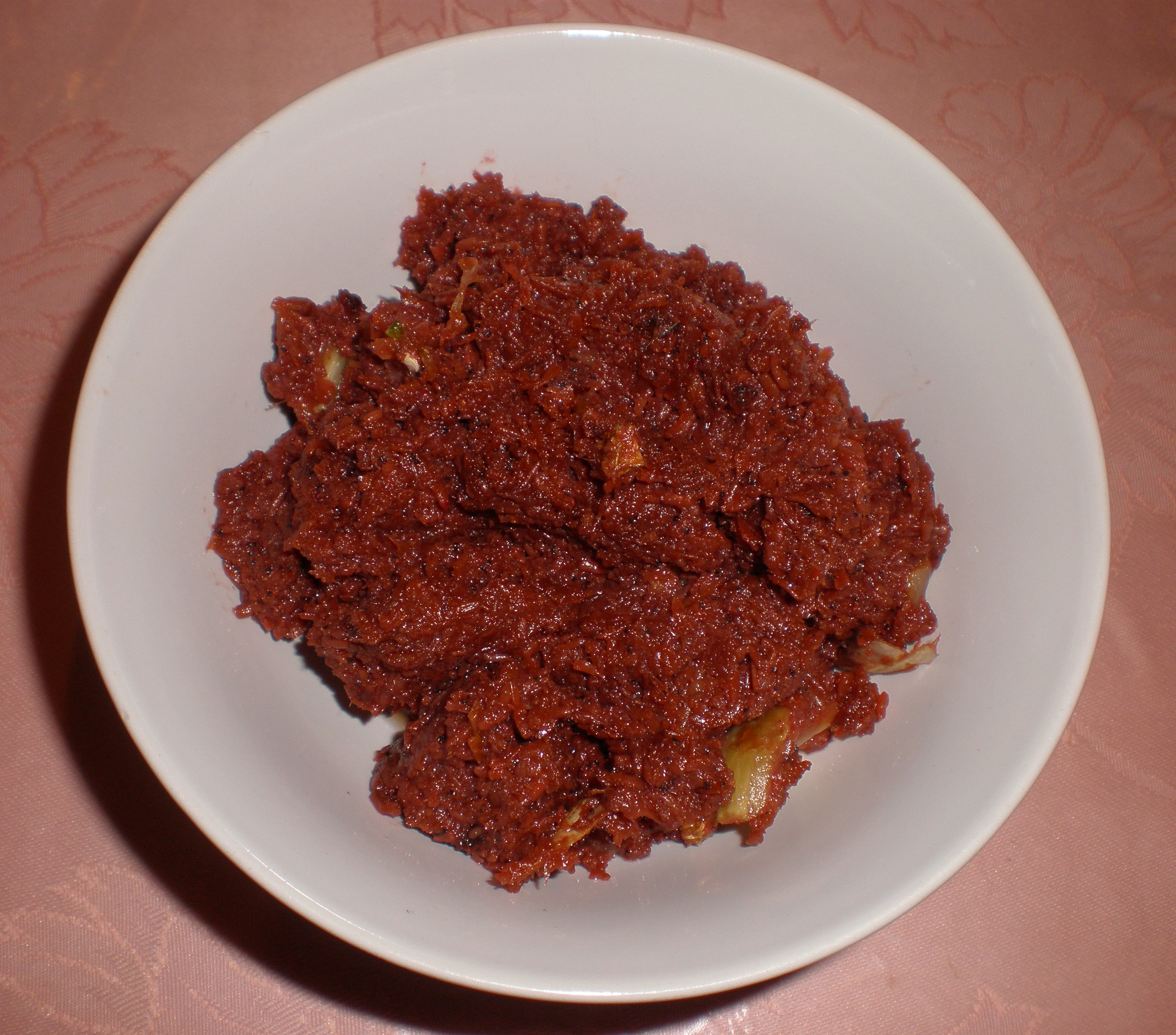
Bagoóng alamáng is made by fermenting krill in salt

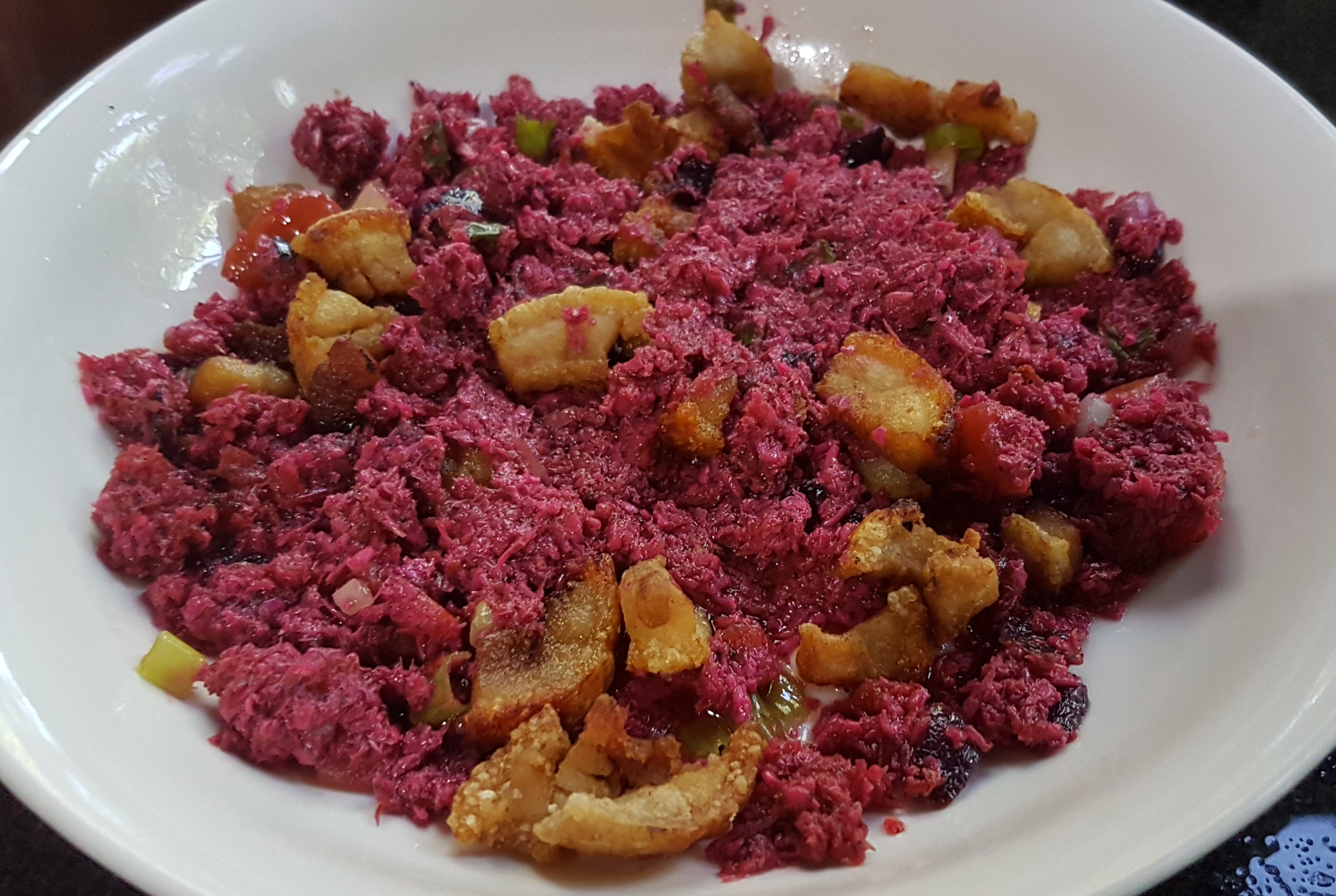
Bagoóng alamáng sauteed with tomatoes, garlic, and onion with pork chicharrón

- Anchovies - known as dilis, monamon, bolináw, or gurayan (Stolephrus and Encrasicholina species)
- Round scads - known as galunggóng or tamodios (Decapterus species)
- Bonnetmouths (redbait or rubyfish) - known as terong (Emmelichthys nitidus, Emmelichthys struhsakeri, and Plagiogeneion rubiginosum)
- Ponyfish - known as sapsáp (Leiognathus, Photopectoralis, and Equulites species)
- Rabbitfish - known as padas (Siganus species)
- Bar-eyed gobies - known as ipon (Glossogobius giuris)
- Herrings - known as lila (Clupeoides)
- Silver perch - known as ayungin (Leiopotherapon plumbeus)

Bagoóng made from fish is encompassed by the term bagoóng isdâ (lit. "fish bagoong") in Luzon and northern parts of the Visayas. They can be distinguished further by the type of fish they are made of. Those made from anchovies are generally known as bagoóng monamon or bagoóng dilis and those from bonnetmouths as bagoong terong.

In the southern Visayas and Mindanao, fish bagoong made from anchovies is known as guinamos (also spelled ginamos). Larger fermented fish are known as tinabal.

Bagoong can also be made from krill. This type of bagoong is known as bagoong alamang. It is called uyap or alamáng in the southern Philippines, aramang in Ilocos and parts of Northern Luzon, and ginamos or dayok in western Visayas.

In rarer instances, it can also be made from oysters, clams, and fish and shrimp roe. A variant made in the town of Balayan, Batangas is also known as bagoong Balayan.

Vegan bagoóng alamáng is a type of fermented Philippine condiment which does not come from animal product. Instead, squash, moringa and other vegetables are used.

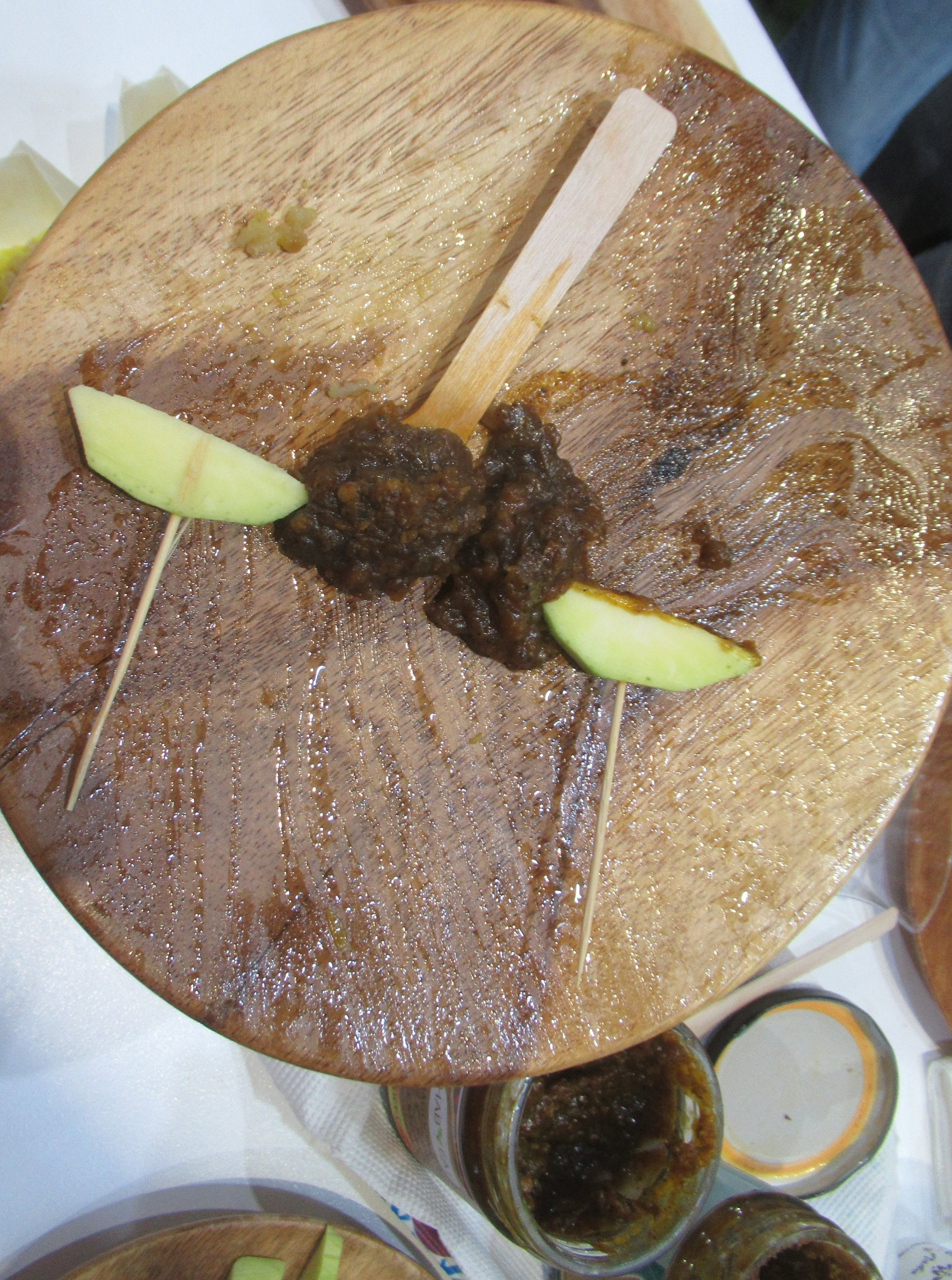
Vegan bagoóng

== Preparation ==
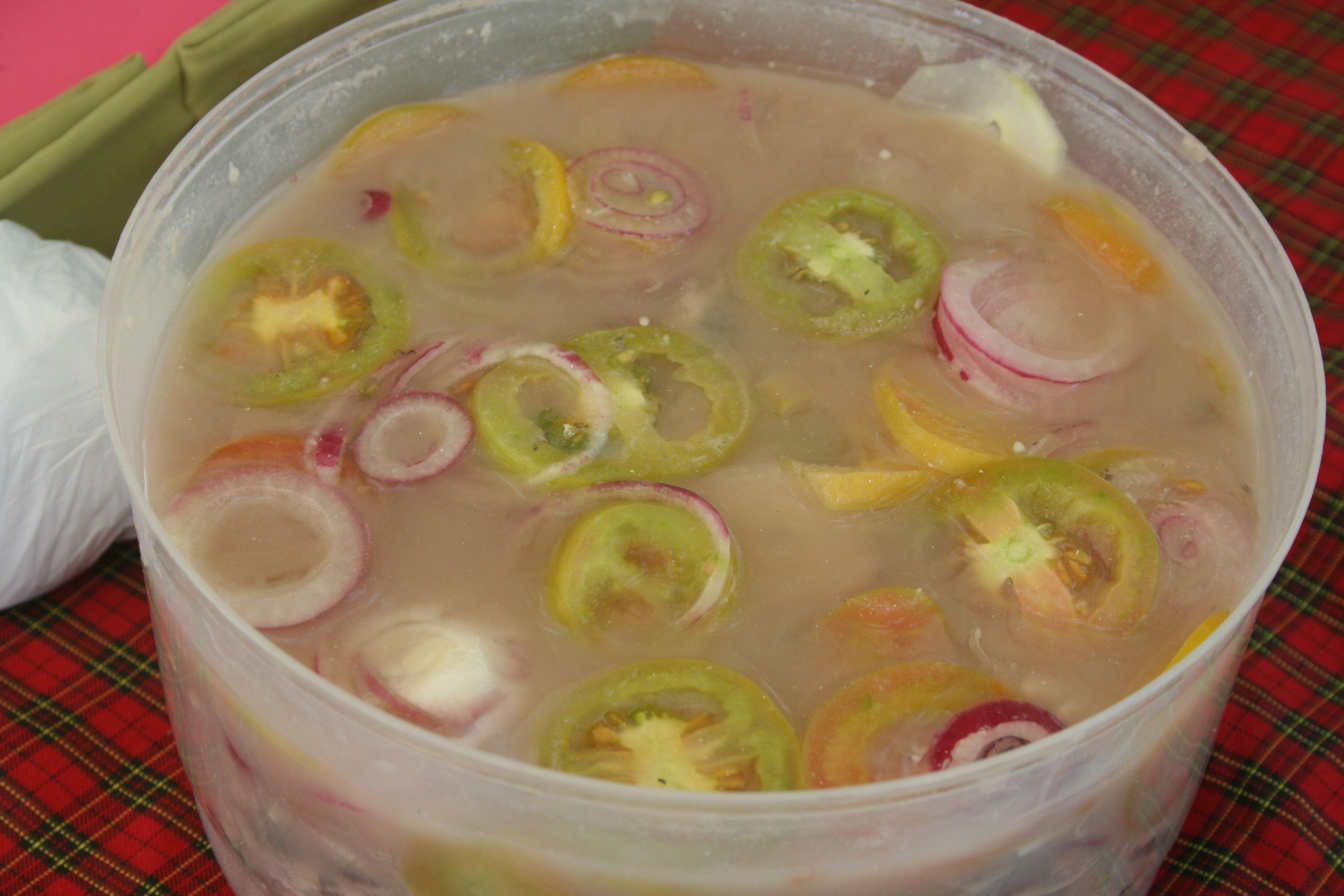
Guinamos (fish bagoong) with tomatoes and onions from Cebu

=== Bagoóng isdâ and bagoóng alamáng ===
Bagoóng isdâ is prepared by mixing salt and fish usually by volume; mixture proportions are proprietary depending on the manufacturer. The salt and fish are mixed uniformly, usually by hand. The mixture is kept inside large earthen fermentation jars (known as tapayan in Tagalog and Visayan languages, and burnay in Ilocano). It is covered, to keep insects away, and left to ferment for 30–90 days with occasional stirring to make sure the salt is spread evenly. The mixture can expand significantly during the process.

The preparation of bagoóng alamáng (shrimp or krill paste) is similar, with krill cleaned thoroughly and washed in weak brine solution (10%). As with fish bagoóng, the shrimp are then mixed with salt in a 25% salt to 75% shrimp ratio by weight.

The products of the fermentation process are usually pale gray to white in color. To obtain the characteristic red or pink color of some bagoóng variants, a red yeast-like starter known as angkák is added. Angkák is made from rice inoculated with the red mould Monascus purpureus. High-quality salt with little mineral impurities is preferred. High metallic content in the salt used can often lead to darker colors in the resulting bagoóng and a less agreeable under-taste. Likewise, oversalting and undersalting also has a significant impact on the rate and quality of fermentation due to their effects on the bacteria involved in the process. Some manufacturers grind the fermented product finely and sell the resulting mixture as fish paste.

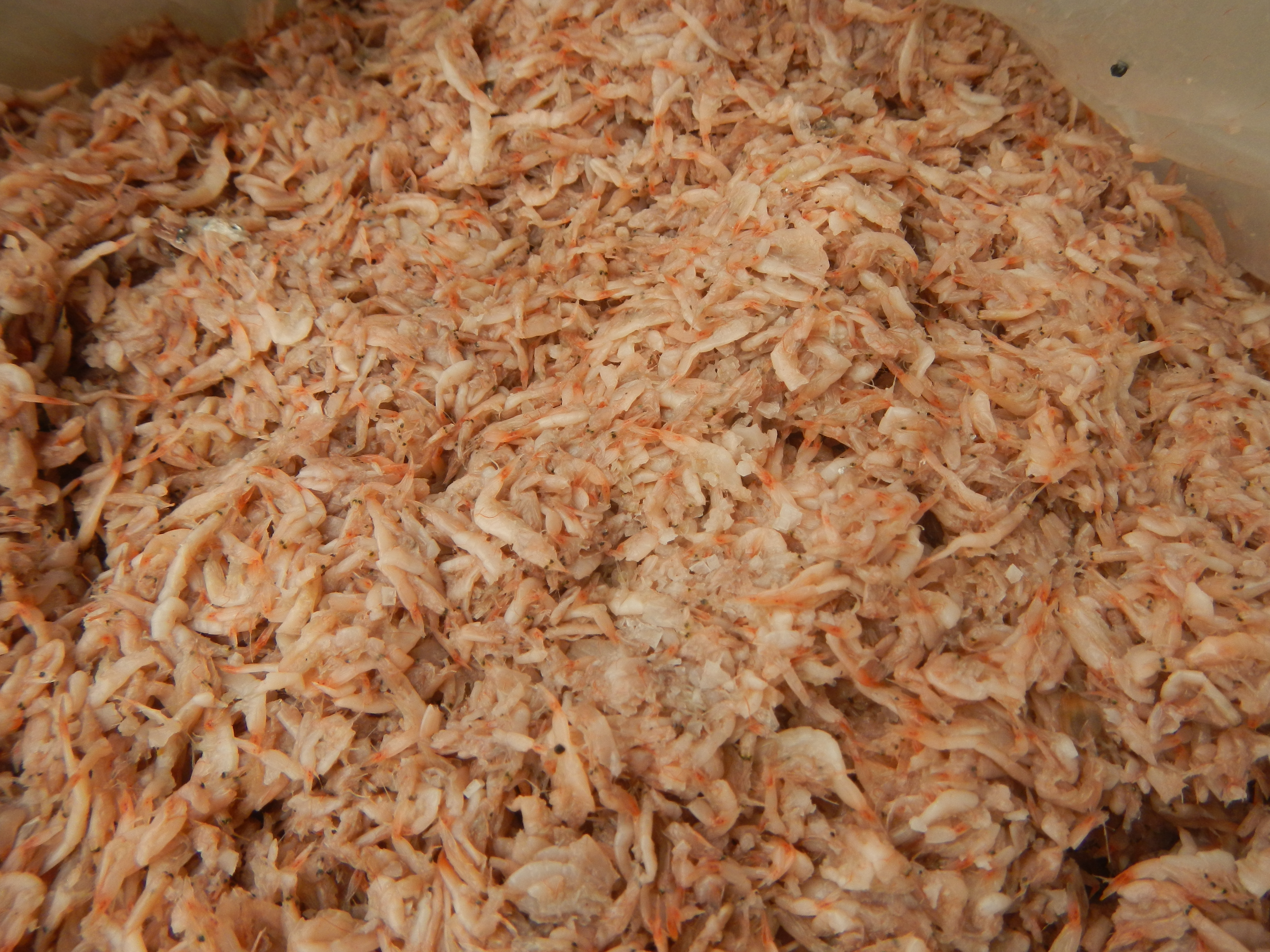
Bagoóng alamáng from Malolos, Bulacan

=== Patís ===
Patís or fish sauce is a byproduct of the fermentation process. It is a clear, yellowish liquid that floats above the fermented mixture, and has a sharp salty or cheese-like flavor. Sauces similar to patís include nước mắm in Vietnam, nam pha (ນ້ຳປາ) in Laos, hom ha in China, nam pla in Thailand, shottsuru in Japan and saeu chot in Korea, as well as the garum of ancient Greece and the Roman Empire. Indonesia has an East Javanese condiment called petis (pronounced similar to patís): a paste made from the caramelized fermented reduction of pindang broth, a spicy and tangy herbal soup typically containing fish or shrimp (occasionally, beef or eggs).

To obtain patís, fermentation is longer, usually taking six months to a year. During the longer fermentation processes, the fish or shrimp constituents disintegrate further, producing a clear, yellowish liquid on top of the mixture due to hydrolysis. This is the patís; it can be harvested once it has developed its characteristic smell. It is drained, pasteurized, and bottled separately, while the residue is turned into bagoóng. If the residual solids are not moist enough, brine is usually added. The rate of fermentation can vary depending on the pH levels of the mixture and the temperature. Exposure to sunlight can also reduce the amount of time required to two months.

== Reputation ==
Over the centuries, people unfamiliar with bagoong have given it a reputation as an "exotic" dish, portraying in a positive or negative light, depending on the point of view of the writer. For example, one early description was Spanish colonial official Antonio de Morga, whose book Sucesos de las Islas Filipinas (Events in the Philippine Isles) included a description of bagoong as "fish which ... has started to rot and stink." This later prompted preeminent Philippine nationalist Jose Rizal to denounce the descriptions in his 1890 annotation, saying:

This is another preoccupation of the Spaniards who, like any other nation, treat food to which they are not accustomed or is unknown to them with disgust. ... This fish that Morga mentions, that cannot be good until it begins to rot, is bagoong and those who have eaten it and tasted it know that it neither is nor should be rotten.

== See also ==
- Bagoong fried rice
- Balao-balao
- Binagoongan
- Burong isda
- Dayok
- List of fermented foods
- List of fish sauces
- Taba ng talangka
- Palapa
