= Pinakbet =

Ilocano (Filipino) dish of mixed vegetables

Pinakbét
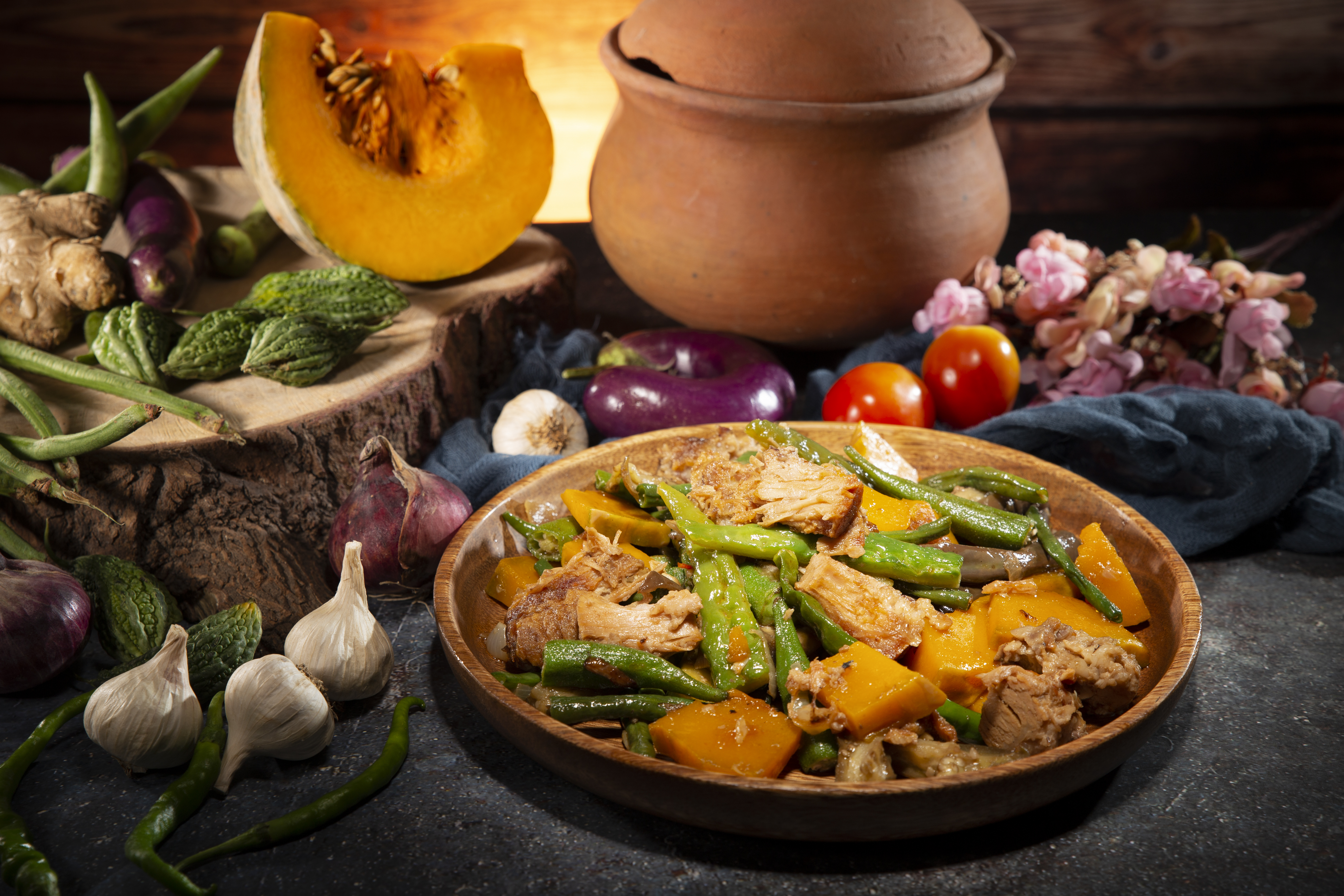
- Modern version of pinakbet, consisting of eggplant, squash, bitter mellon, okra, and long beans, topped with bagnet, a crispy deep-fried pork belly.
- Alternative names: Pakbét, Pinakebbét
- Course: Main course
- Place of origin: Philippines
- Region or state: Ilocos Region
- Serving temperature: Hot, room temperature
- Main ingredients: Fermented anchovies, eggplant, bitter mellon, okra, string beans, tomato and sweet potato or squash.
- Ingredients generally used: Garlic, onion or shallots.
- Variations: Pakbet-Tagalog, Ginataang Pakbet
- Similar dishes: Dinengdeng

Pinakbet, also known as pakbét, is a Filipino vegetable dish characterized by its savory, earthy, and complex flavor profile, primarily derived from the pungent, salty umami of fermented fish sauce made from anchovies (buggúong or bagoong isda) or, in some modern variations, shrimp paste (armang or bagoong alamang). It traditionally consists of a variety of vegetables, including eggplant, tomato, okra, bitter melon, string beans, and sweet potato, although modern versions may use squash as a substitute. It is commonly served as a main course and eaten with steamed rice. Originating from the Ilocos Region in northern Luzon, Philippines, pinakbet is a staple dish among the Ilocano people.

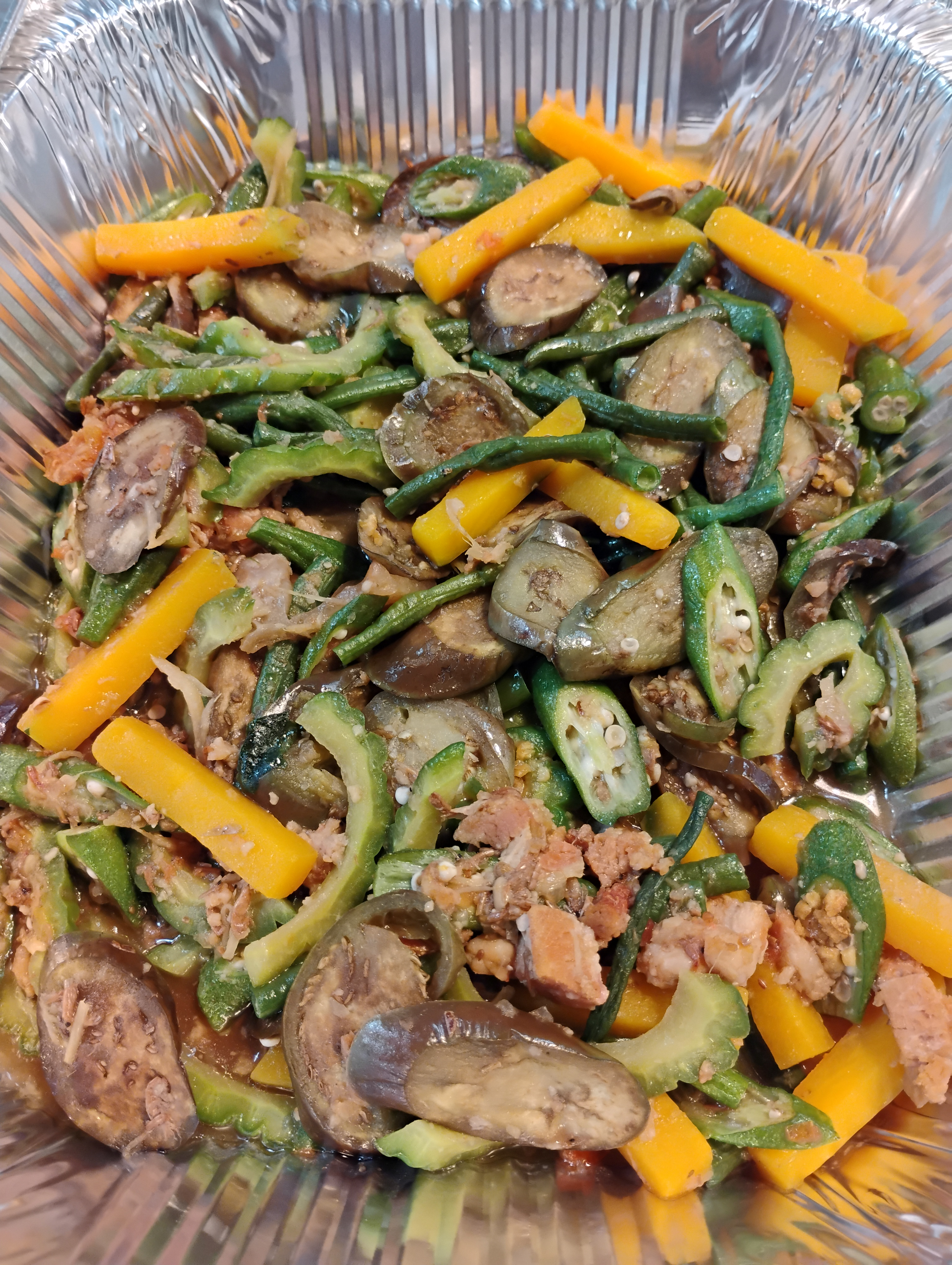
Tagalog-style pinakbet, a regional variation in which the vegetables are sautéed and may include squash (kalabasa).

Traditionally, pinakbet is prepared by cooking the vegetables together with fermented fish sauce using a method that falls between shallow boiling and steaming, often without the use of added fats or oils. In other regional variations, such as Tagalog-style pinakbet, the ingredients are sautéed prior to cooking, partly to lessen the strong aroma of the fermented fish sauce, and squash may be used as a substitute. Some versions substitute shrimp paste, while others incorporate coconut milk.

== Etymology ==
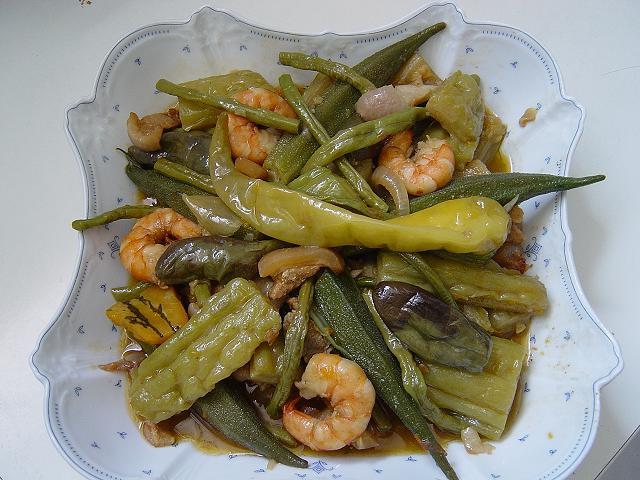
Pinakbet with shrimp

The etymology of pinakbet traces back to the Iloco (Ilocano) word pinakebbet, which is derived from the root word kebbet, meaning "shriveled" or "dried up." This refers to the visual transformation of the vegetables as they cook, where their moisture evaporates, and they shrink in size. The prefix pina- in Ilocano often conveys a sense of something being done or prepared, giving the term pinakebbet the meaning of vegetables that have been "shriveled" or "shrunk" through cooking. While pakbet has also evolved into a colloquial or slang term.

The word pinakbet is thus a reflection of the dish's preparation method, where vegetables are slowly simmered until they soften and shrink, absorbing the rich flavors of the accompanying seasonings. The etymology highlights the focus on the texture and cooking process, rather than the specific ingredients themselves.

== Ingredients ==
=== Vegetables ===
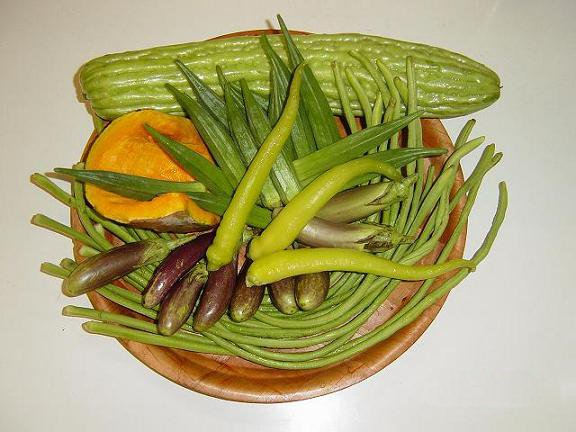
Pinakbet vegetables: shown are bitter melon, calabaza squash, okra, eggplants, string beans, and chili

Ilocano cuisine is characterized by dishes that are either salty or bitter, requiring rice. Original Ilocano pinakbet is seasoned with bagoóng of fermented fish (buggúong nga ikán) usually of anchovies (munámon). The dish includes bitter melon (paría). These two ingredients define the inclinations of the Ilocano palate.

Other typical vegetables include eggplant (taróng), tomato (kamátis), okra, string beans (utóng), chilis (síli), hyacinth beans (párda), winged beans (pállang), and others. Root crops and some beans like sweet potato (kamótig), lima beans (patáni), pigeon peas (kárdis) are optionally added. Aromatics such as ginger (layá), shallots (sibúyas), and garlic (báwang) are commonly added. Many of these vegetables are easily accessible and are grown in the backyards and gardens of most Ilocano households.

Smaller vegetables are left whole or partially sliced in half (okra, tomatoes, chilis, hyacinth beans, smaller varieties of bitter melon and eggplants, aromatics), larger vegetables are cut into finger-length size (thinner eggplants, yardlong beans, winged beans), chopped into smaller chunks (larger varieties of bitter melon, sweet potatoes), and beans shelled from their pods (lima, pigeon peas).

Absent from this list is calabaza (karabasa). Although widely grown in the Ilocos region, historically the cooking of calabaza was omitted from pinakbet because it took longer to cook in a claypot over a wood fire, compared to the other vegetables.

=== Seasonings ===
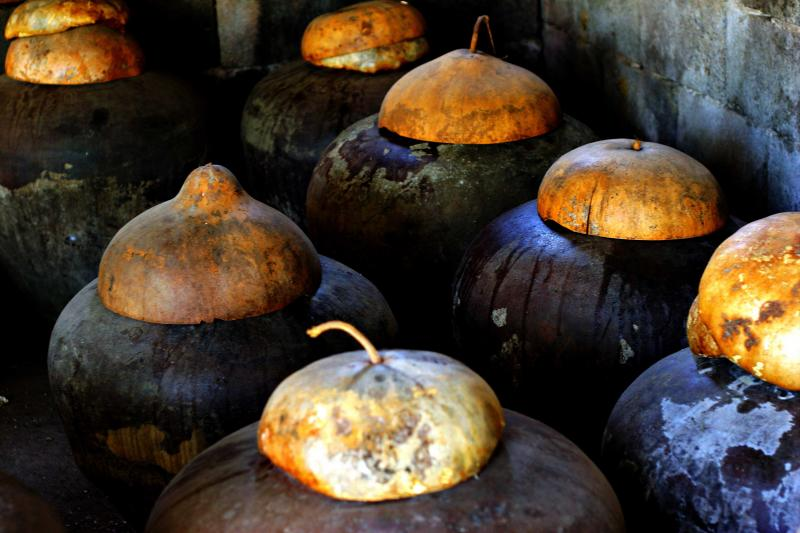
Bugguóng fermenting in burnáy— the main ingredient of pinakbet.

Bagoong provides the base. However, dried whole krill or smaller shrimp (áramang), larger headless dried shrimp (hébi), and dried anchovies, can be used to further enhance the broth similar to Japanese dashi (出汁) or Korean dasima (다시마) without having to use MSG. Other than for the aromatic vegetables (garlic, ginger, shallots), no other flavoring enhancers and spices such as peppercorns or bay leaves are used.

=== Meat and seafood ===
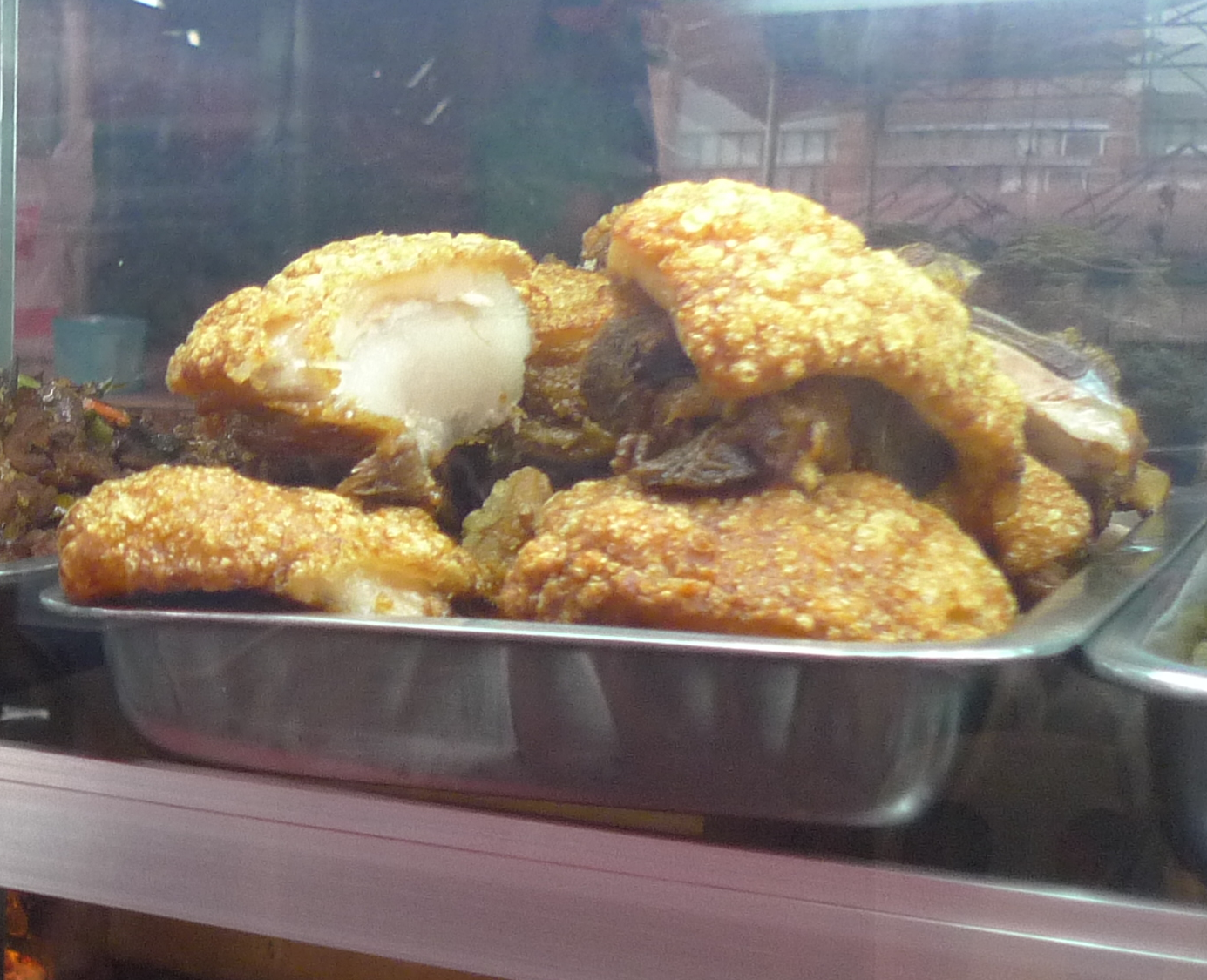
Bagnet, a pork belly boiled and deep-fried until crispy

Pinakbet remains a straightforward vegetable dish containing no meat. In Ilocano cuisine, meats are typically prepared separately on their own, as in adobo or dinuguan (dinárdaraan), which contains no vegetables (or very few).

Rather, meats including fish can be added as a garnish (ságpaw), typically stale or leftover lechon (lítson), chicharron (bágnet or tsitsarón) or fried fish (príto nga ikán). Rare and highly prized ingredients of fresh shrimp (pasáyan) or prawns (udáng) could also be used as sagpaw, when available.

== Cooking ==
Fats or oils are not used in the original preparation, either for the vegetables or proteins. The vegetables are cooked in a method between shallow boiling and steaming. A small amount of water is boiled in a pot (bánga). Some of this water is added to a bowl containing a small amount of buggúong. The buggúong is macerated with the water to be dissolved. This mixture is then strained over the pot to remove fish debris such as bones to create a fish broth. The aromatics are added to add furthe flavor to the fish broth, and optionally seasoned with dried shrimp or anchovies, followed by the vegetables. To mix, the vegetables are gently tossed within the pot without the use of a utensil to keep them relatively intact. As its name suggests, these vegetables are cooked until "shriveled". Leftover meats or seafood garnishes can be added near the end of the cooking time.

== Similar and related dishes ==
=== Related dishes ===
- Dinengdeng — similar Ilocano vegetable dish
- Kinilnat — Ilocano blanched vegetable salad
- Sinabawang gulay — Filipino vegetable soup

=== Other vegetable stews ===
- Buddha's delight — Chinese vegetarian dish
- Caponata — Sicilian dish of eggplants and other vegetables
- Ghivetch — Balkan vegetable stew
- Ratatouille — French stew of similar preparation
- Türlü — Turkish stewed vegetables
