= Dinengdeng =

Filipino soup-based dish

Dinengdéng
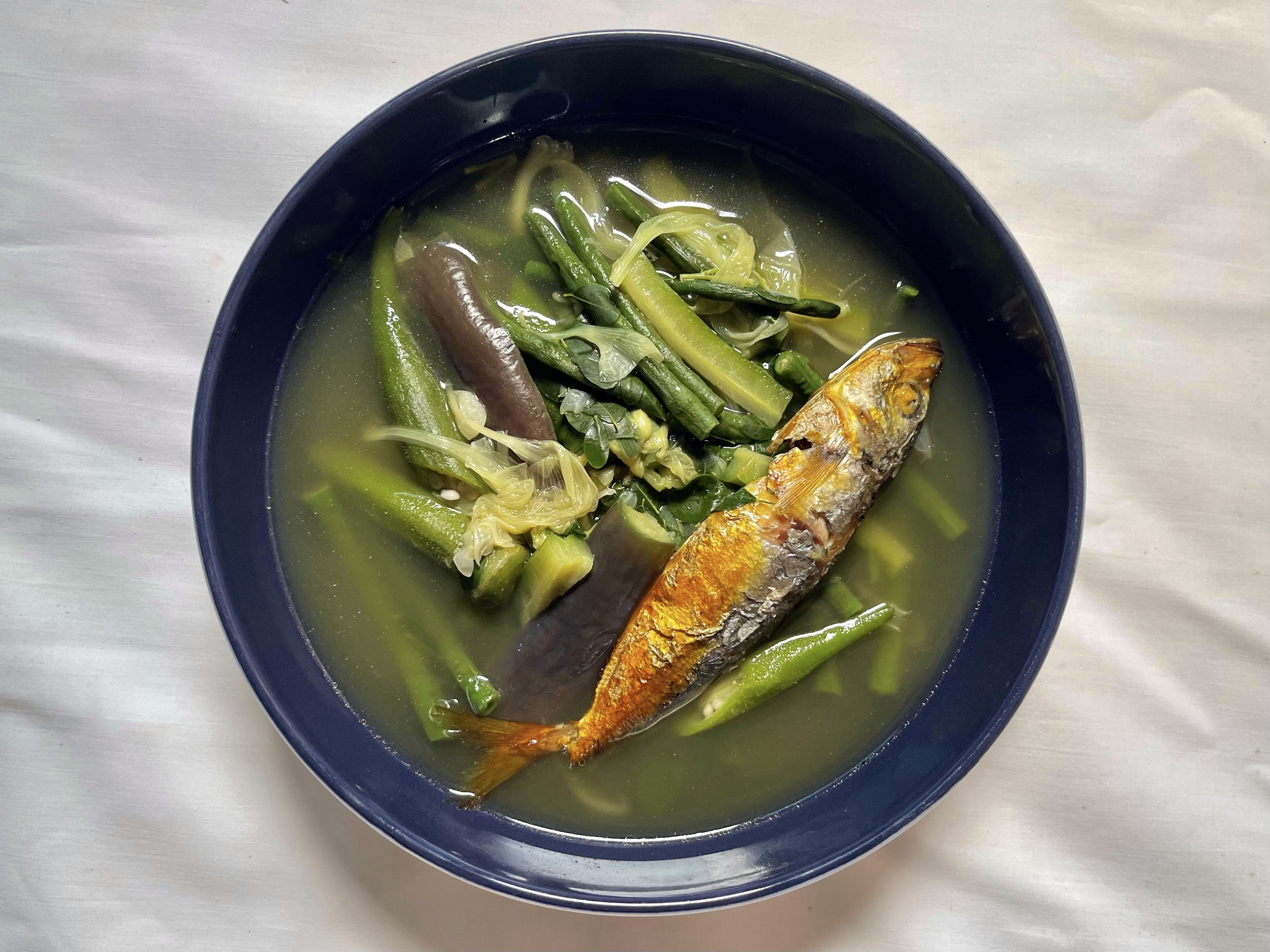
- A variation of dinengdéng prepared with long beans, bitter gourd, eggplant, vegetable hummingbird, moringa flowers and leaves, and smoked fish all flavored with buggúong.
- Alternative names: Inabráw
- Course: Main course
- Place of origin: Philippines
- Region or state: Ilocos Region
- Associated cuisine: Filipino cuisine
- Serving temperature: Hot, Warm temperature
- Main ingredients: Bagoong isda (fermented fish sauce), vegetables (leaves, fruits, flowers, and legumes), grilled or fried fish, and dried shrimp.
- Variations: Buridibod, Sari-sari
- Similar dishes: Pinakbet, Sinabawang gulay, Bulanglang, Laswa

Dinengdeng, also known as inabráw, is a traditional Filipino vegetable-based dish. It is characterized by a savory and earthy flavor, largely derived from fermented anchovy fish sauce (buggúong or bagoong isda), which provides a distinct salty umami taste. The dish typically includes a combination of lowland vegetables—such as leaves, fruits, flowers, and legumes—like okra, long beans, eggplant, moringa leaves, bitter gourd, and jute leaves, and may be cooked with grilled or fried fish or dried shrimp. It is commonly served as a main course and eaten with steamed rice. Originating from the Ilocos Region of northwestern Luzon, Philippines, it remains a staple of Ilocano cuisine.

Dinengdeng has numerous regional and seasonal variations, depending on the combination of vegetables used. Buridibod is one such variation and is typically prepared with sweet potato and moringa fruit. Pinakbet is a related dish prepared with similar vegetables but less liquid. Dinengdeng is also comparable to sinabawang gulay, bulanglang, and laswa, which typically use salt or patis to taste instead of bagoong isda.

== Etymology ==
The name dinengdéng comes from the Ilocano word dengdéng, which means “to cook vegetables” or “to boil vegetables in fermented anchovy sauce (buggúong).” It generally refers to vegetables cooked in a broth or sauce.

The alternative name inabráw has the same meaning, derived from the Ilocano root word abráw, meaning “to cook vegetables.”

== Ingredients ==
Dinengdeng highlights the distinct umami flavor of bugguóng munamón (fermented anchovy). This essential ingredient serves as the primary seasoning, giving the dish its characteristic depth and savories. It consists of a variety of fresh vegetables, including leafy greens, shoots, blossoms, legumes, and fruits. Many of these ingredients are readily available and commonly grown in the backyards and gardens of Ilocano households.

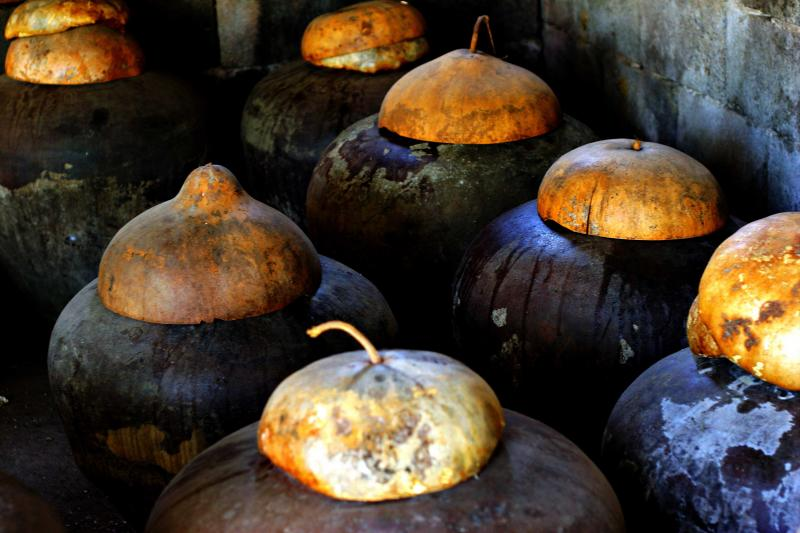
Bugguóng fermenting in burnáy— the main ingredient of dinengdeng.

Dried shrimp or dried fish are often added to enhance the flavor of the broth. Leftover meats can also be incorporated to enrich the dish, a practice known as sagpaw or garnish. These additions may include fried or roasted fish, bagnet (Ilocano crispy pork belly), lechon (roast pig), or even fast-food fried chicken. Dinengdeng can be further seasoned with aromatics such as báwang (garlic), lasoná (native shallots), or layá (ginger). For a touch of acidity, ingredients like kamatis (tomatoes) or piás (bilimbi) may be added.

During the monsoon season, Dinengdeng incorporates ingredients that thrive in the wet climate. These include bamboo shoots (rabong), which provide a crunchy texture and earthy flavor; edible vine flowers (sabidukong), which enhance the dish's aroma with a floral note; and wild mushrooms (u-ong), which add a chewy, umami-rich element to the soup. These seasonal ingredients are often foraged, reflecting the Ilocano ingenuity in utilizing the natural environment.

In coastal areas, Dinengdeng is often enriched with seaweed varieties such as kulot (Gelidiella acerosa) a curly, soft-textured seaweed and aragan or panpan-aw (a coarse-textured seaweed with a briny taste). These additions contribute a distinct oceanic flavor that pairs well with the savory bugguóng (fermented fish paste) broth.

The dish may contain a numerous combination of the following vegetables:

- Aba (taro), corms
- Alukon (Broussonetia luzonica), blossoms
- Balangkoy (cassava), tubers
- Balatong (mung beans), dried beans
- Bukel ti otong (black-eyed peas), dried beans
- Daludal (taro), shoots
- Kabatiti (luffa), gourd
- Kalunay (amaranth), leaves
- Kamotig (sweet potato), tubers and leaves
- Karabasa (calabaza), squash, blossoms, young shoots
- Kardis (pigeon pea), shelled beans
- Katuday (West-Indian pea), shelled beans
- Kutsay (garlic chives), leaves
- Mais (sweet corn), cobs
- Marunggay (moringa), leaves and pods
- Okra (okra), fruit
- Otong (black-eyed peas), young pods
- Otong (snakebeans), young pods
- Pallang (winged bean), fruit
- Parda (parda bean), young pods
- Parya (bittermelon), leaves and unripe fruit
- Patani (lima beans), shelled beans
- Rabanos (rat-tail radish), pods
- Rabong (bamboo shoots), shoots
- Sabunganay (banana), blossoms
- Saluyot (jute), leaves
- Sayote (chayote), fruit and young shoots
- Sili (chili peppers), leaves and unripe fruits
- Tabungaw (bottle gourd), gourd
- Talilong (Talinum), shoots
- Tangkoy (winter melon), gourd
- Tarong (eggplant), fruit
- Tugi (yams), and wild potatoes
- Uong (mushrooms)
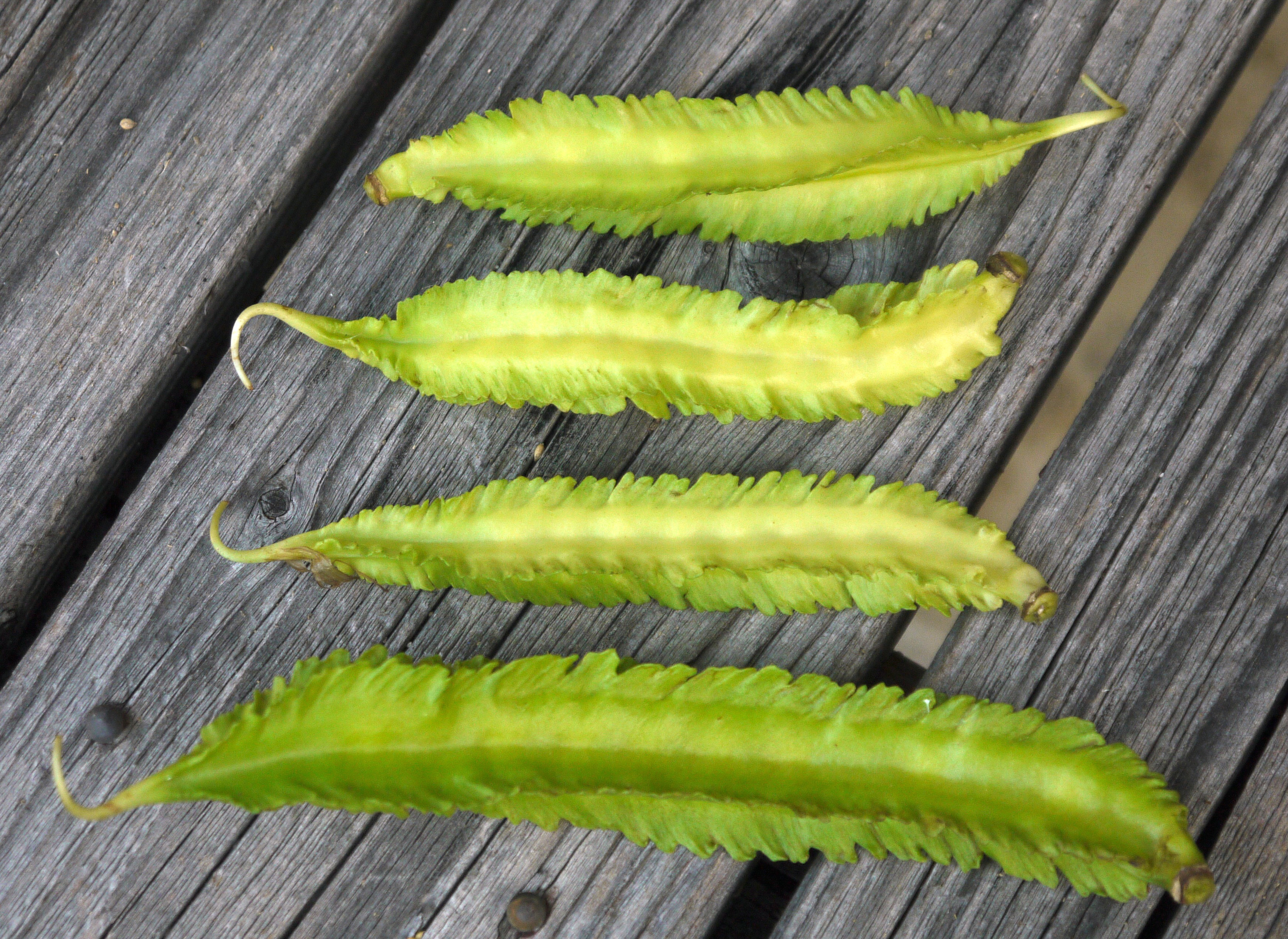
Winged Bean (Ilo: Pallang or Tlg: Sigarilyas)

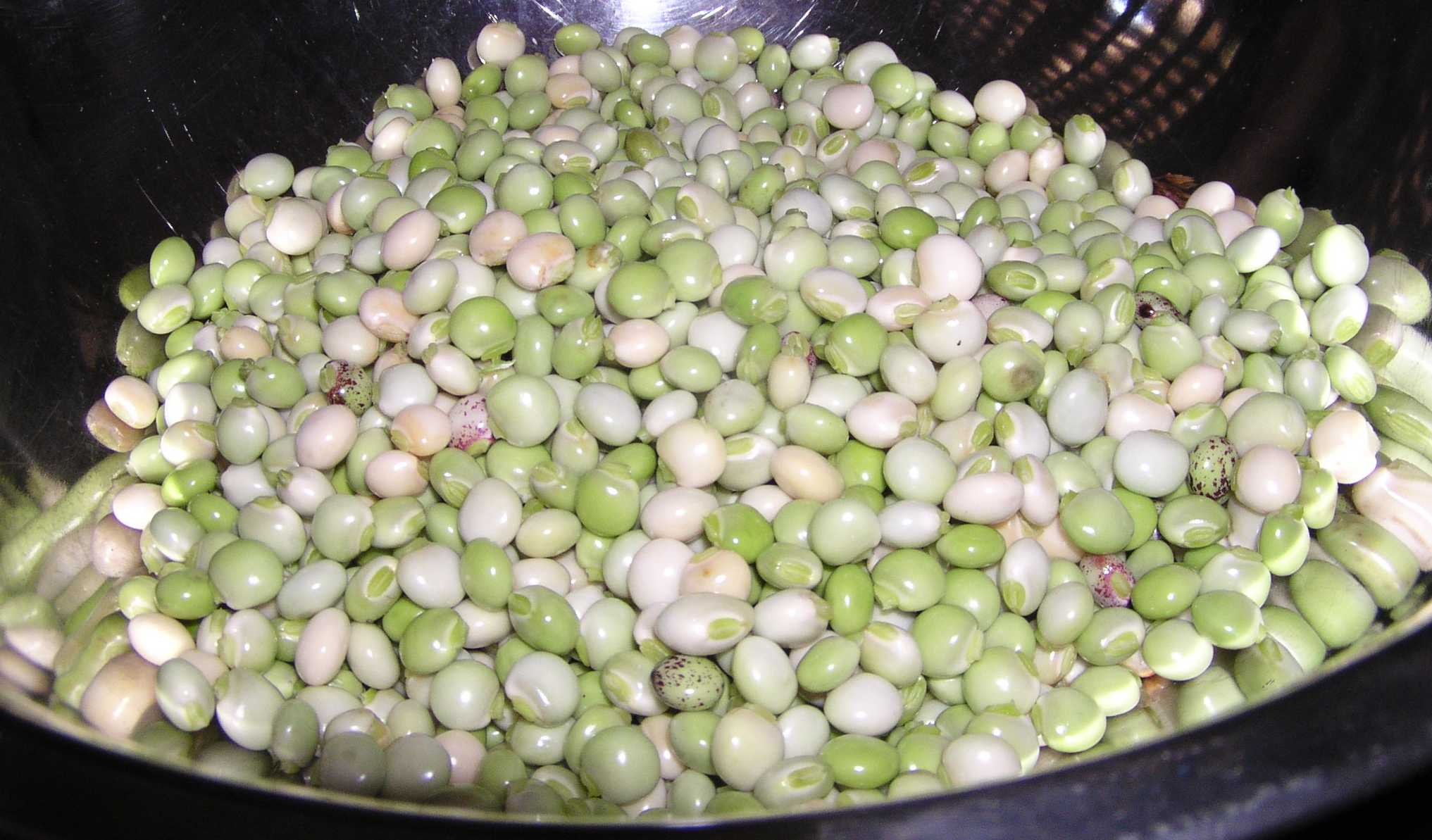
Pigeon Peas (Ilo: Cardis or Tlg: Kadyos)

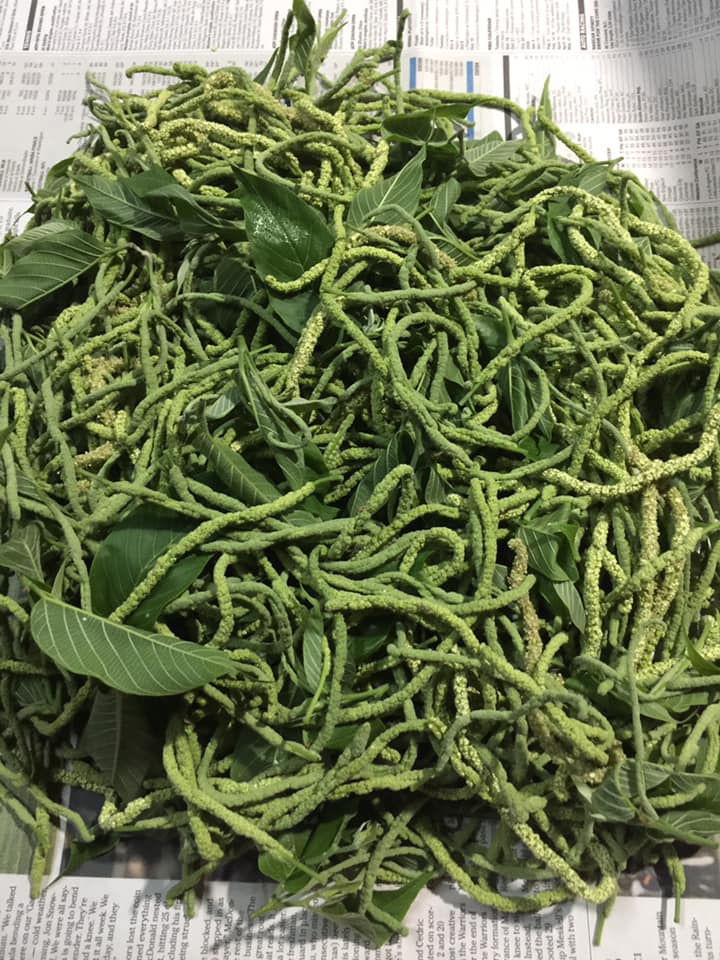
Birch Flower (Ilo: Allukon, Bunngon or Tlg: Himbabao)

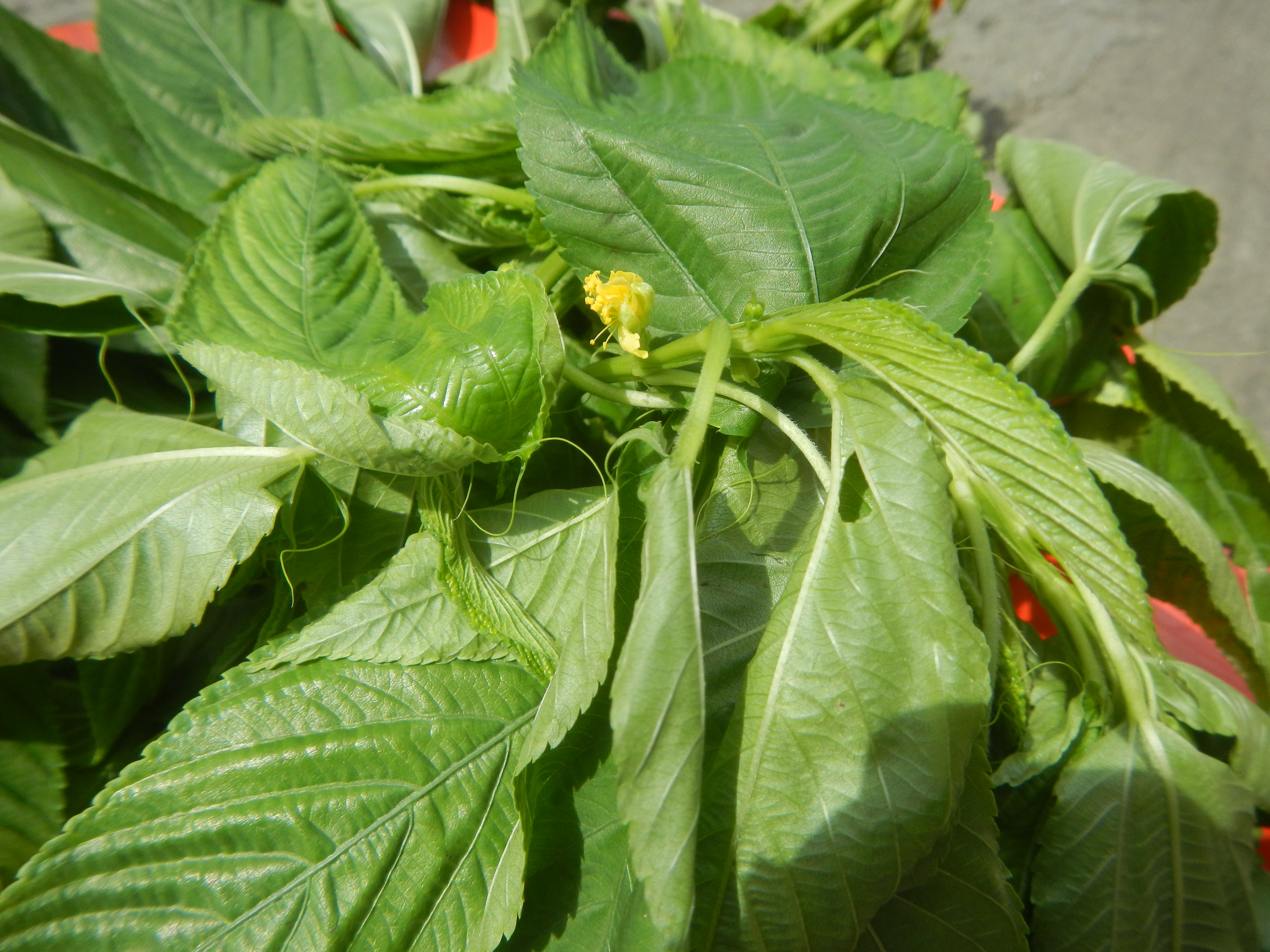
Jute leaves (Ilo: Saluyot)

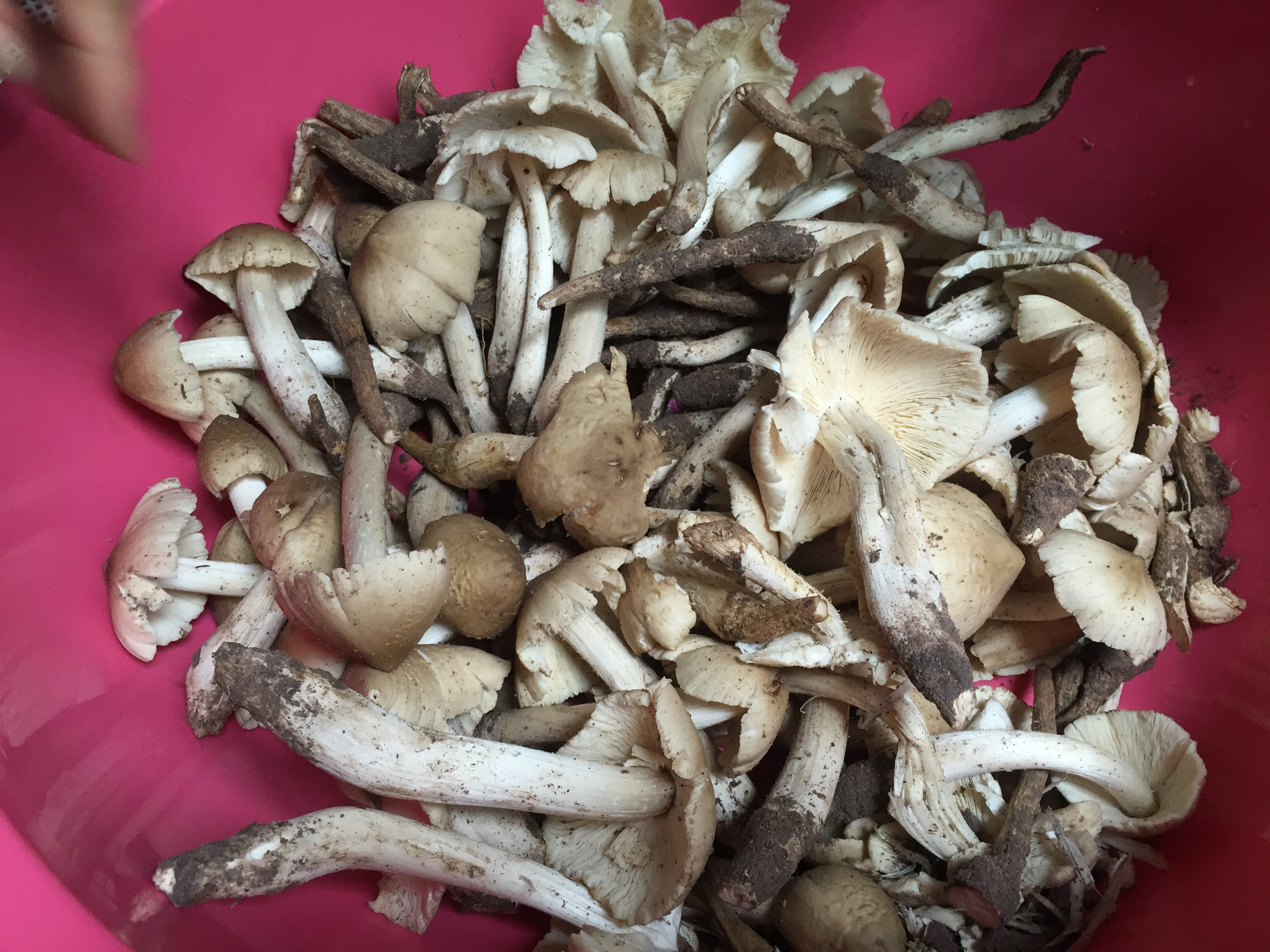
Mushroom (Ilo: Uuong or Tlg: Kabute)

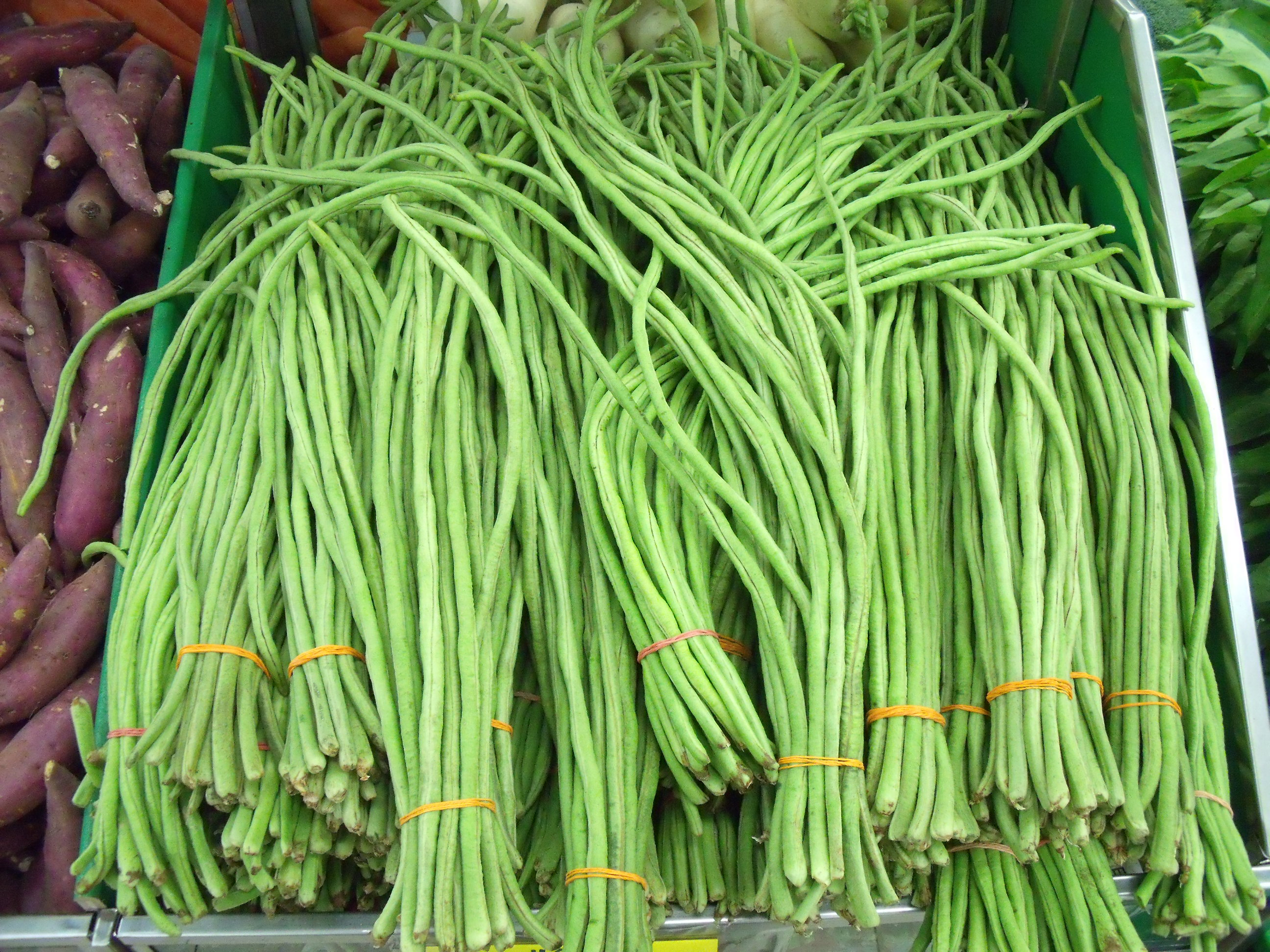
Long Beans (Ilo: Otong or Tlg: Sitaw)

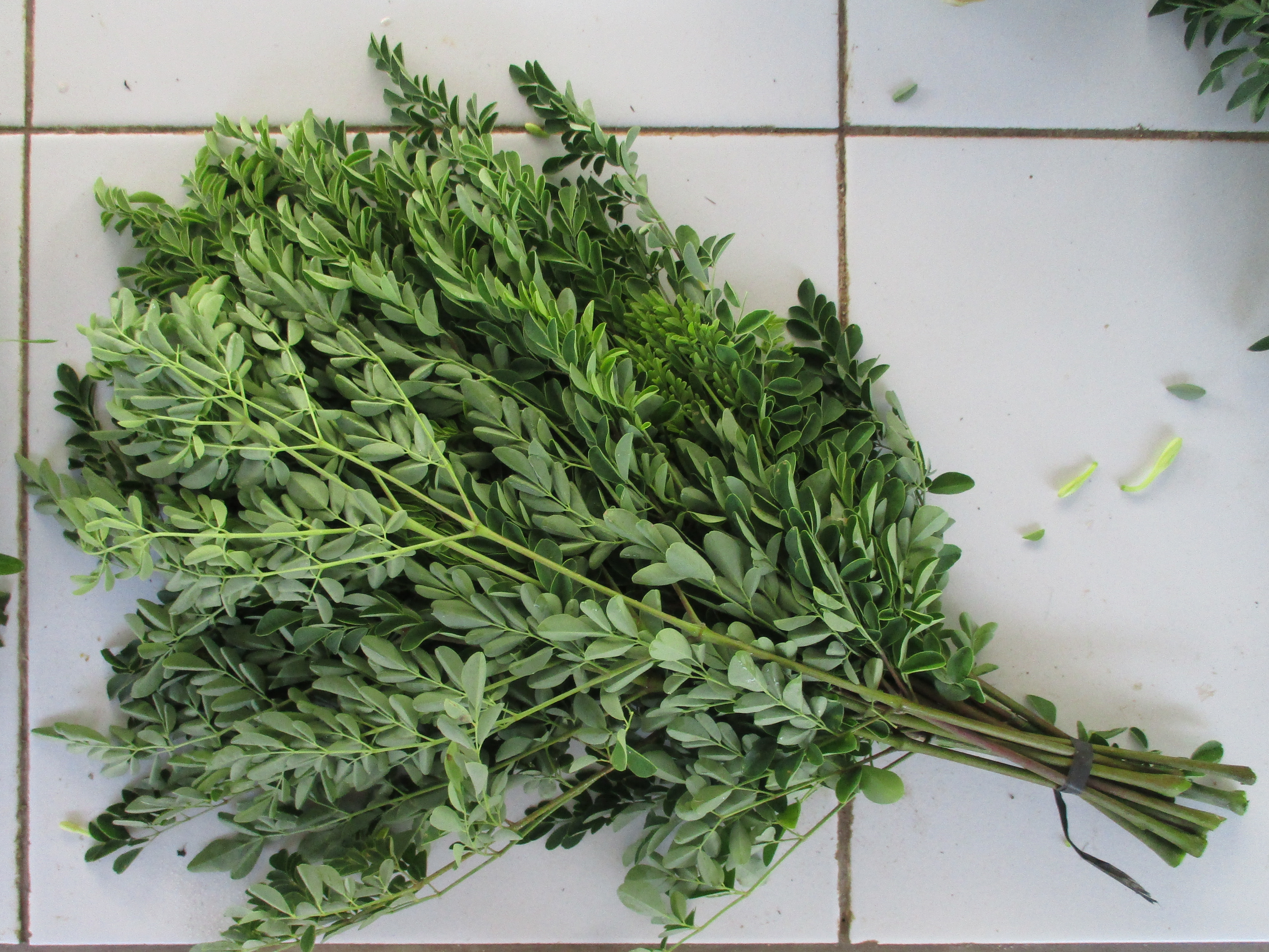
Moringa leaves (Ilo: Marunggay or Tlg: Malungay)

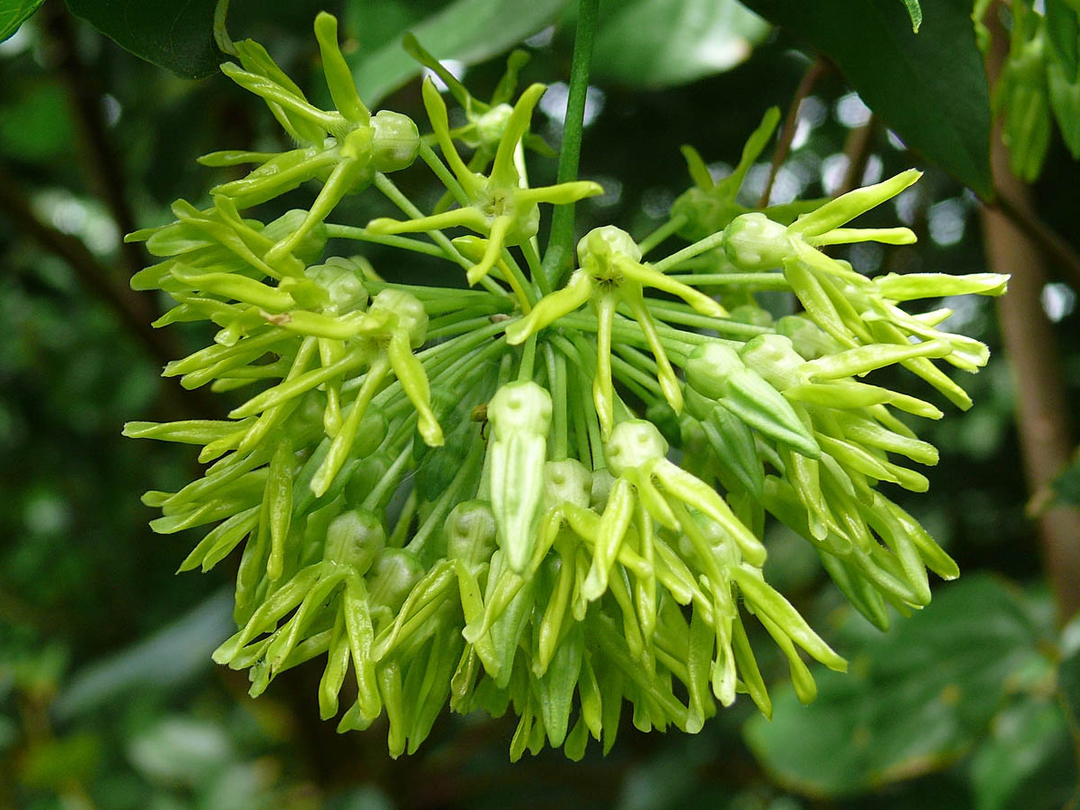
Sabidukong or Bagbagkong

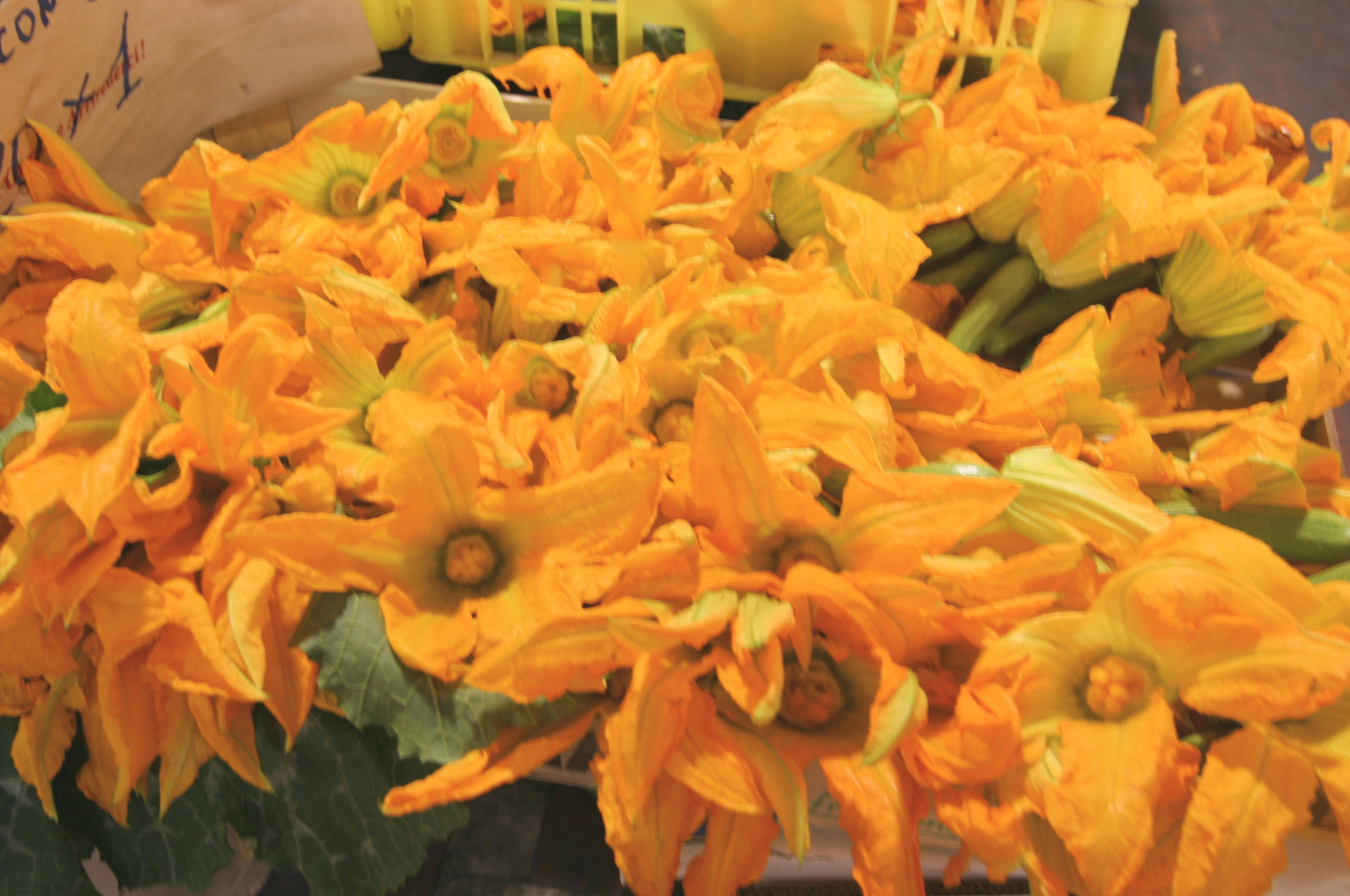
Squash Blossom (Ilo: Sabong Karabasa)

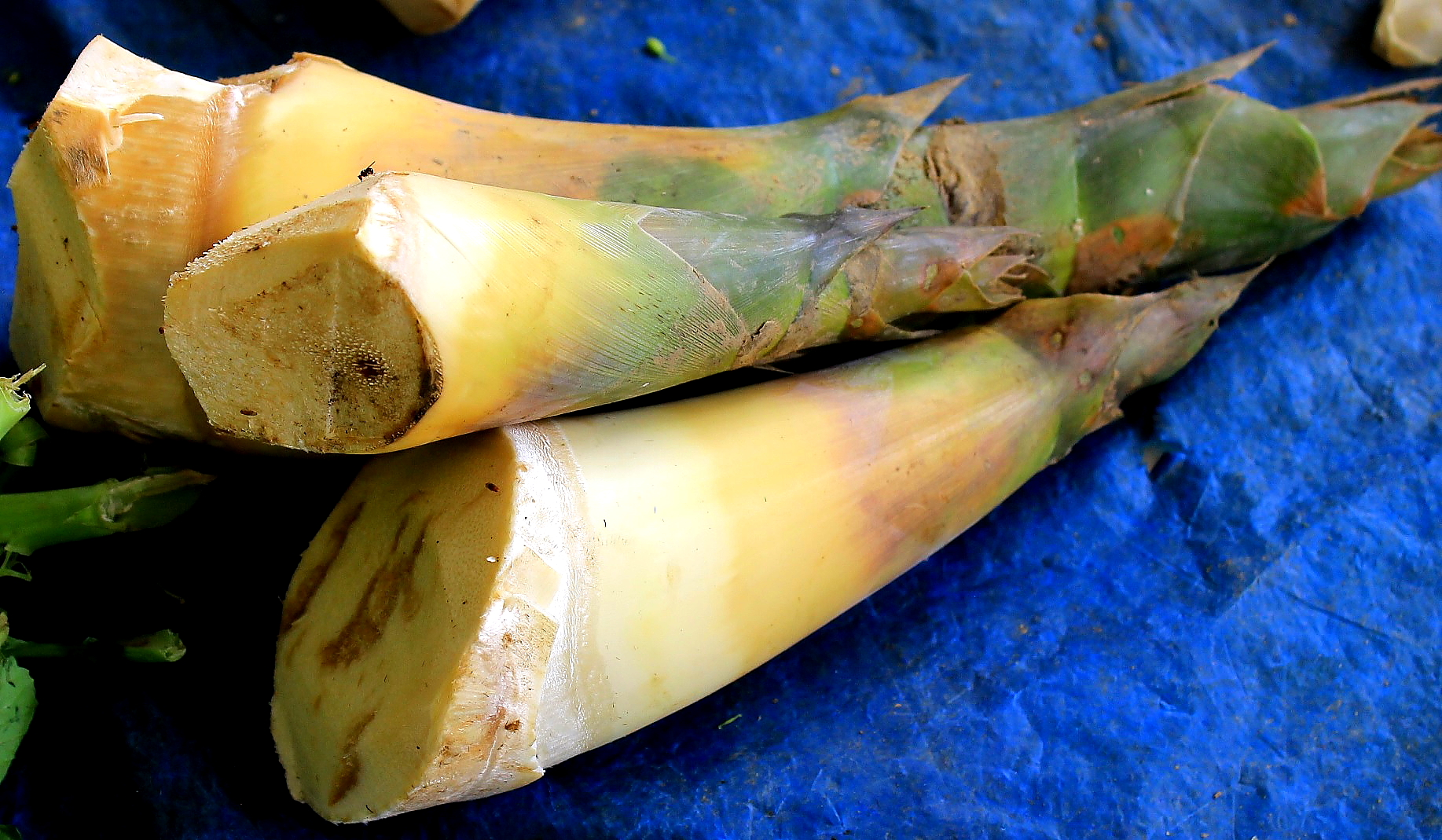
Bamboo Shoot (Ilo: Rabong or Tlg: Labong)

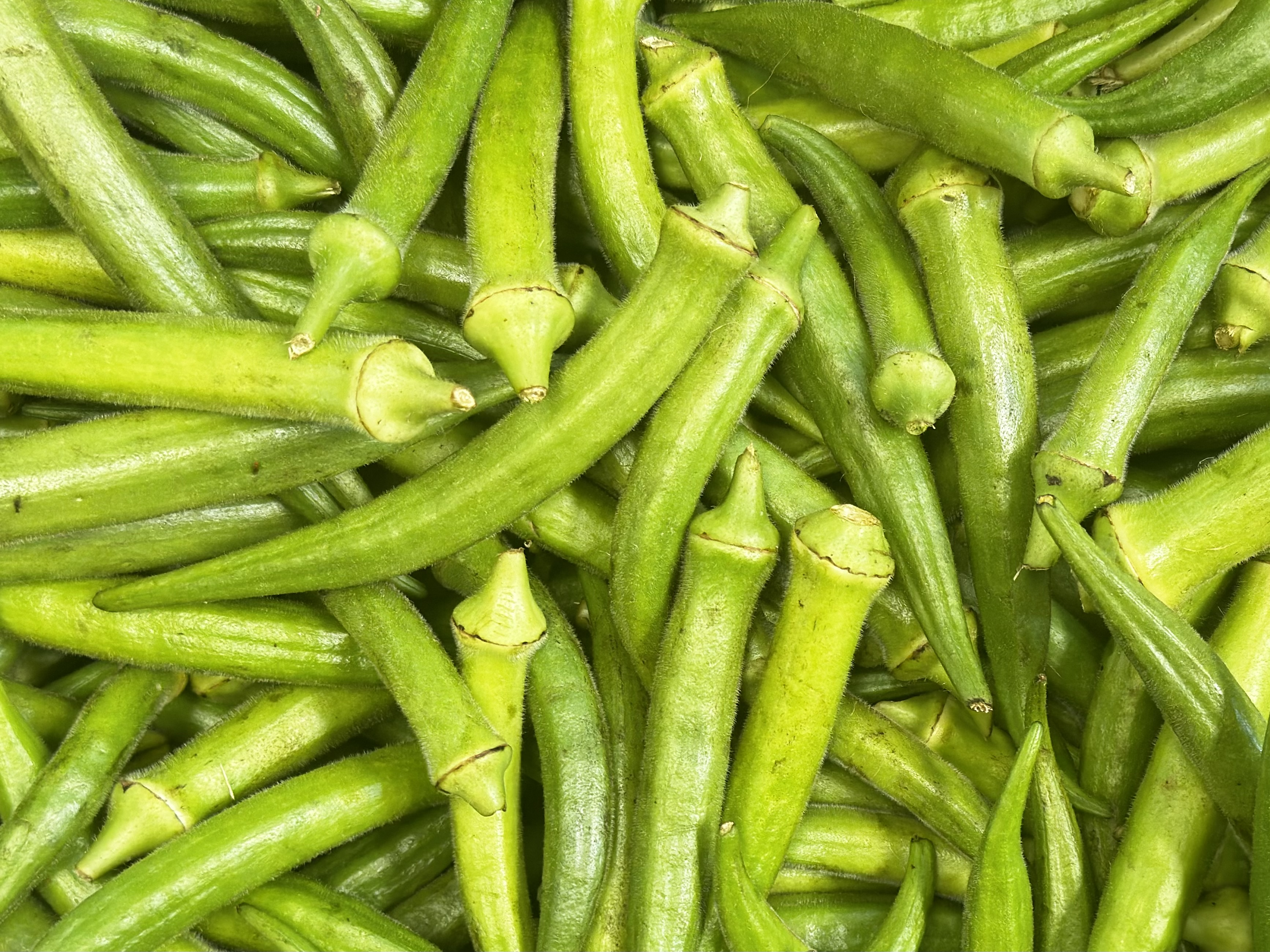
Okra

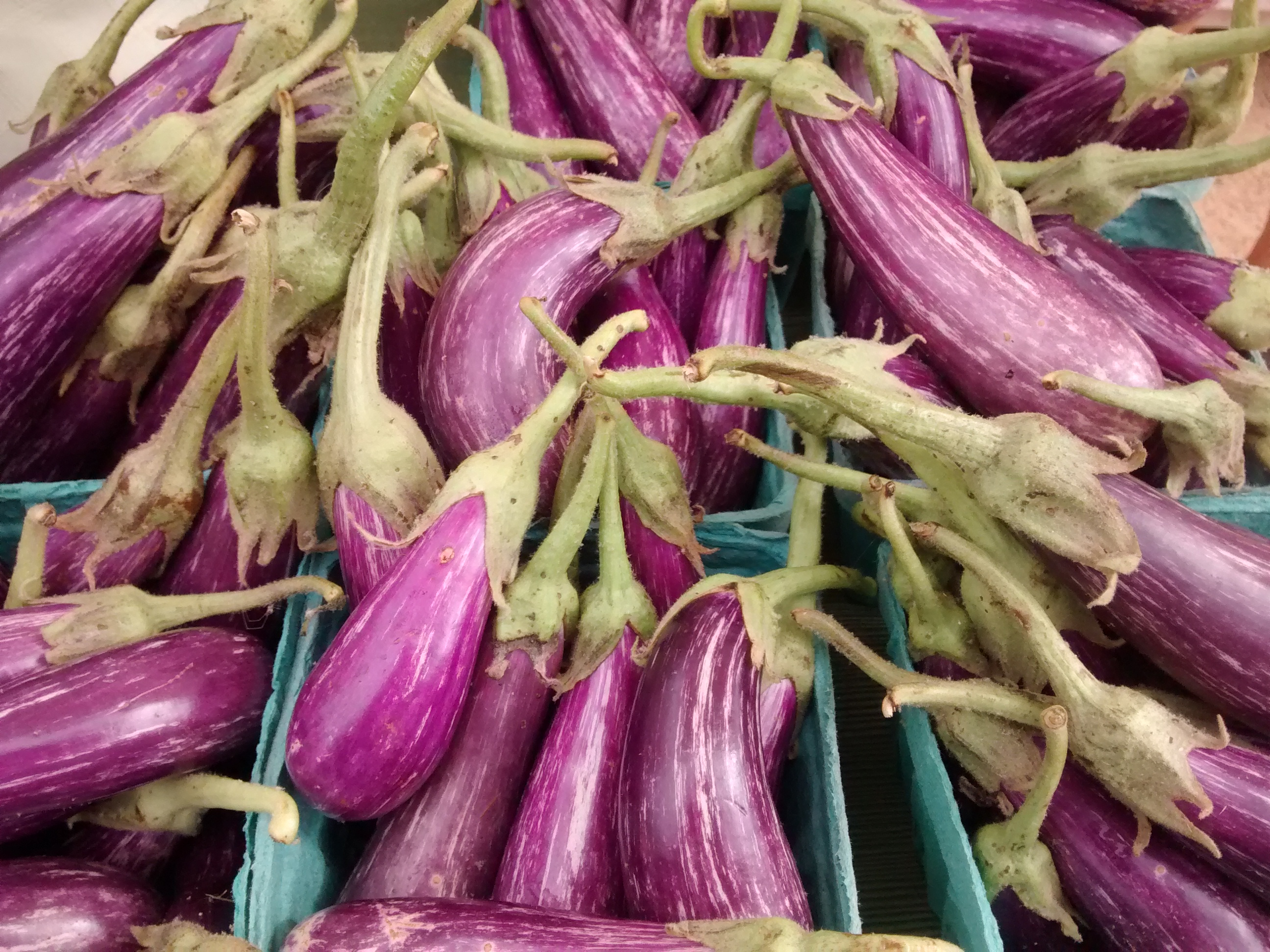
Eggplant (Ilo: Tarong or Tlg: Talong)

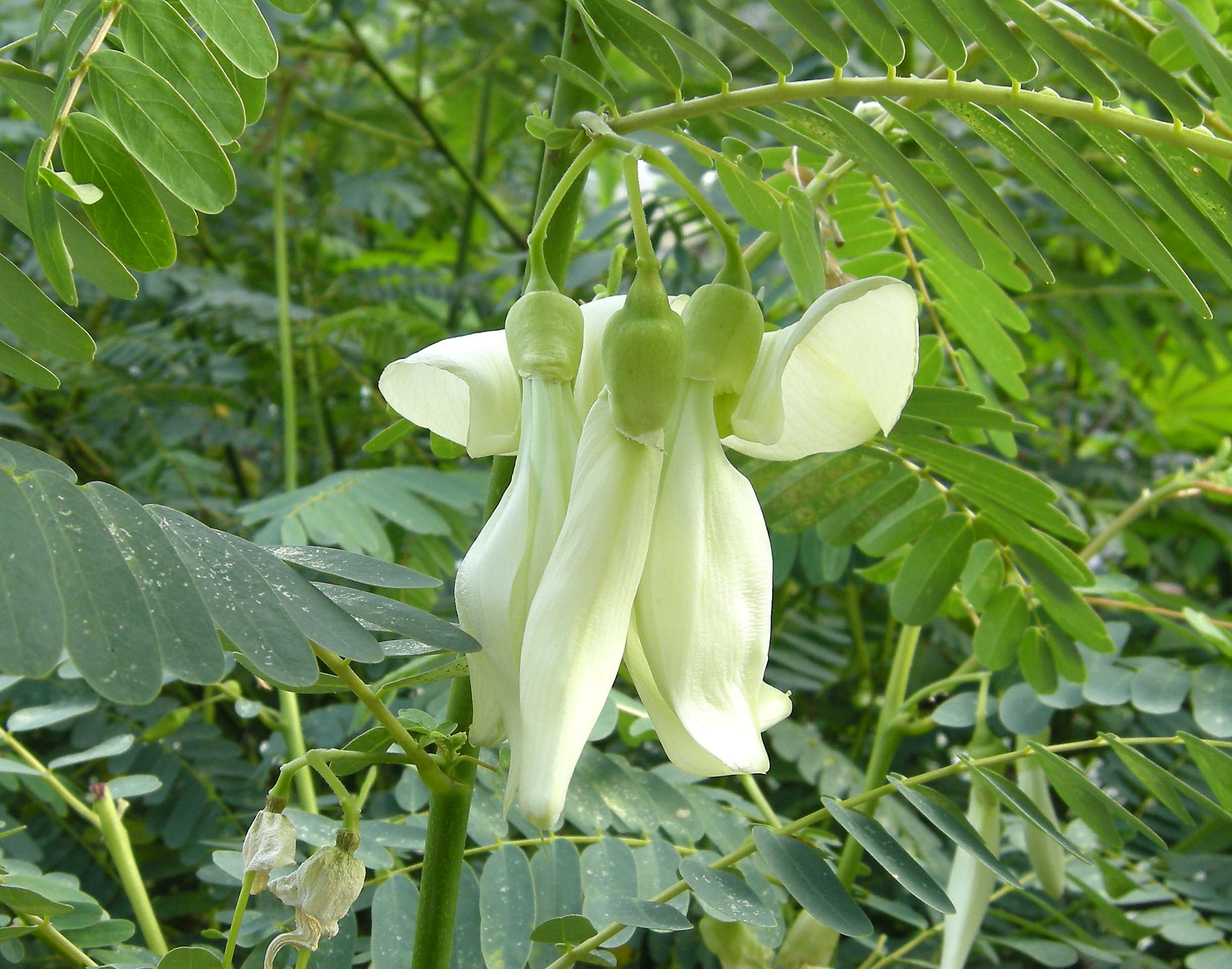
Vegetable Hummingbird (Ilo: Katuday or Tlg: Katuray)

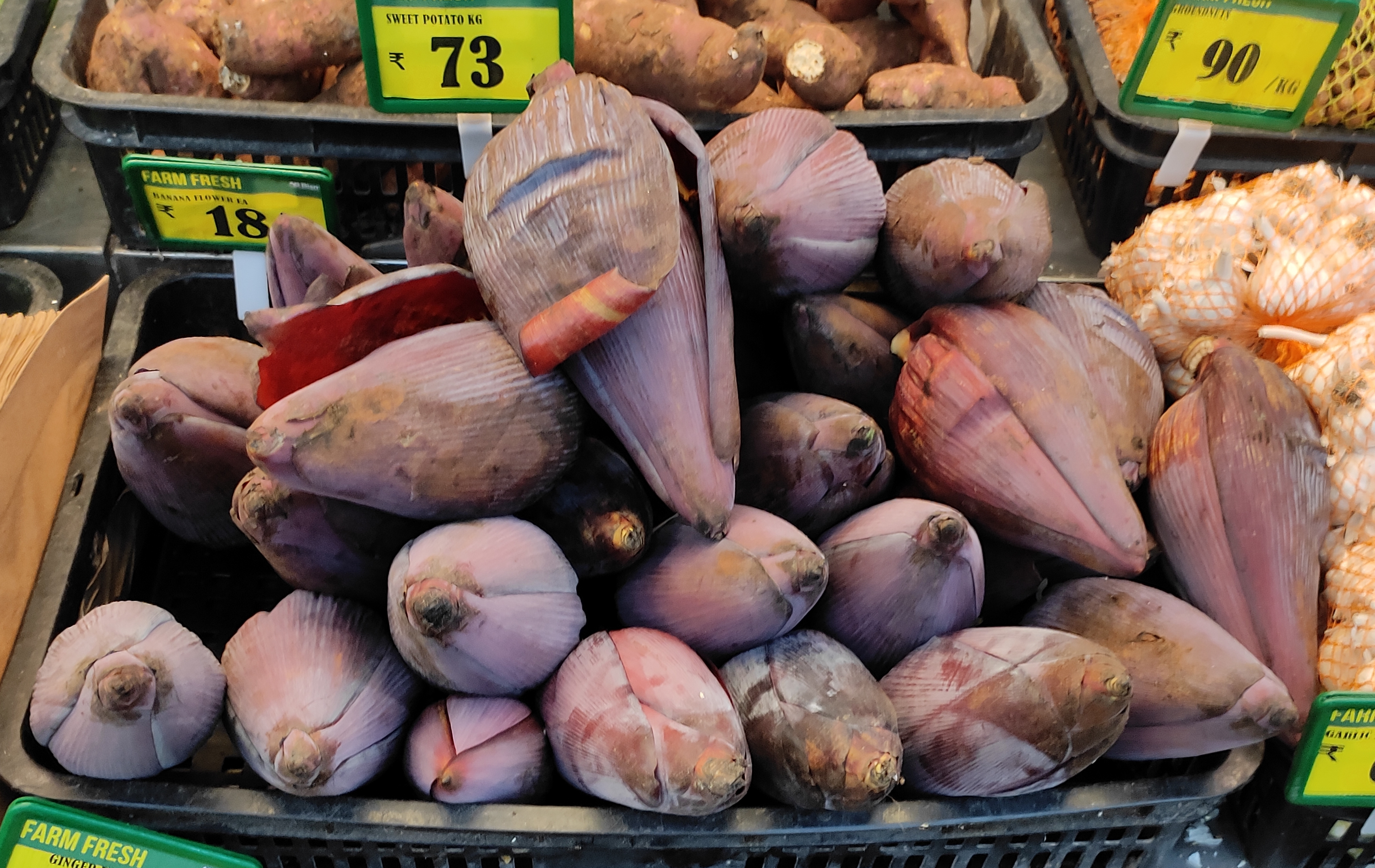
Banana Blossom (Ilo: Sabunganay)

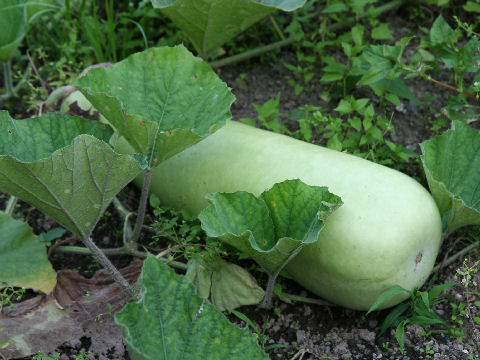
Bottle Gourd (Ilo: Tabungaw or Tlg: Upo)

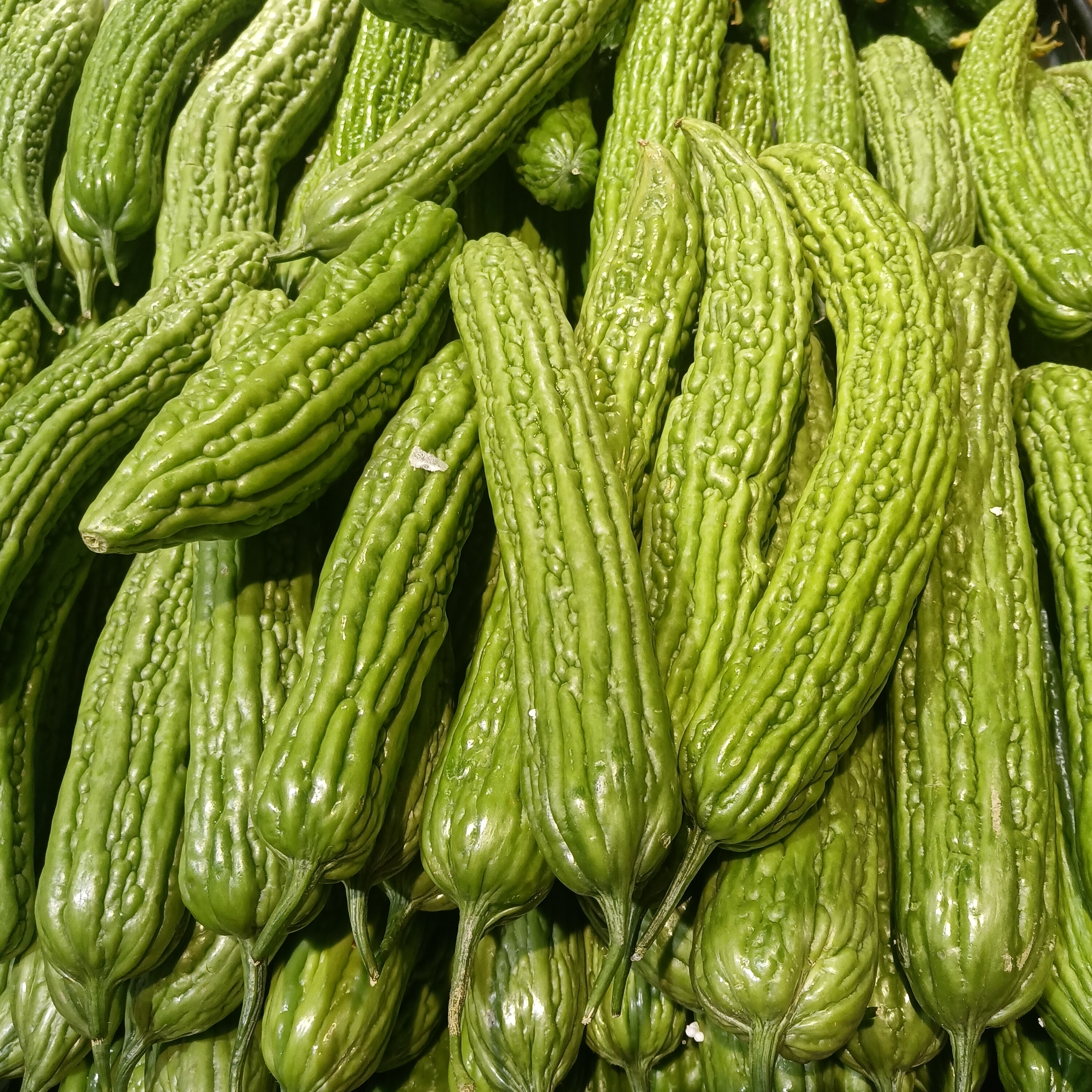
Bitter Gourd (Ilo: Parya or Tlg: Ampalaya)

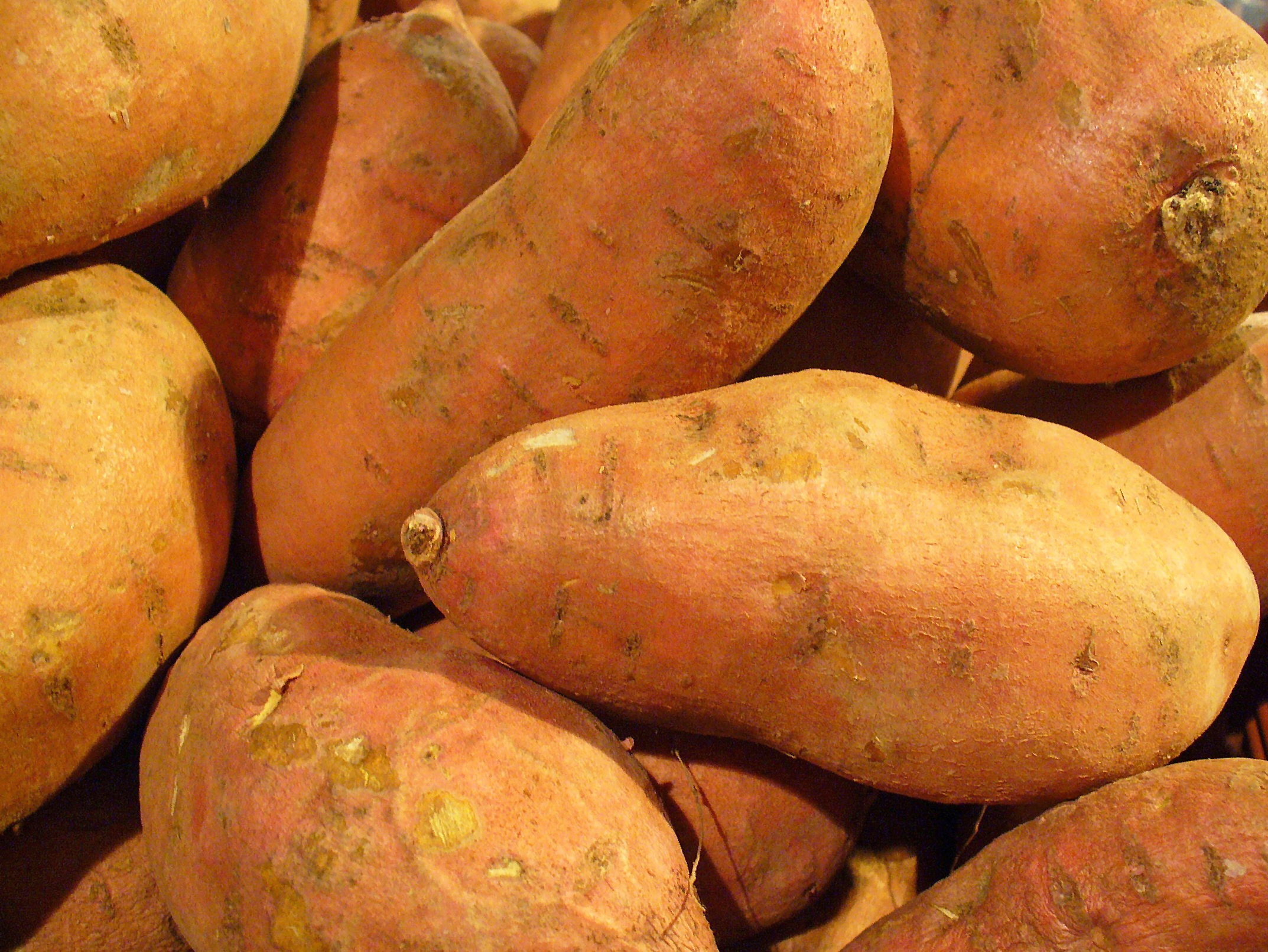
Sweet Potato (Kamote)

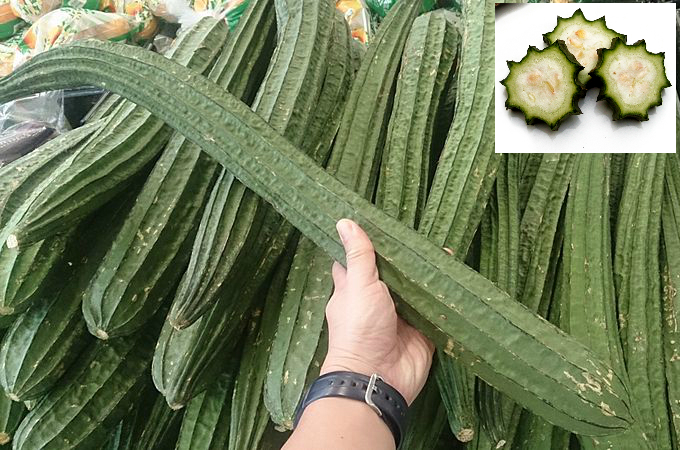
Luffa (Ilo: Kabatiti or Tlg: Patola)

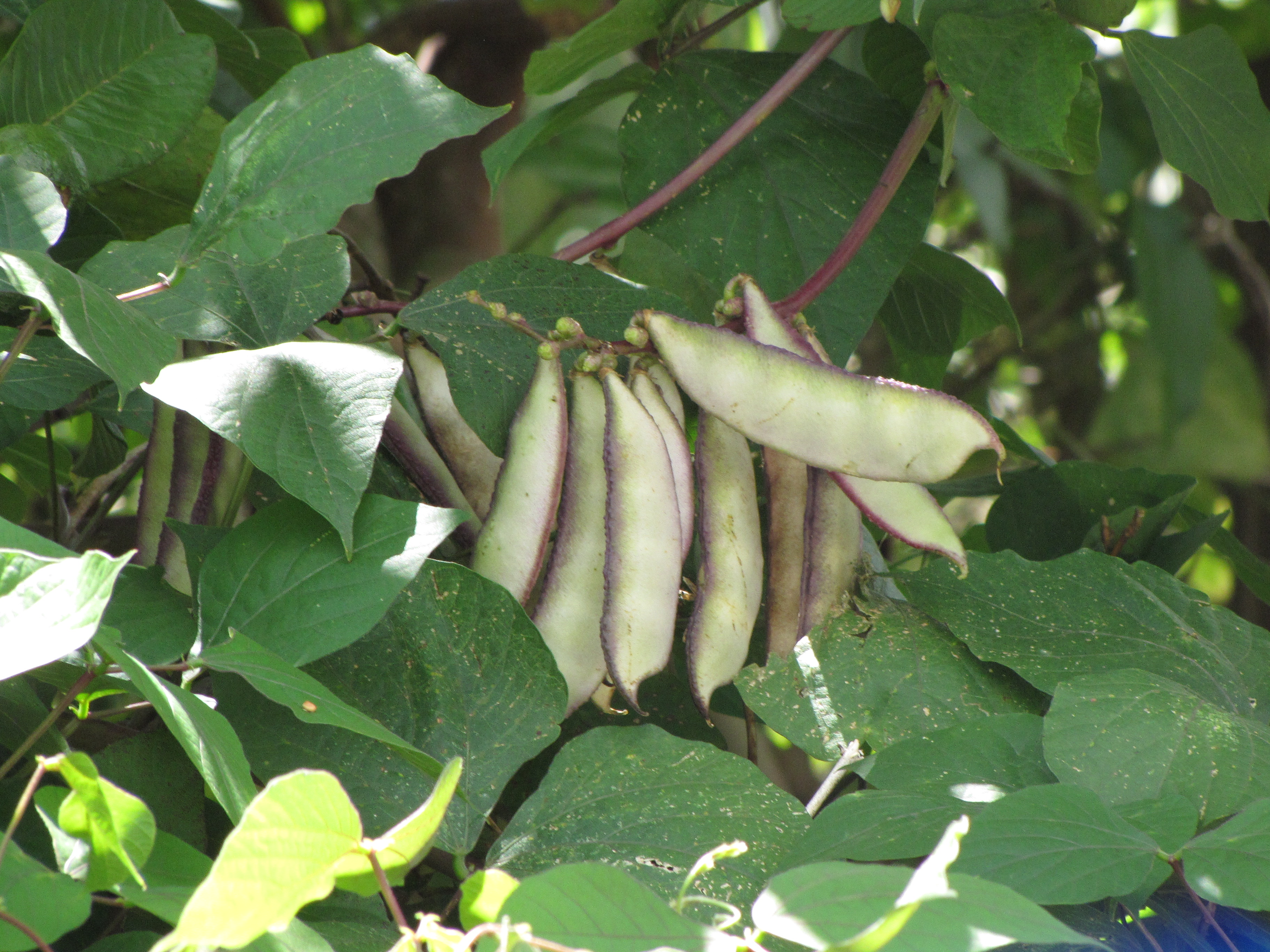
Hyacinth Beans (Ilo: Parda or Tlg: Bataw)

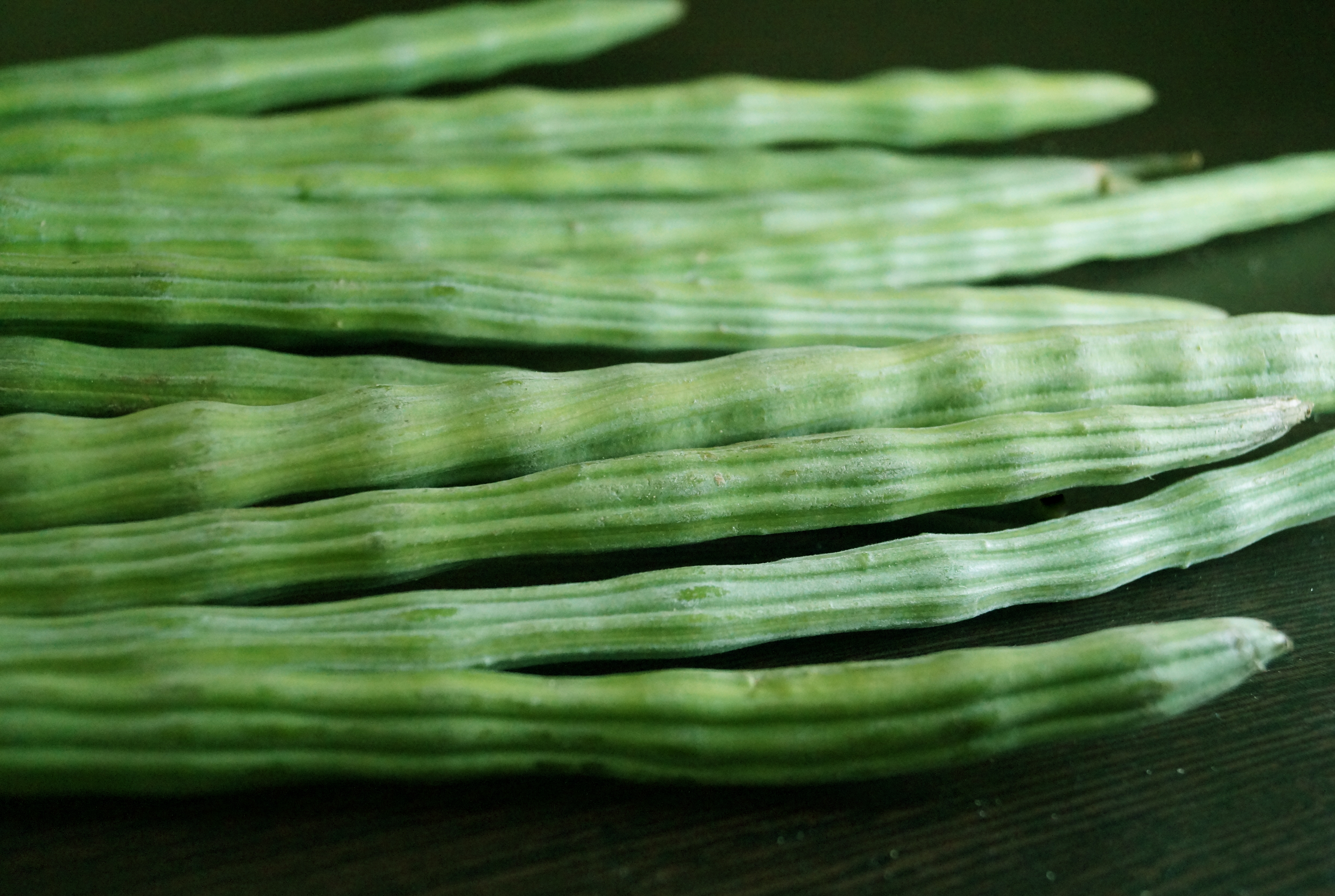
Moringga Fruit (Ilo: Bunga marunggay)

== Variations ==
Dinengdeng is characterized by its versatility and numerous variations, which are influenced by regional, seasonal, and cultural factors, as well as personal preferences. The classic version of dinengdeng typically consists of a mixture of leafy greens, shoots, and other vegetables, including long beans (utong), okra, jute mallow (saluyot), bitter gourd (parya), sweet potato leaves (uggot kamote), and moringa leaves (marunggay). These ingredients are commonly available year-round.

=== Buridibod ===
One variation of Dinengdeng is buridibod, which prominently features kamotig (sweet potato tubers) as the primary ingredient. The sweet potatoes are sometimes cooked until they disintegrate, resulting in a thicker, creamier soup. The natural sweetness of the sweet potatoes complements the savory and umami flavors of the dish.

=== Sari-Sari ===
Another variation of Dinengdeng is sari-sari, which emerged within the Ilocano diaspora in Hawaii. Introduced in 1974 by Theo Butuyan of Pangasinan at his restaurant "Elena's" in Waipahu, this version includes eggplant, bottle gourd, water spinach, tomatoes, and onions. It is simmered with shrimp and crispy pork belly, creating a richer and more indulgent version of the dish while maintaining the Ilocano tradition of utilizing locally available ingredients.

== In popular culture ==
=== Dinengdeng Festival ===
The annual "Dinengdeng Festival" is the official festive event of the municipality of Agoo, La Union, Philippines held in the summer. The festival is held in celebration of the dish and to promote tourism. A large banga (clay pot) is used symbolize the festival, called the "Big Banga". It is used during the event in cooking the dinengdeng.

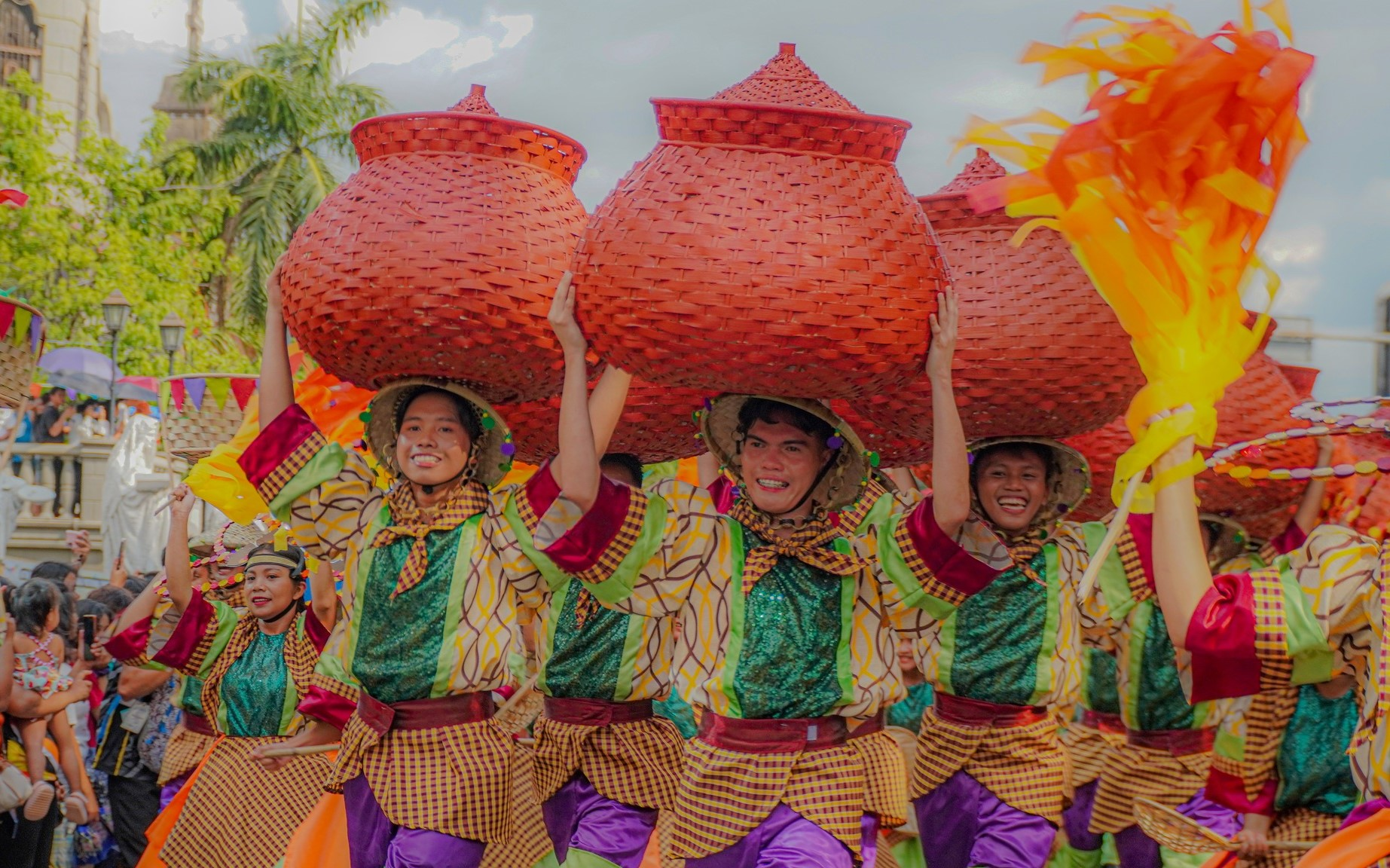
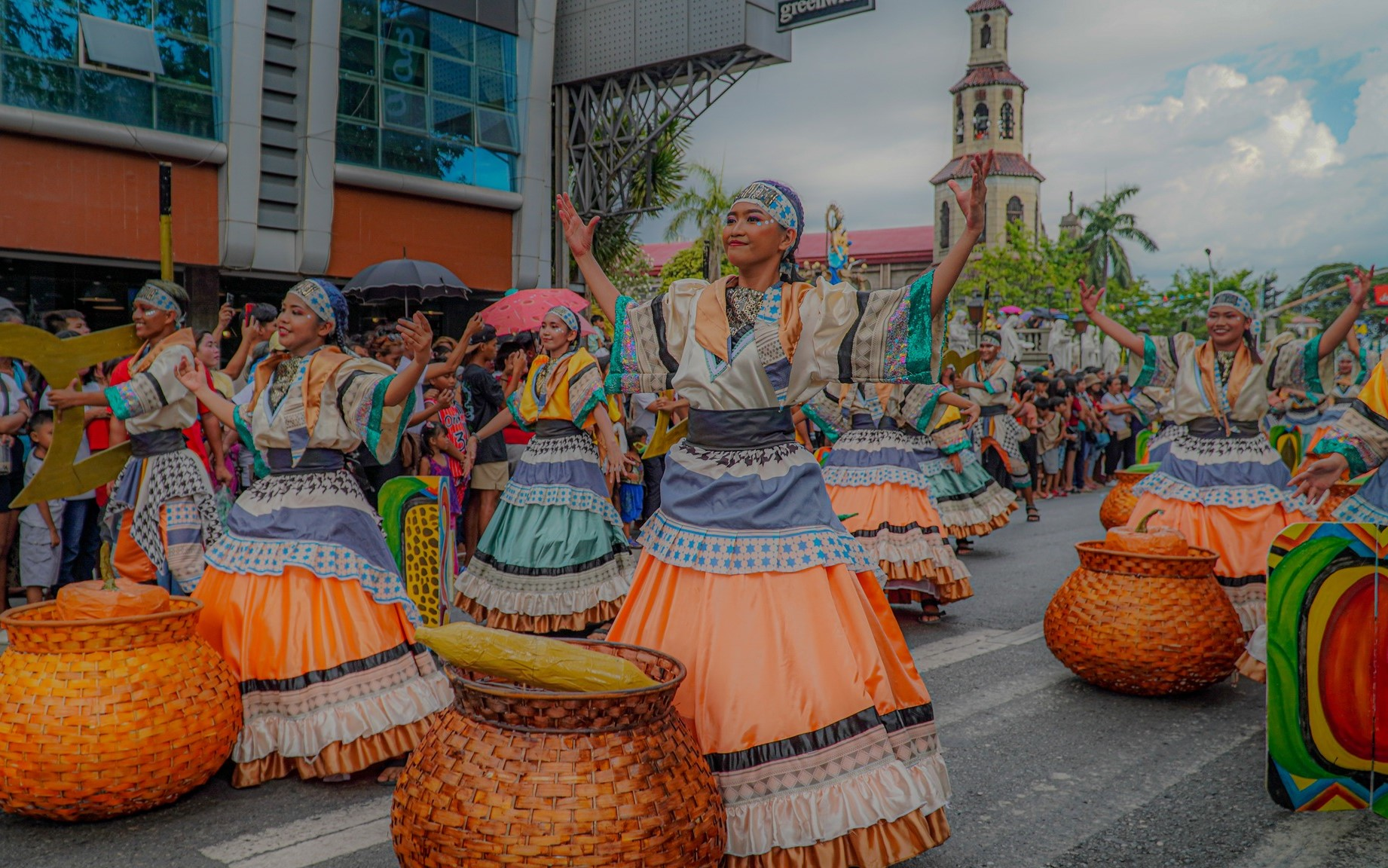
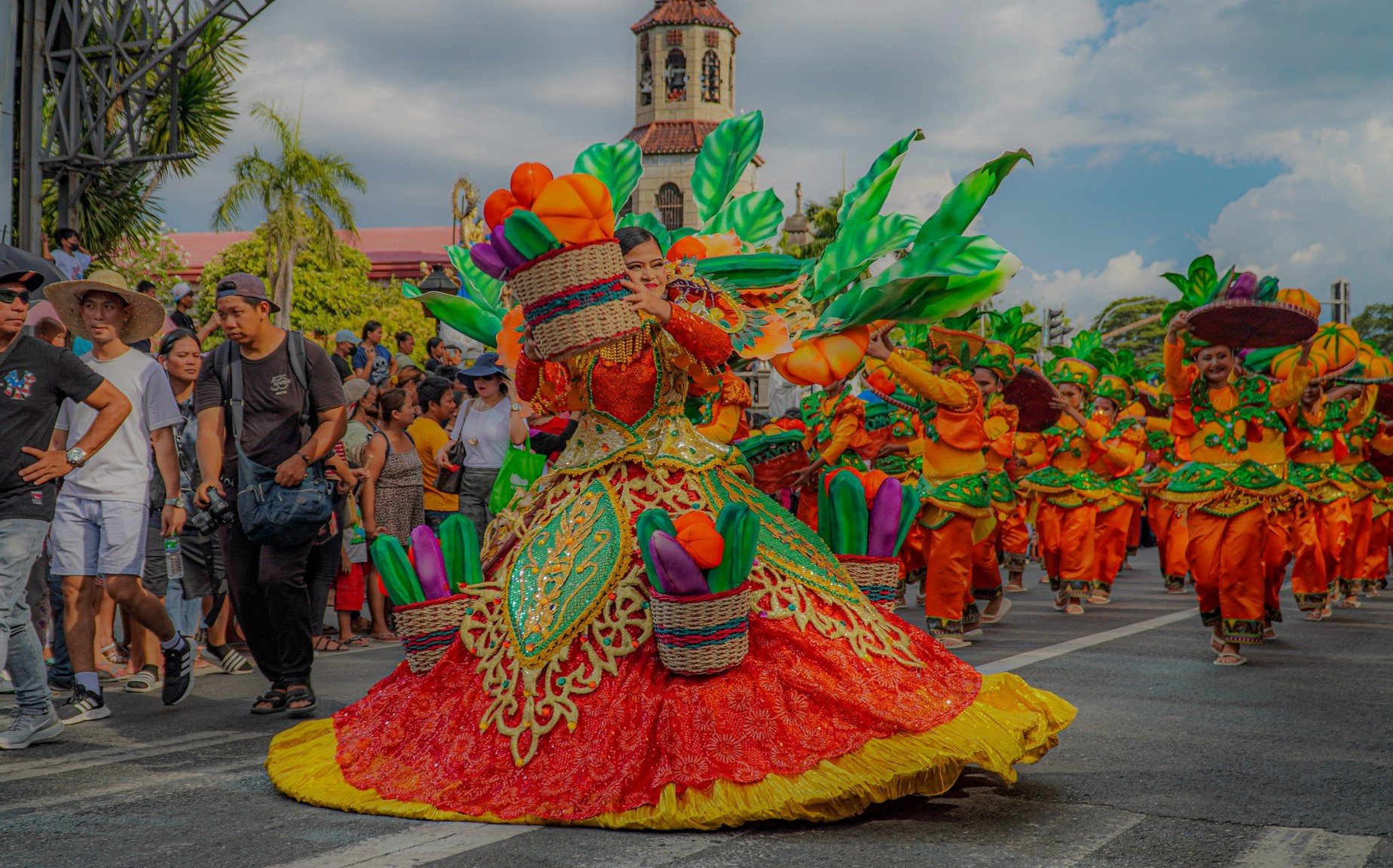
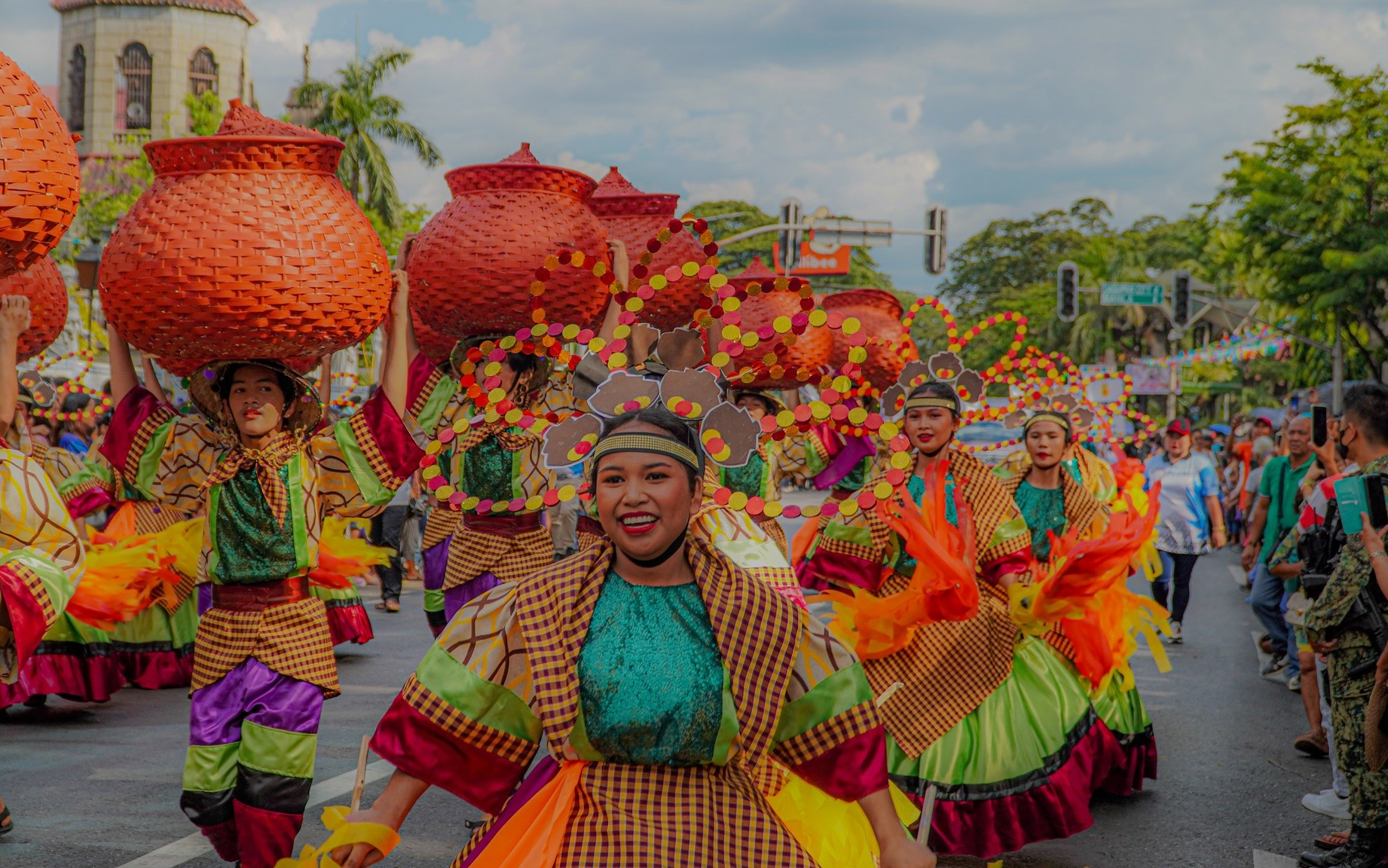
Dinengdeng Festival in Agoo, La Union

This festival replaces the old theme of tobacco, an important agricultural crop of Agoo. However, tobacco festivals are commonly celebrated throughout the country in different towns. The goal of the local government desired this festival to be comparable to other prominent festivities in the region, such as the Panagbenga.

== See also ==
- Sinabawang gulay
- Binagoongan
- Bulanglang
- Laswa
- Kinilnat

== Bibliography ==
- Cacatian, Shella B., and John Lester T. Tabian. "Floristic composition and diversity of indigenous wild food resources in northwestern Cagayan, Philippines." Biodiversitas Journal of Biological Diversity 24.4 (2023).
- Bajet Jr, Manuel, and Engr Norma Esguerra. "Prototyping of a Mechanized Bagoong Squeezer." The Vector: International Journal of Emerging Science, Technology and Management 17:.1 (2008).
