= Kinilnat =

Ilocano-Filipino salad dish

Kinilnát
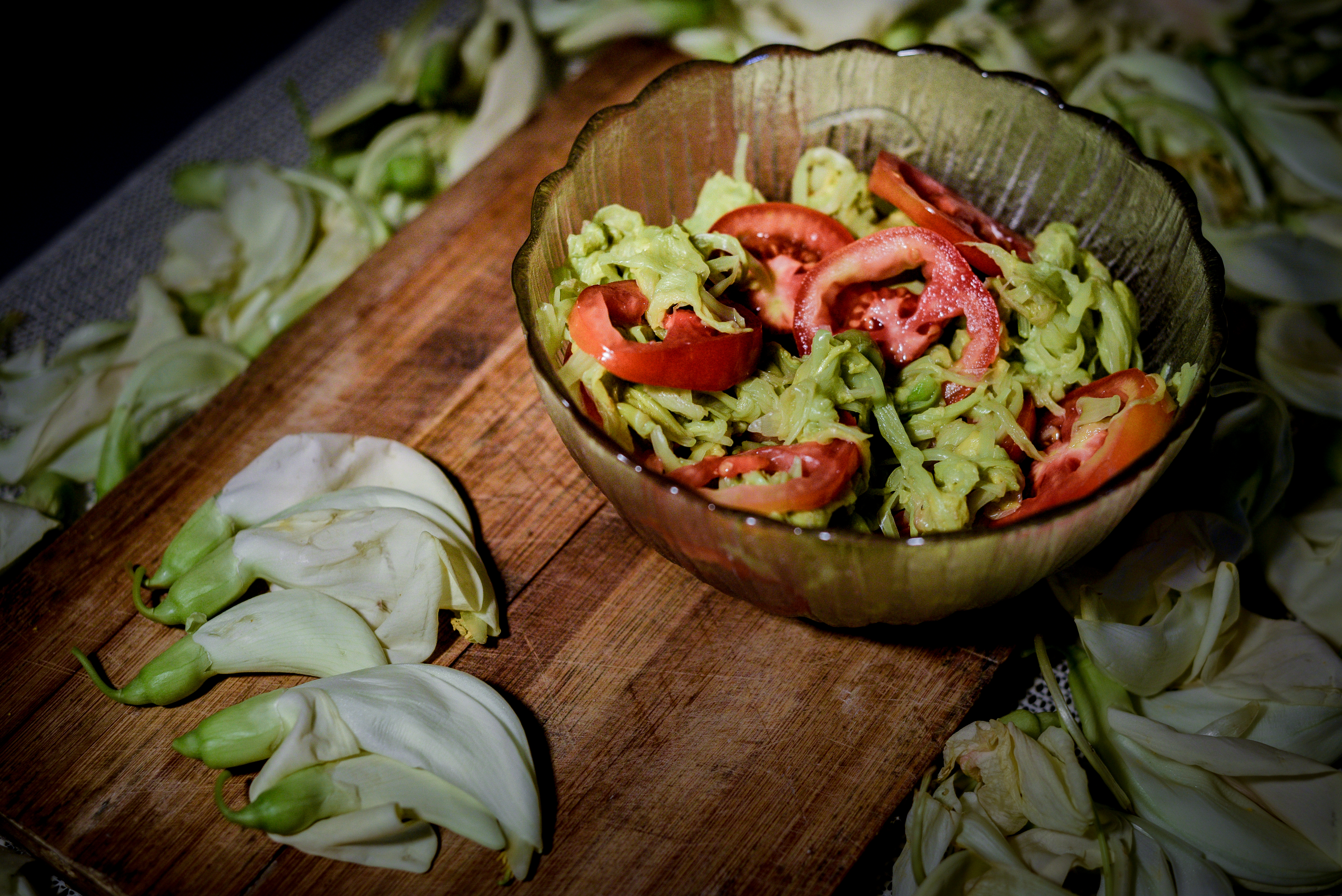
- A variation of kinilnát, known as kinilnát nga katudáy, made from katuday and dressed with KBL, consisting of kamatis (tomatoes), buggúong (fermented fish sauce), and lasona (shallots).
- Alternative names: Kilnát, Ensalada
- Type: Salad
- Course: Side dish, Main Course
- Place of origin: Philippines
- Region or state: Ilocos Region
- Associated cuisine: Filipino Cuisine
- Serving temperature: Cold, Room Temperature
- Main ingredients: Bagoong isda (fermented fish sauce), onions, tomatoes, and assorted vegetables such as leaves, fruits, blossoms, and legumes.

Kinilnat, also known as kilnat or ensalada, is a Filipino vegetable salad originating from northern Luzon, Philippines. It is characterized by a savory, tangy, and salty flavor profile derived primarily from its dressing, which is typically made with fermented fish sauce (buggúong or bagoong isda), commonly produced from anchovies. The dish consists of a variety of blanched vegetables, including leafy greens, blossoms, legumes, and shoots. Common ingredients include sweet potato leaves, eggplant, okra, hummingbird tree flowers (Sesbania grandiflora), moringa flowers, fern shoots, and winged beans. The dressing traditionally consists of fermented fish sauce mixed with tomatoes and shallots or onions. In Ilocano cuisine, this combination is locally known as KBL, an acronym for kamatis (tomatoes), buggúong, and lasoná (shallots).

Kinilnat has numerous variations, depending on the availability or season and combination of vegetables used. These may include kalunay, jute mallow, birch flower, squash shoots and young pods, cabbage, banana blossoms, sabidulong fruit and flower, long beans, bitter melon, hyacinth beans, and other vegetables. Variations of the dressing may include the addition of sugarcane vinegar (sukang Iloko) and calamansi juice mixed with fermented fish sauce.

== Etymology ==
Kinilnát is derived from the Ilocano root word kilnát or kelnát, which means “to parboil” or “to partially cook,” particularly in reference to vegetables. The term kinilnat literally translates to “parboiled” or “partially cooked,” describing the dish’s primary method of preparation.

== See also ==
- Binagoongan
- Dinengdeng
- Kilawin
- List of salads
