= Asparagus bean =

Legume cultivated for its edible pods

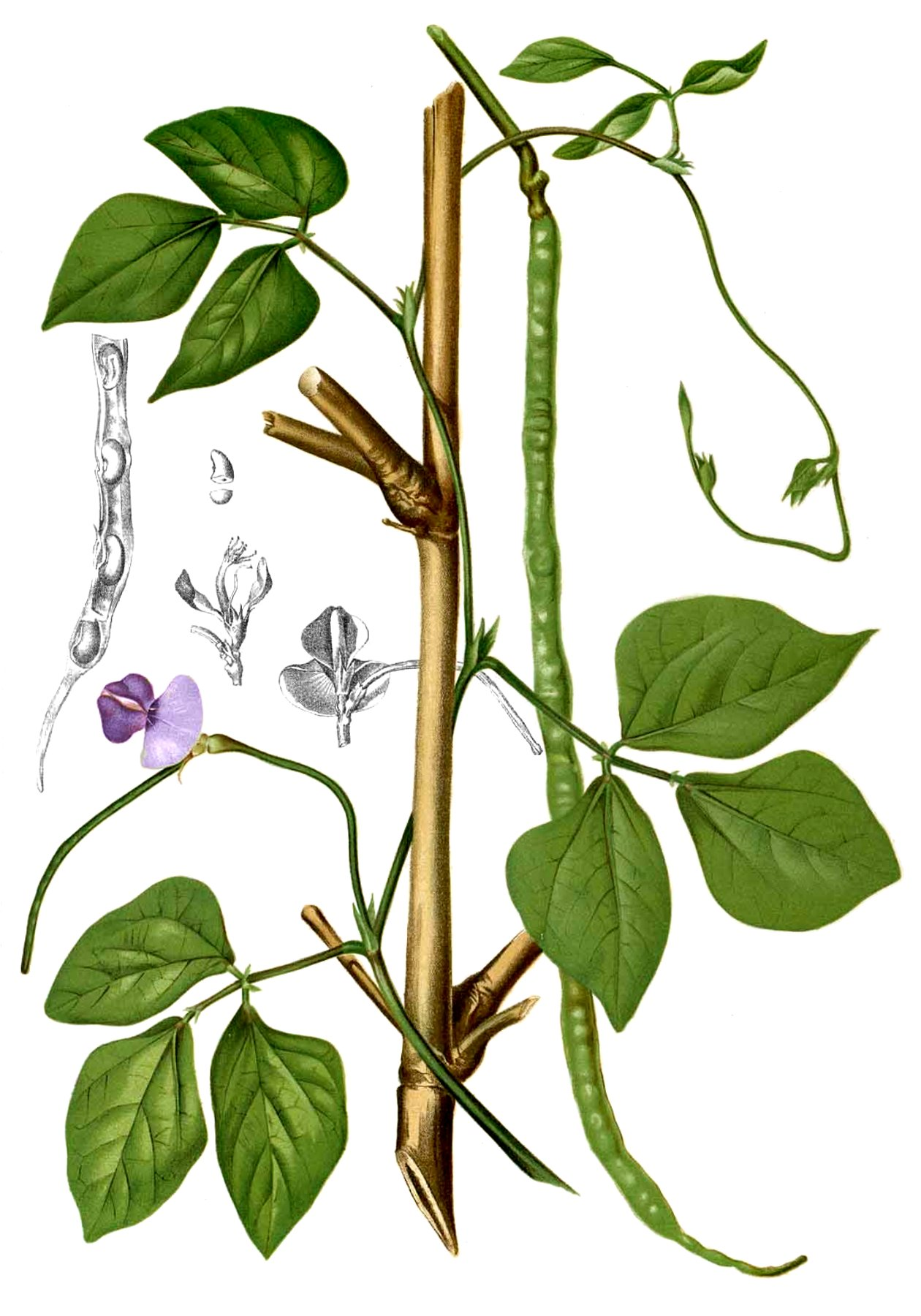
- Species: Vigna unguiculata (L.) Walp.
- Cultivar group: 'sesquipedalis'
- Cultivar: Asparagus bean

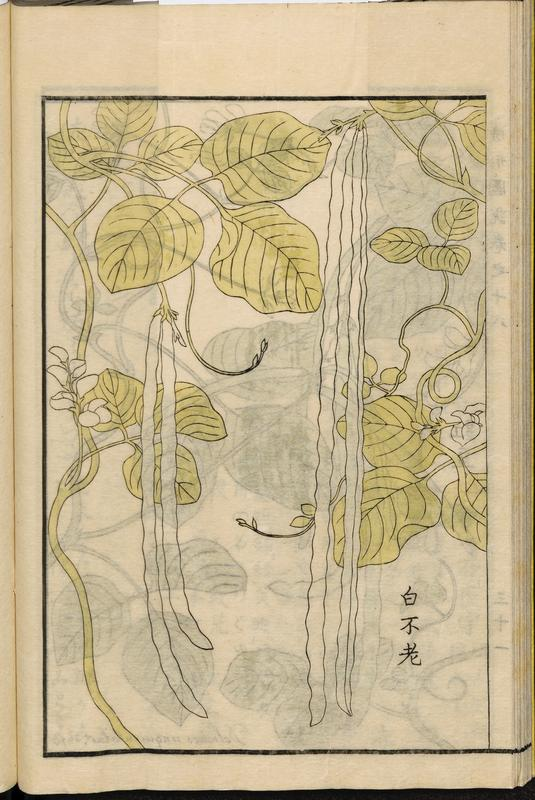
Yardlong bean, illustration from the Japanese agricultural encyclopedia Seikei Zusetsu (1804)

The asparagus bean (Vigna unguiculata subsp. sesquipedalis) is a legume cultivated for its edible green pods containing immature seeds, like the green bean. It is also known as yardlong bean, pea bean, long-podded cowpea, Chinese long bean, snake bean, bodi, bora, and kosbanti (kousenband). Despite the common name of "yardlong", the pods are actually only about half a yard long, so the subspecies name sesquipedalis (one-and-a-half-foot-long; 1.5 feet (0.50 yd)) is a more accurate approximation.

A variety of the cowpea, the asparagus bean is grown primarily for its strikingly long (35 to 75 centimetres (1.15 to 2.46 ft)) immature green pods and has uses very similar to those of the green bean. This plant is in a different genus from the common bean. The different colors of seeds usually distinguish the many varieties. It is a vigorous climbing annual vine. The plant is subtropical/tropical and most widely grown in the warmer parts of South Asia, Southeast Asia, and southern China.

== Cultivation ==
The pods, which can begin to form 2-3 weeks after sowing, hang in groups of two or more. They are used as vegetables when they are picked before they reach full maturity; however, overlooked mature pods can be used like dry beans. When harvesting, it is important not to pick the buds above the beans since the plant will set many more beans on the same stem in the future. The plants take longer to reach maturity than bush beans, but once they start producing, the pods are quick-growing, and daily checking and harvesting are often necessary. In temperate climates, the plants can produce beans until the first frost. The plant attracts many pollinators, specifically various types of wasps and ants.

The plant is easy to grow in areas with hot and humid summers where other green bean varieties may succumb to heat damage in summer, and as such, is worthy of more cultivation in these areas. This plant is particularly easy to grow in the Southeastern United States and southerly Midwestern United States, where it is not currently grown commonly.

== Uses ==
=== Culinary ===
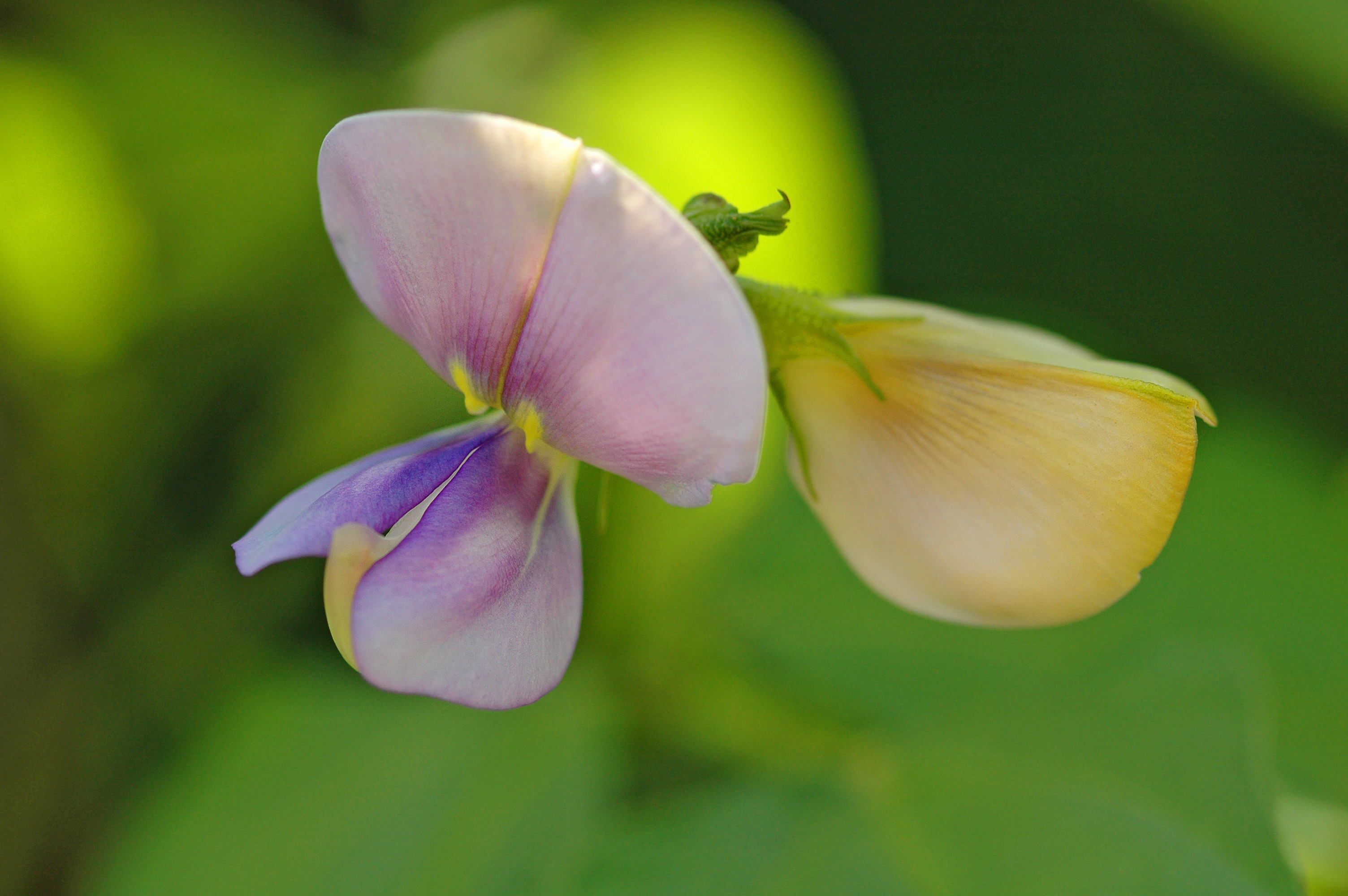
Flower of yardlong bean

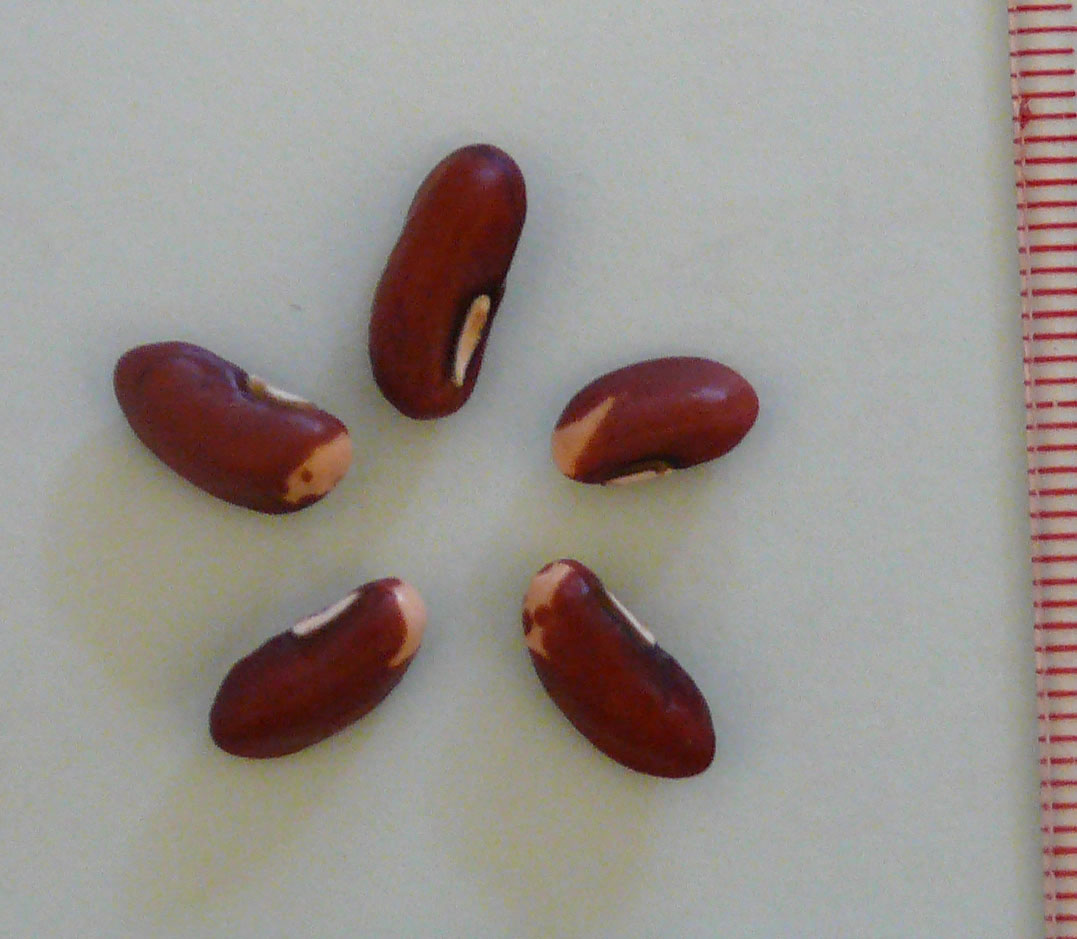
Seeds of yardlong beans

The crisp, tender pods are eaten both fresh and cooked. They are at their best when young and slender. They are sometimes cut into short sections for cooking uses. As a West Indian dish, they are often stir-fried with potatoes and shrimp. In Odisha, India, they are used to make a variety of dishes, especially a sour dish - ଝୁଡ଼ୁଙ୍ଗ ବେସର [judunga besara] cooking along with mustard sauce and lime. They are also used in stir-fries in Chinese cuisine, Thai cuisine and Kerala cuisine.

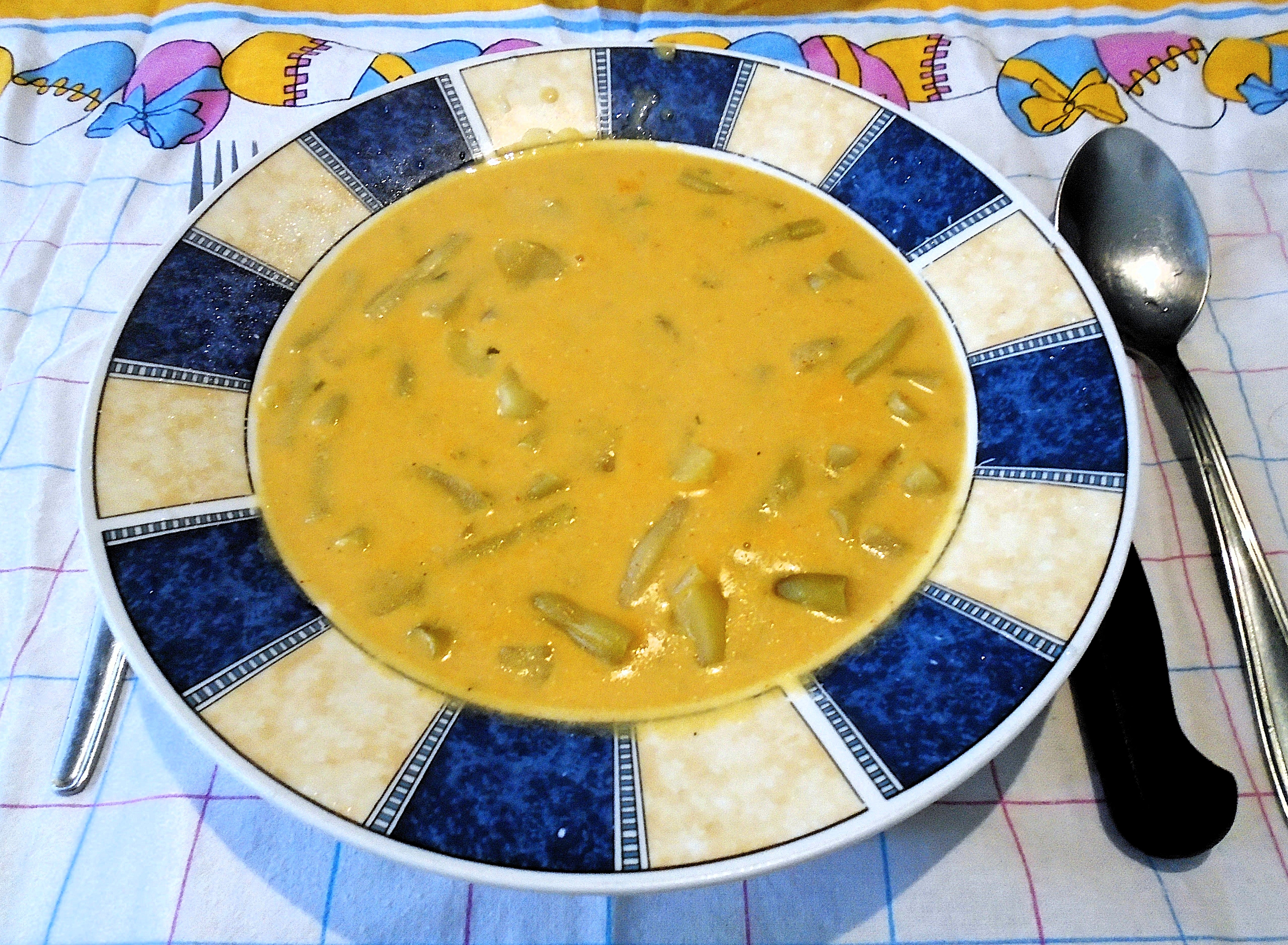
Asparagus bean stew from Croatia

In the Philippines, they are widely eaten stir-fried with soy sauce, garlic, and hot pepper and in an all-vegetable dish called utan, or are stewed in bagoong-based dishes such as pinakbet and dinengdeng. Other Filipino dishes that have yardlong beans as ingredients are sinigang and kare-kare. Yardlong beans are also separated from the pod and are cooked with the buds of the alukon tree (Broussonetia luzonica, synonym Alleaenthus luzonicus) and other vegetables in a dish called agaya in northeastern Luzon.

In Suriname cuisine, they are served with roti. Similarly, in Trinidad and Tobago and Guyana, it is an Indo-Trinidadian/Indo-Guyanese dish that is fried or curried and served with roti or rice.

They are called මෑ කරල් (mae karal) in Sri Lankan cuisine, and are used for stir-fries and as a curry. The Department of Agriculture (Sri Lanka) has released eight varieties of the bean for cultivation.

== Nutrition ==
They are a good source of carbohydrates, protein, vitamin A, thiamin, riboflavin, iron, phosphorus, and potassium, and vitamin C, folate, magnesium, and manganese.

Yardlong bean, raw
Nutritional value per 100 g (3.5 oz)
- Energy: 197 kJ (47 kcal)
- Carbohydrates: 8.35 g
- Fat: 0.4 g
- Protein: 2.8 g
Vitamins and minerals
| Vitamins | Quantity %DV^{†} |
| Vitamin A equiv. | 5% 43 μg |
| Thiamine (B1) | 9% 0.107 mg |
| Riboflavin (B2) | 8% 0.11 mg |
| Niacin (B3) | 3% 0.41 mg |
| Pantothenic acid (B5) | 11% 0.55 mg |
| Vitamin B6 | 1% 0.024 mg |
| Folate (B9) | 16% 62 μg |
| Vitamin C | 21% 18.8 mg |
| Minerals | Quantity %DV^{†} |
| Calcium | 4% 50 mg |
| Iron | 3% 0.47 mg |
| Magnesium | 10% 44 mg |
| Manganese | 9% 0.205 mg |
| Phosphorus | 5% 59 mg |
| Potassium | 8% 240 mg |
| Sodium | 0% 4 mg |
| Zinc | 3% 0.37 mg |
- Link to USDA Database entry
- ^{†}Percentages estimated using US recommendations for adults, except for potassium, which is estimated based on expert recommendation from the National Academies.

A serving of 100 grams of yardlong beans contains 47 calories, 0 g of total fat, 4 mg sodium (0% daily value), 8 g of total carbohydrates (2% daily value), and 3 g of protein (5% daily value).
