= Sinabawang gulay =

Filipino vegetable soup

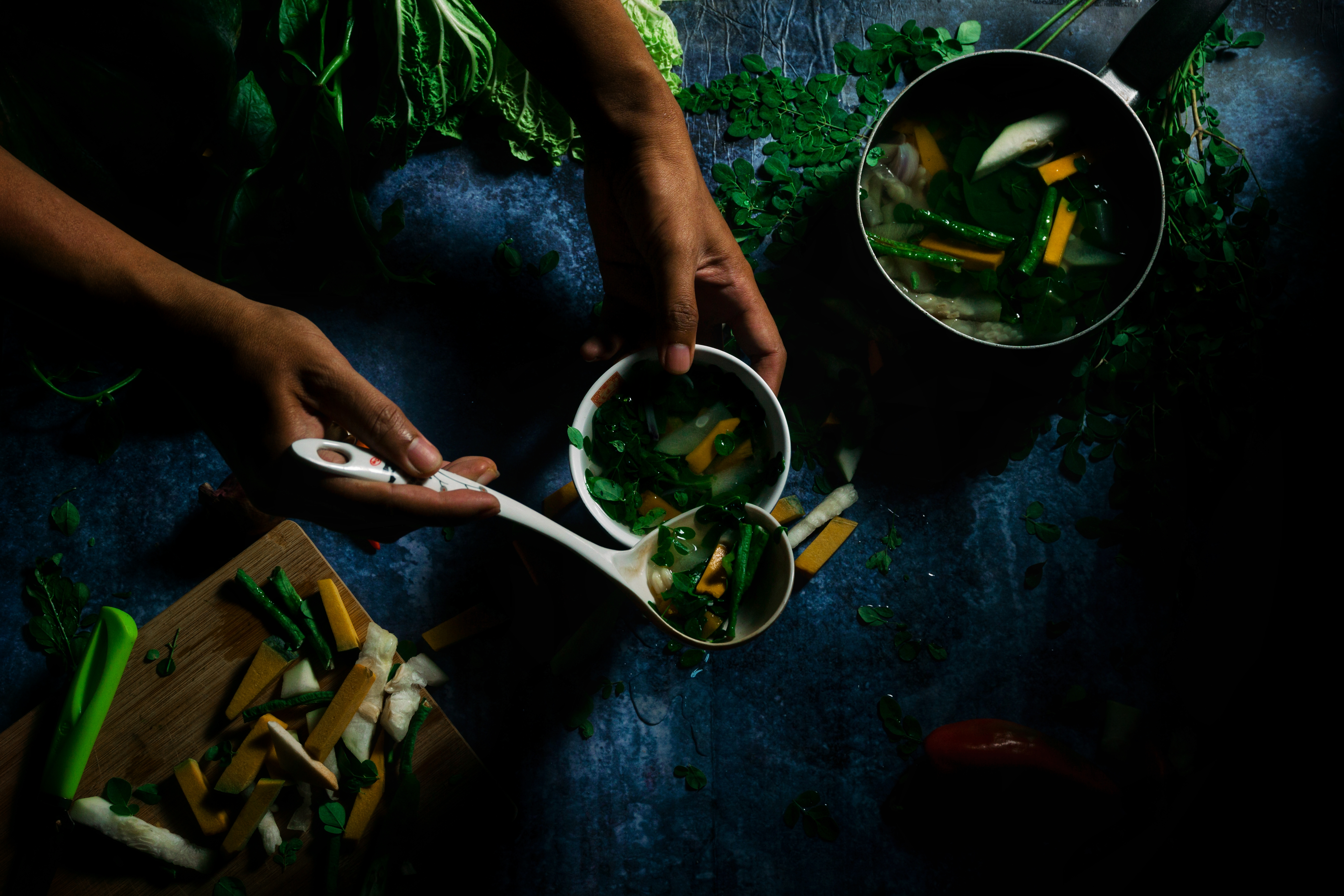
- Alternative names: Filipino vegetable soup, utan bisaya, sabaw na utan, law-oy, laswa, bulanglang na gulay
- Type: Soup
- Place of origin: Philippines
- Serving temperature: Hot
- Main ingredients: Various leafy vegetables

Sinabawang gulay, usually anglicized as Filipino vegetable soup, is a Filipino vegetable soup made with leafy vegetables (usually moringa leaves) and various other vegetables in a broth seasoned with seafood stock or patis (fish sauce). The ingredients of the dish can vary widely. It is eaten on its own or over white rice.

== Names ==
"Sinabawang gulay" simply means "vegetable soup". The dish is found throughout the Philippines and is known under a wide variety of names. It is known as bulanglang na gulay in Batangas; sabaw na utan, law-oy, utan bisaya, or utan kamunggay in the Visayas Islands and Mindanao; and laswa in Western Visayas. Dinengdeng of Northern Luzon is also a type of sinabawang gulay, although it differs in that it does not use garlic.

== Description ==
The primary ingredient of the dish are leafy vegetables like moringa leaves, mustard greens, pepper leaves, and pechay, among others. It is cooked with a variety of vegetables with onion, tomato, garlic, and ginger in a broth seasoned with seafood stock or patis. Lemongrass and siling haba can also be added to the broth. The vegetables normally used in sinabawang gulay include okra, calabaza, eggplant, yardlong beans, bitter melon, calabash, chayote, green papaya, and taro tubers, among many others. Regional variations of the dish may also contain dried fish, shrimp, mussels or clams.

== Similar dishes ==
Sinabawang gulay is similar to tinola and related dishes, except it does not use meat. It is also similar to vegetable-based ginataan dishes like ginataang kalabasa and ginataang ampalaya, except that it does not use coconut milk.

== See also ==
- List of soups
