= Fermented fish =

Fish cured by fermentation to reduce spoilage

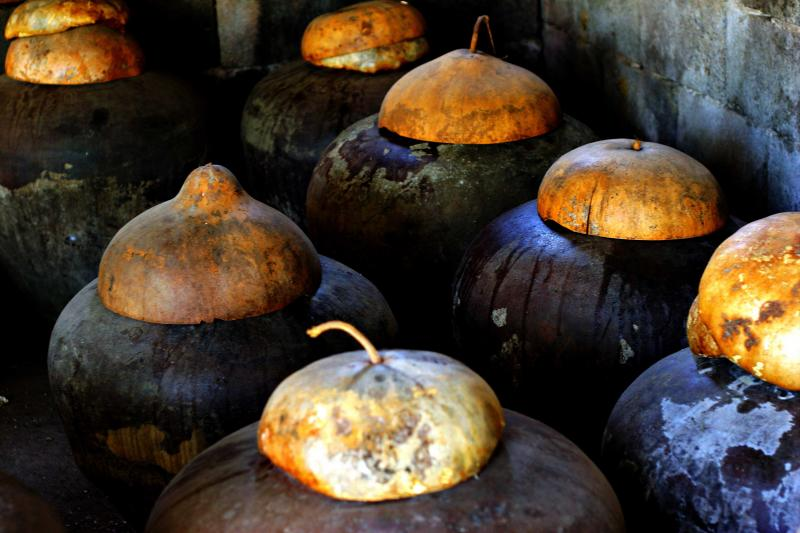
Traditional burnay jars sealed with bottle gourds containing fermenting fish (bagoong) in the Philippines

Fermented fish is a traditional form of preserved fish. Before refrigeration, canning, and other modern preservation techniques became available, fermenting was an important preservation method. Fish rapidly spoils, or goes rotten, unless some method is applied to stop the bacteria that produce the spoilage. Fermentation is a method which inhibits the ability of microbes to spoil fish. It does this by making the fish muscle more acidic; bacteria usually cease multiplying when the pH drops below 4.5.

A modern approach, biopreservation, adds lactic acid bacteria to the fish to be fermented. This produces active antimicrobials such as lactic and acetic acid, hydrogen peroxide, and bacteriocins. It can also produce the antimicrobial nisin, a particularly effective preservative.

Fermented fish preparations can be notable for their putrid smell. These days there are many other techniques of preserving fish, but fish is still fermented because some people enjoy the taste.

An archaeological find from 2016 provides evidence for fish fermentation dating back to 9,200 years ago.

== Risks ==
Alaska has witnessed a steady increase in cases of botulism since 1985. It has more cases of foodborne botulism than any other state in the United States of America. This is caused by the traditional Inuit/Yupik practice of allowing animal products such as whole fish, fish heads, walrus, sea lion, and whale flippers, beaver tails, seal oil, birds, etc., to ferment for an extended period of time before being consumed. The risk is exacerbated when a plastic container is used for this purpose instead of the old-fashioned, traditional method, a grass-lined hole, as the botulinum bacteria thrive in the anaerobic conditions created by the air-tight enclosure in plastic.

== Preparations ==
Name	Image	Country	Notes
Bagoong		Philippines	Partially or completely fermented fish or shrimps. Fish bagoong is prepared by mixing salt with fish, and placing it inside large earthen fermentation jars. There it is left to ferment for 30–90 days with occasional stirring to make sure the salt is spread evenly. A food colouring called angkak is added to give the bagoong its characteristic red or pink colour. Angkak is made from rice inoculated with a species of red mold (Monascus purpureus). Some manufacturers grind the fermented product finely and sell the resulting mixture as fish paste. A byproduct of the fermentation process is a fish sauce called patis.
Bekasang		Indonesia	Fermented offal, or only stomach of tuna.
Bottarga, poutargue, boutargue, botarga		Mediterranean, Mauritania	Bottarga is salted cured fish roe, typically of grey mullet frequently found near coastlines throughout the world.
Burong isda		Philippines	A Filipino dish consisting of cooked rice and filleted fish fermented with salt and angkak (red yeast rice) for around a week.
Chêpa Shũṭki		Bengal, Bangladesh	Literally "pressurized shũṭki" or "pressurized dried fish". Puti Fish are used to prepare Chepa Shutki. They are sun-dried for 12 to 14 days, then kept in a jute sack for one month, after which it is washed and placed in a pressurized earthenware pot for 3 to 4 months.
Colombo cure		Sri Lanka, India, Bangladesh	Fish are gutted, washed and salted together with dried fruit pulp or tamarind. The fish are kept covered in brine with the help of weighted mats and are fermented for 2 to 4 months.
Dayok		Philippines	A Philippine condiment from the Visayas and Mindanao islands of the Philippines consisting of fish entrails (usually from yellowfin tuna), excluding the heart and bile sac, fermented in salt, various herbs, and sometimes pangasi (an indigenous rice wine). It has a sharp umami flavor and is used similarly to patis (Filipino fish sauce).
Fesikh, fassikh, fassiekh, terkeen		Egypt, Sudan	Fermented, salted and dried gray mullet, of the mugil family, a saltwater fish that lives in both the Mediterranean and the Red Seas. The traditional process of preparing it is to dry the fish in the sun before preserving it in salt. The process of preparing fesikh is quite elaborate, passing from father to son in certain families. The occupation has a special name in Egypt, fasakhani. Fesikh is eaten during the Sham el-Nessim festival, which is a spring celebration from ancient times in Egypt. In Sudan species used are Alestes spp. and Hydrocynus spp. Processing time is 10 to 20 days. The products is packed in wooden boxes and also in used vegetable oil tins. In the case of terkeen the fermented fish is warmed up and stirred at the end of the processing period, resulting in a paste that includes small fish bones and has a taste resembling both liver pâté and anchovy paste. Both products are important ingredients (condiments) in Sudanese as well as in Egyptian cooking.
Fish sauce		Asia	Clear light or dark brown liquid produced from salted fermented anchovies (Stolephorus sp.) or other fish or fishery products such as squid, shrimp and shellfish. The fermentation period is usually half a year or more, up to one and a half year (the longer the better). Local names are: Cambodia – teok trei; China – yu lu, xing tang, yee su; Indonesia – kecap ikan; Japan – ishiri, ishiru, shotssuru, ikanago; Korea – aekjeot; Lao – nam pla; Malaysia – budu; Myanmar – nganpya yay; Philippines – patis; Thailand – nam pla; Vietnam nuoc mam. A similar product produced in Italy is colatura di Alici. Attempts to make similar products in Africa (Côte d'Ivoire, Madagascar, Senegal) failed because of lack of involvement of the private sector, but the potential still exists. Also in South America there is potential to make it, for instance in Peru from longnose anchovy Anchoa nasus.
Funazushi		Japan	Fresh funa (a freshwater fish) are scaled and gutted through their gills keeping the body (and always the roe) of the fish intact. The fish are then packed with salt and aged for a year before being repacked annually in rice for up to four years. The resulting fermented dish may be served sliced thin or used as an ingredient in other dishes. The more generic term Narezushi is any fermented fish.
Garum		Ancient Greek and Rome	Fermented fish sauce and essential flavour
Guedj		Senegal	Salt-cured fish popular as flavoring in local dishes in Senegal and West Africa. Gutted whole or split fish are packed between layers of coarse sea salt and fermented for one to three days. They are then sun-dried.
Hákarl		Iceland	Consists of a Greenland- or basking shark cured and hung to dry for four to five months. Hákarl is often referred to as an acquired taste and smells richly of ammonia with a strong fish and cheese taste. Traditionally prepared by gutting and beheading the shark and burying it in a shallow hole in gravelly sand. Stones are placed on top to press fluids from the shark. The shark ferments this way for 6–12 weeks, and is then cut into strips and hung to dry for several months. During the drying period a brown crust develops, which is removed prior to cutting the shark into small pieces and serving. The modern method is just to press the shark in a large drained plastic container. Chef Anthony Bourdain described hákarl as "the single worst, most disgusting and terrible tasting thing" he has ever eaten. Chef Gordon Ramsay challenged journalist James May to sample hákarl on The F Word. Ramsay vomited after the experience.
Hentak		Manipur, India	Made from powdered, sun-dried Indian flying barb and the petioles of aroid plants
Hongeohoe		Korea	Made from fermented skate. Has a strong characteristic ammonia-like odour. Usually served uncooked and without further preparation, along with other Korean side dishes such as kimchi.
Jeotgal		Korea	Salted fermented dishes made with seafood such as fish, shellfish, and other marine animals. Depending on the ingredients, jeotgal can range from flabby, solid pieces to clear, broth-like liquid. Solid jeotgal are usually eaten as banchan (side dish). Liquid jeotgal, called aekjeot, is popularly used in kimchi seasoning, as well as in various soups and stews.
Kusaya		Japan	Salted-dried and fermented fish, famous for its malodorousness similar to the pungent fermented Swedish herring surströmming. Though the smell of kusaya is strong, the taste is quite mellow. Often eaten with Japanese sake or shōchū. Kusaya originated in the Izu Islands, probably on Niijima, where, during the Edo period people used to earn a living through salt making. Villagers paid taxes to the government with the salt they made, and as taxes were high, salt for fish-curing was used frugally. The same salt was used many times for this purpose, resulting in a pungent dried fish, which was later called kusaya. The resulting, tea-colored, sticky, stinky brine was passed on from generation to generation as a family heirloom. Though kusaya is made on several of the Izu Islands today, it is said that kusaya from Niijima has the strongest odor.
Lakerda		Greece	Steaks of bonito are boned, soaked in brine, then salted and weighted for about a week. They are then ready to eat, or may be stored in olive oil. Sometimes large mackerel or small tuna are used instead of bonito.
Lanhouin		Ghana, Togo, Benin	Lanhouin is salted fermented dried fish produced in the coastal regions of the Gulf of Benin using croaker (Cassava fish, Pseudotholithus sp.) or West African Spanish mackerel (Scomberomorus tritor). Lanhouin is widely used as a condiment.
Lumlom		Philippines	Fish (traditionally milkfish or tilapia) buried in mud for a day or two until it begins to slightly ferment. It is cleaned and cooked as paksiw sa tuba, with nipa vinegar and spices, and sometimes coconut cream. It is a pre-colonial regional dish of Bulacan.
Mahyaveh		Iran	Mahyaveh is produced in the southern part of Iran, especially in Larestan and Hormozgan, from sardines (Sardinella sp.) or anchovies (Stolephorus sp.), salt, spices and water. The fish – fresh or dried – are headed, washed, mixed with salt and warm water and packed into earthenware or glass jars. After a month the mixture is mashed into a slurry and filtered. The resulting brown liquid is then mixed with mustard (Brassica juncea) and other spices, such as cumin (Cuminum cyminum), coriander (Coriandrum sativum), fennel seeds (Foeniculum vulgare), black pepper (Piper nigrum) and thyme (Thymus capitatus). After another 10 to 15 days the desirable taste and aroma are produced and the sauce is ready.
Matjes (maatjes) herring		Netherlands, Germany	Lightly salted and fermented fat young herring usually eaten with chopped onion. The name derives from the Dutch "maagd" (virgin) as the young herring have no developed gonads. See Gibbing.
Momone (momoni)		Ghana	Momone is produced in Ghana from various fish species and also from squid and octopus. The fish is gutted, washed, rubbed with salt and packed in layers in barrels, alternating with layers of salt. After fermentation for 7 days the fish are dried in the sun. Pieces of momone, together with ground red pepper, tomato, onion and palm oil are boiled to a sauce to accompany pounded starchy staple foods.
Ngachin		Myanmar (Burma)	Pressed and fermented fish eaten in Burmese cuisine
Ngapi		Myanmar (Burma)	a fermented paste made of either fish or shrimp, commonly used as a seasoning or sauce in Burmese cuisine
Ngari		Manipur, India	Ngari is a traditional fermented food of Manipur. It is prepared by fermenting smaller freshwater fishes with mustard oil and salt. The dried fish are then tightly packed them in a big clay urn which is made airtight. The urn is buried for 30–40 days. Ngari is roasted lightly prior to consumption, and then added in many Manipuri dishes, such as eromba.
Pekasam		Malaysia	Fermented half/fully fried mild coarse rices made by pickling several varieties of almost all fresh water fish, mainly Anabas testudineus, Tinfoil barb, Snakehead, Catfish, Leptobarbus hoevenii sometimes in Borneo, they ferment Macrobrachium rosenbergii, Freshwater prawn farming. Slightly different recipe and process of making Pla ra, the fish is also cleaned, cut into pieces if the size is too big and preserved with salt for several days and then mix with half fried Rice bran plus palm sugar or brown sugar. The sugar is claimed as starter to the rice bran to become brewed as result the pekasam have nicer sweet sour smells and salty taste. Sometimes tamarind juice also added to make the more sour effect. This is then left(traditionally) in a clay crock covered with a cheesecloth lid, to ferment for at least a week and up to a year.
Prahok		Cambodia	Prahok is a crushed, salted and fermented fish paste (usually of mud fish) that is used in Cambodian cuisine as a seasoning or a condiment. It originated as a way of preserving fish during the longer months when fresh fish was not available in abundant supply. Because of its saltiness and strong flavor, it was used as an addition to many meals in Cambodian cuisine, such as soups. Prahok has a strong and distinct smell, earning the nickname Cambodian Cheese. Prahok is usually eaten with rice in the countryside or poorer regions.
Pla ra		Thailand	Fermented fish sauce made by pickling several varieties of fish, mainly snakehead murrel. The fish is cleaned, cut into pieces and mixed with salt and rice bran. This is then left in a big jar covered with a wooden lid, to ferment for three months to a year. Recently a dried powdered version of pla ra has been successfully marketed.
Rakfisk		Norway	Made from trout or sometimes char, salted and fermented for two to three months, or even up to a year, then eaten without cooking. The first record of the term rakfisk dates back to 1348, but the history of the food is probably even older. As a dish, rakfisk is related to the Swedish surströmming and possibly shares a common origin. Traditionally eaten around Christmas.
Sikhae		Korea	Salted fermented food prepared with fish—typically righteye flounders, Alaska pollock, chub mackerel, sailfin sandfish, and Japanese anchovy— and grains—typically rice or foxtail millet—. Sikhae is made in the East coast regions of Korea, namely Gwanbuk, Gwandong, and Yeongnam regions.
Shiokara		Japan	Fermented offal.
Surströmming		Sweden	Fermented Baltic herring, notorious for its pungent odour.
Tepa		Yup'ik	Tepas, also called stinkheads, are fermented whitefish heads. A customary way of preparing them is to place fish heads and guts in a wooden barrel, cover it with burlap, and bury it in the ground for about a week. For a short while in modern times, plastic bags and buckets replaced the barrel. However this increased the risk of botulism, and the Yupik Eskimos have reverted to fermenting fishheads directly in the ground.
Tinapayan		Philippines	Fish (usually snakehead or catfish) is dried beforehand for a few days before being covered with tapay (cooked rice fermented overnight in banana leaves), with ginger, chilis, and other spices. It is allowed to ferment further for another week. The results are shredded and deep-fried in oil before serving (usually on white rice). It originates from the cuisine of the Maguindanao people.
Tungtap		Meghalaya, India	Sun-dried, salted, fermented Indian flying barb fish
Trassi (terasi, terassi) (Indonesia) Belacan (Malaysia)		Indonesia, Malaysia	Dark blocks made from dried fermented salted paste from tiny shrimp (trassi udang) or small fish (trassi ikan).
Worcestershire sauce		United Kingdom	Fish-based fermented condiment invented by the pharmacists John Wheeley Lea and William Henry Perrins in Worcester, Worcestershire, England, during the first half of the 19th century, and widely sold in UK and the Americas.
Chou Gui Yu (Stinky Mandarin Fish)	Fermented mandarin fish from Anhui Province, China	Anhui, China	Mandarin fish (Siniperca chuatsi) is layered with salt and fermented in a wooden barrel for 7 - 9 days at low room temperature. It is commonly fried or braised. Several folk stories are associated with the dish; a common theme includes that fermentation process was introduced (intentionally or accidentally) by merchants attempting to import Mandarin fish caught along the Yantze river into Anhui. At present, it is considered a representative dish of Anhui cuisine.
Song Hua Jiang Chou Yu (Songhua River Stinky Fish)		Heilongjiang, China	The Songhua River freezes up during the winter, preserving freshwater fish within the ice. The fish then ferments in the ice from its own enzymes throughout the winter months. When the river melts, the frozen fish are dug out of the ice and further processed by salting and drying. They are often treated as a sign of the end of winter, and some practices intentionally leave salted fish to sit and ferment in heavy snow as a spring festival tradition.

== See also ==
- Food fermentation
- Preserved fish
