= Philippine condiments =

Condiments used in Filipino cuisine

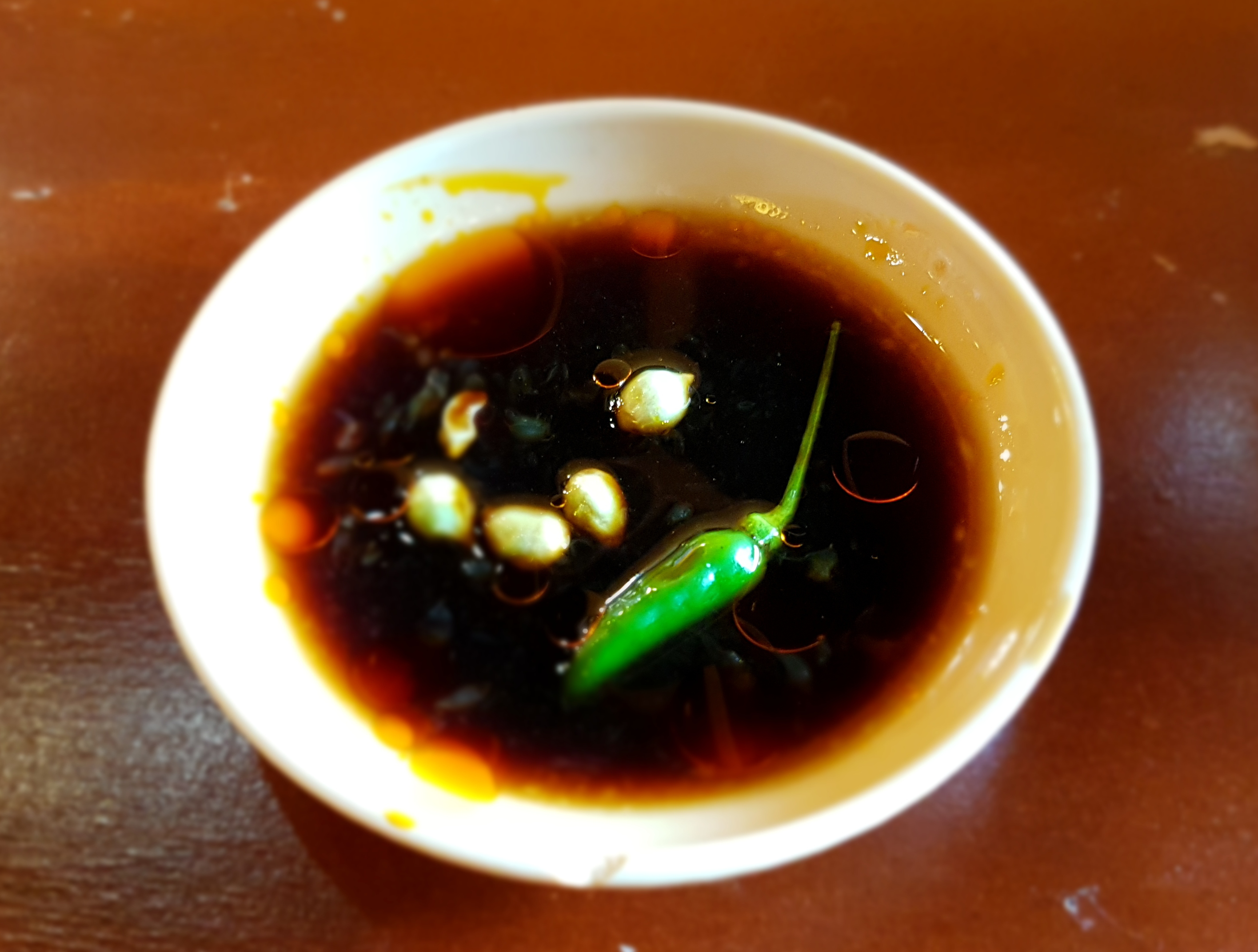
Toyomansi, a typical Filipino dipping sauce (sawsawan) composed of soy sauce and calamansi spiced with labuyo chilis

The generic term for condiments in the Filipino cuisine is sawsawan (Philippine Spanish: sarsa). Unlike sauces in other Southeast Asian regions, most sawsawan are not prepared beforehand, but are assembled on the table according to the preferences of the diner.

== Description ==
In the Philippines, the common condiments aside from salt and pepper are vinegar, soy sauce, calamansi, and patis.

The most common type of sawsawan is the toyomansi (or toyo't kalamansi), which is a mixture of soy sauce, calamansi, and native Siling labuyo. It can also be seasoned with vinegar and patis (fish sauce). This sauce is typically served with roasted meat dishes.

A similar dipping sauce used for grilled meats like inihaw is toyo, suka, at sili (literally "soy sauce, vinegar, and chili"). It is made of soy sauce, vinegar, and siling labuyo with some opting to add diced onions and/or garlic and a seasoning of sugar and/or black pepper. For serving with grilled fish, it is typically garnished with diced tomatoes, patis (fish sauce), or more rarely, bagoong (fermented shrimp or fish).

The simplest dipping sauce, for example, is vinegar mixed with another ingredient like siling labuyo (sukang may sili), garlic (suka't bawang), soy sauce (sukang may toyo), and so on. This can be elaborated further by adding a range of spices and even fruits, resulting in dipping sauces like sinamak (spiced vinegar). Suka Pinakurat is a popular brand of spiced vinegar in the Philippines.

All of these do not have set recipes, however, and can use ingredients and proportions interchangeably according to what is available and to the preference of the diner.

Other notable ingredients added to these kinds of sawsawan include shallots, whole black peppercorns, sugar, siling haba, wansoy (cilantro), ginger, and so on. Sawsawan are also unique in that they can function as marinades.

Some sauces need to be prepared beforehand like the traditional Filipino sweet and sour sauce agre dulce (or agri dulci) which is made from cornstarch, salt, sugar, and tomato or banana ketchup. When made with hot peppers like siling labuyo, it becomes a sweet chili sauce. It is the traditional dipping sauces of fried dishes like lumpia or okoy. A similar sauce used for fried street food appetizers is known simply as "manong's sauce". It is made with flour or cornstarch, sugar, soy sauce, garlic, chilis, ground pepper, and muscovado or brown sugar.

Another spicy condiment used for street food is the "chili garlic sauce" made from minced chilis, especially siling labuyo, and fried garlic. Some add powdered dried shrimp or finely minced meat to the sauce. It is usually consumed with siomai as a sauce made with soy sauce and typically spritzed with calamansi.

Among the Maranao people, another notable condiment is the palapa, a very spicy condiment made from sakurab (native scallions), ginger, turmeric, and chilis. It is an ubiquitous accompaniment to Maranao meals.

For seafood dishes, another common condiment is taba ng talangka (also called aligue, "roe", colloquially). This is a savory paste derived from crab roe or fat preserved in garlic and oil, with other ingredients like calamansi, vinegar, and others. It is typically sauteed and eaten as is with rice, with shellfish or over fried garlic rice.

== List of Philippine condiments ==
The following is a list of condiments used in Filipino cuisine.

| Name | Image | Description |
|---|---|---|
| Agre dulce | | A sweet and sour sauce made from cornstarch, salt, sugar, and tomato or banana ketchup. |
| Asado sauce | | A sauce made from the leftover boiling liquid of asado. Commercial brands use a mixture of pineapple juice, soy sauce, and sugar with cornstarch as a thickener. Served as a sauce for siopao. |
| Balao-balao | | |
| Banana ketchup | | A sweet, red condiment made primarily of bananas. Has a sweet, tangy taste without the sourness of tomato ketchup. |
| Banana ketchup and mayonnaise sauce | | A combination of mayonnaise and banana ketchup. Similar to fry sauce but uses banana ketchup instead of tomato ketchup. |
| Chicken oil | | Byproduct of the inasal roasting process and served as an accompanying condiment, by itself or poured over steamed white rice. |
| Chili garlic sauce | | Similar to Chinese chili oil, a condiment of minced siling labuyo and garlic simmered in water and then fried in oil. Can be made with powdered dried shrimp or finely minced meat and can also be made omitting the simmering in water. It is commonly served as an accompaniment for siomai; typically served with soy sauce spritzed with calamansi. |
| Ginisa a kamatis ken lasona iti bugguong | | An Ilocano condiment of pounded heirloom tomatoes, fish paste, and finely chopped red onions. Commonly paired with grilled foods (tinuno), ensaladas, chicharon, bagnet, or eaten by itself as a viand. |
| Kuyog | | A Bicolano condiment of fermented rabbitfish commonly flavored with galangal |
| Manong's sauce/Fishball sauce | | Literally 'Mister's sauce'. A dipping sauce made from sugar, soy sauce, garlic, and muscovado or brown sugar. Can be seasoned with black pepper and labuyo chilis to make a spicy variant. Some vendors use lime- or lemon-flavored carbonated soft drinks. Used as a dipping sauce for deep-fried street foods like fishball and fried isaw |
| Palapa | | A spicy Maranao condiment consisting of finely chopped sakurab (white scallions), ginger, chilis like siling labuyo, and grated coconut cooked briefly and stored. It can also be dried. It is usually sautéed before using, or added as an ingredient to other dishes. |
| Sinamak | | Spiced vinegar of Visayan origin. Made with chilis (commonly siling labuyo), langkawas, garlic, peppercorns, and white onion pickled for at least three days. |
| Suka pinakurat | | A popular brand of spiced natural coconut sap vinegar from Iligan City, Mindanao. It is a natural vinegar of fermented coconut sap (tubâ) blended with siling labuyo (kulikot) and other spices. |
| Sarsa ng lechon, lechon sauce | | Also known as liver sauce, breadcrumb sauce, and all-around sauce. A sweet, tangy, light-brown sauce used as dipping sauce for roasted and fried dishes, especially lechon and lechon kawali. Made from ground liver or liver pâté, vinegar, sugar, and spices. |
| Sarsang miso, miso guisado | | A sauce made from miso stir-fried with minced garlic, diced tomatoes, vinegar, and ground black pepper. |
| Sarsang talong | | Literally 'eggplant sauce'. A sour condiment made from grilled eggplants, garlic and vinegar. Used as an accompaniment to cocidos. |
| Sarsang berenjas | | |
| Sukang may sili | | Cane or coconut vinegar spiced with labuyo peppers. Usually served as an accompaniment to grilled dishes, especially barbecue on a stick. |
| Suka at toyo | | Cane or coconut vinegar with soy sauce. This can also contain very hot labuyo peppers or diced onions, especially as an accompaniment to grilled meats (inihaw) and crispy pata. |
| Toyo't kalamansi | | Sometimes referred to simply as toyomansi; soy sauce with kalamansi lime juice. |

=== Pickles and fermented sauces ===
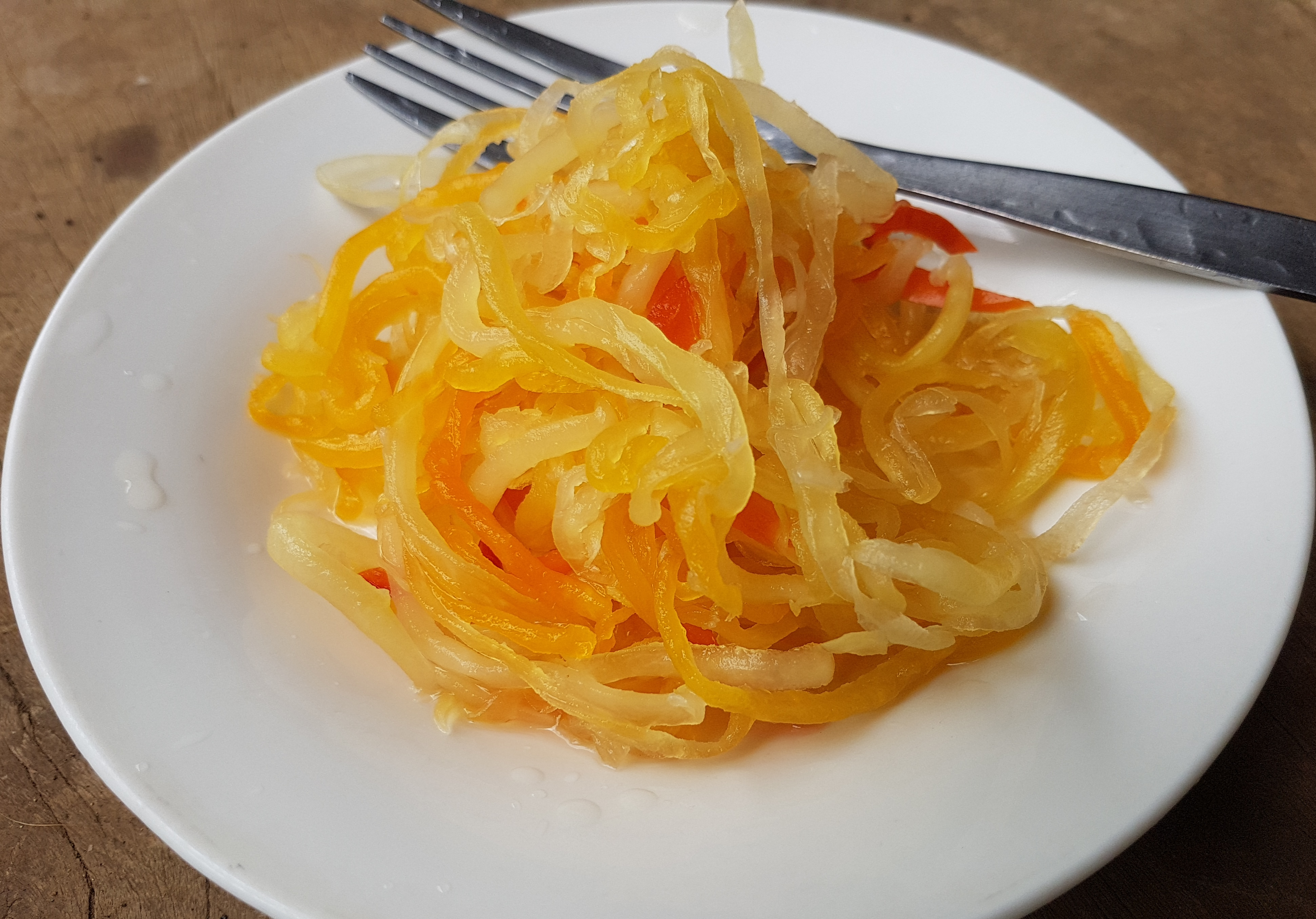
Atchara, made from pickled green papaya

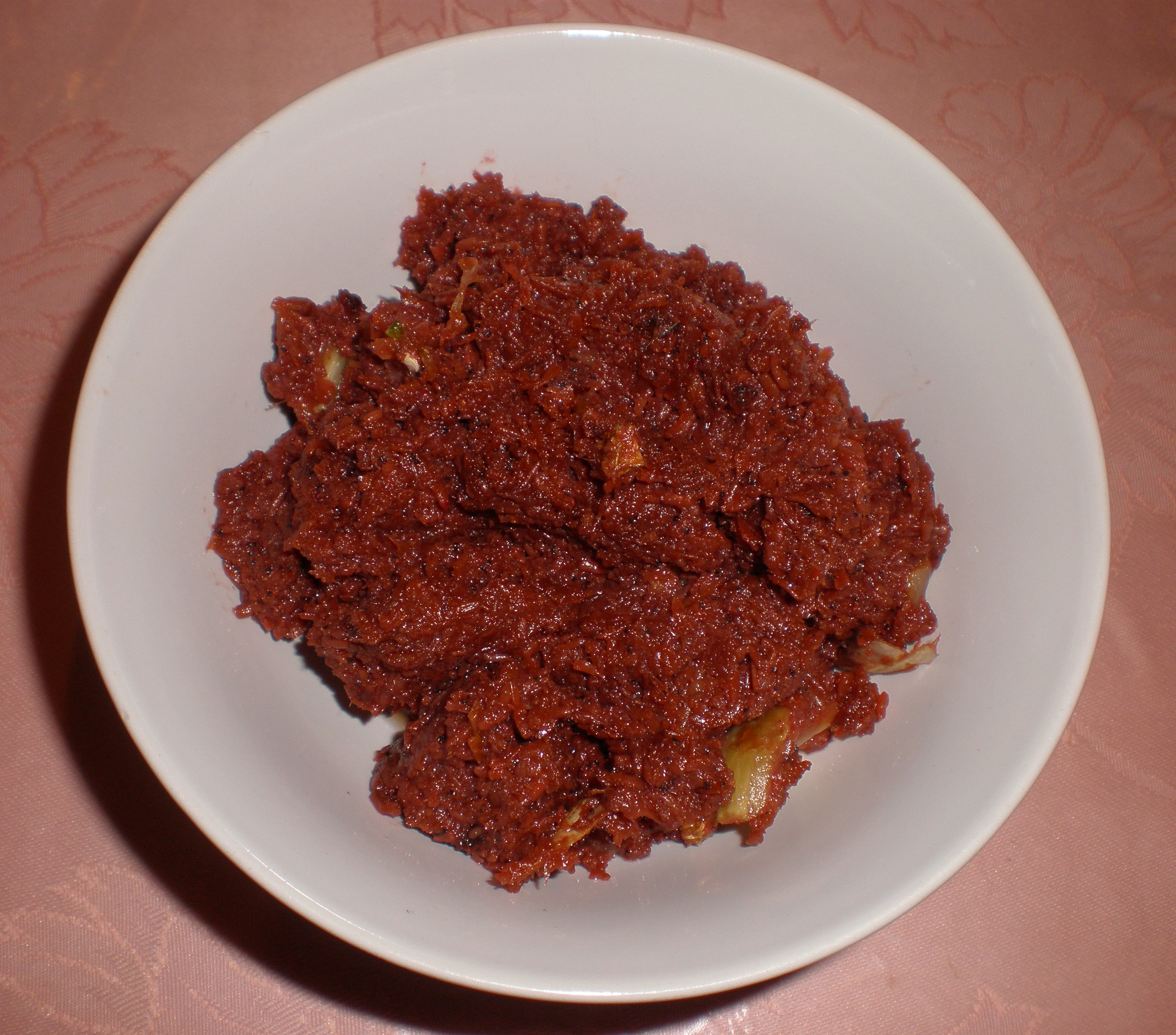
Bagoong made from fermented shrimp paste

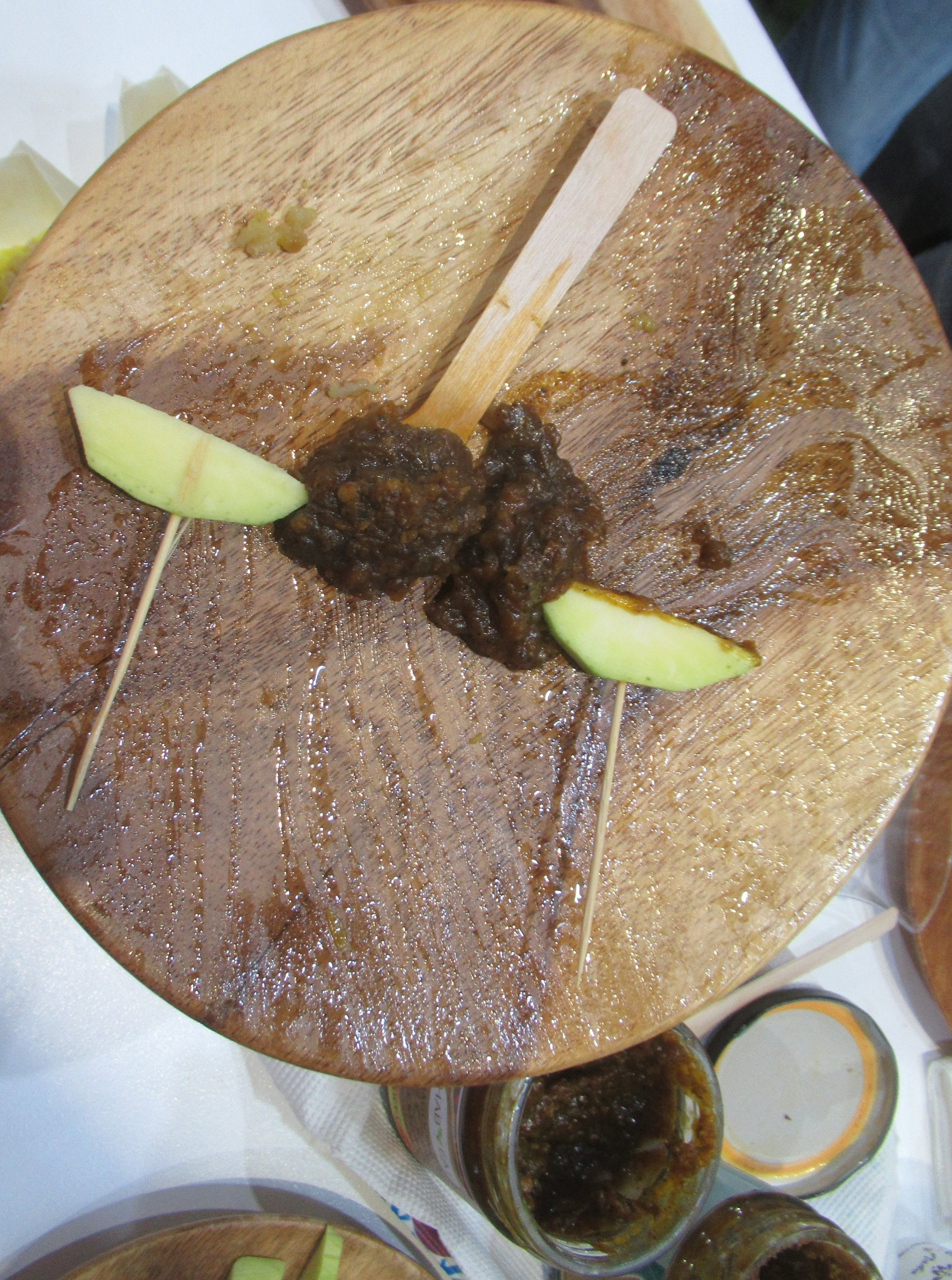
Vegan Bagoong

- Atchara - The method of pickling in a vinegar solution, usually a sweet pickling solution. By itself refers to the sweet pickled relish of unripe papaya. Used as a side dish, especially with grilled and fried meat and seafood.
  - Atcharang maasim (sour pickles)
  - Atcharang labóng (pickled bamboo shoots)
  - Atcharang dampalit (pickled sea purslane)
  - Atcharang ubod (pickled palm hearts)
  - Atcharang sayote (pickled chayote)
- Ensaladang mangga - green mango relish with tomatoes and onions.
- Bagoong - fermented salted anchovy paste or shrimp paste, particularly popular in the dish kare-kare, binagoongan, and binagoongang kangkong.
  - Bagoong alamang (shrimp paste)
  - Bagoong guisado - stir-fried bagoong, made with garlic, onions, tomatoes, sugar, and vinegar.
  - Bagoong isda (fermented fish)
  - Dayok - fermented fish entrails
- Buro, tapay - fermented rice, which can use red yeast rice (angkak). Used mainly as a condiment for steamed/boiled vegetables like okra, sweet potato leaves (talbos ng kamote), eggplant, etc.
  - Balao-balao - fermented rice with shrimp
  - Burong isda - fermented rice with fish
  - Burong mangga - pickled green mangoes. Commonly served with bagoong alamang (shrimp paste)
  - Burong mustasa - pickled mustard leaves
  - Tinapayan - fermented rice with dried fish
- Patis - Fish sauce. Sometimes spiced with labuyo peppers, or kalamansi lime juice, in which case it is called patismansi.
- Taba ng talangka - fermented paste derived from the salted roe and aligue (reddish or orange crab "fat") of the river swimming crabs (talangka). Can be sautéed in garlic and preserved in oil.

=== Dessert sauces ===
- Arnibal - syrup made from sugarcane molasses or palm sugar (panutsa)
- Latik - (Visayan usage only) a thick syrup made from coconut milk and sugar.

=== Flavoring ingredients and seasonings ===
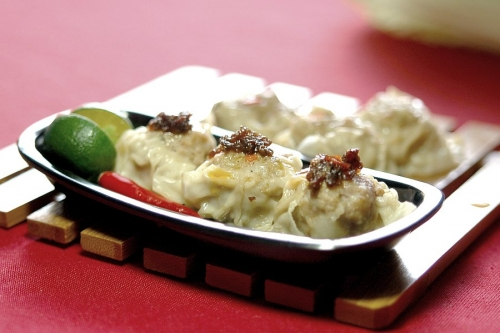
Calamansi is used in its partly ripe stage with soy sauce, vinegar, and/or siling labuyo as part of the most ubiquitous dipping sauce in Filipino cuisine, like in siomai

- Achuete (Annatto oil) - annatto seeds fried in oil which typically turn dishes a bright orange
- Asín tibuok
- Biasong or samuyao (small-fruited papeda)
- Kamias (bilimbi)
- Kasubha (safflower)
- Dayap
- Kiamoy powder
- Kunig or luyang dilaw (turmeric)
- Langkawas (galangal ginger)
- Tanglad (lemongrass)
- Dungon
- Pandan
- Calamansi - small Philippine limes
- Sakurab (sibujing)
- Siling labuyo - small native chili cultivar
- Tabon-tabon

== See also ==
- List of condiments
