= Lumlom =

Filipino fish dish

- Course: Main dish
- Place of origin: Philippines
- Region or state: Bulacan
- Similar dishes: Burong isda, Tinapayan, Balao-balao, Narezushi,

Lumlom is a pre-colonial Filipino fermented fish dish originating from the province of Bulacan in the Philippines. It is uniquely prepared by burying the fish (typically milkfish or tilapia) in mud for a day or two, allowing it to ferment slightly. After fermentation, it is cleaned and cooked as paksiw sa tuba, with spices, nipa vinegar, and sometimes coconut cream. It is popularly eaten as pulutan (accompanying dish for drinking alcohol).

== See also ==
- Kinilaw
- Binagoongan
- Daing
- Tapai
