= Enteromius perince =

Conservation status
- Least Concern (IUCN 3.1)

Scientific classification
- Kingdom: Animalia
- Phylum: Chordata
- Class: Actinopterygii
- Order: Cypriniformes
- Family: Cyprinidae
- Subfamily: Smiliogastrinae
- Genus: Enteromius
- Species: E. perince

Binomial name
- Enteromius perince Rüppell, 1835

Synonyms
- Barbus perince

Species of fish

Enteromius perince, the three-spot barb, is a species of ray-finned fish in the genus Enteromius which has a disjunct distributed from Guinea to Uganda, and throughout length of the Nile.

== Human use ==
At Shanhûr in Egypt, remains of a jar from the sixth- to seventh-century AD were unearthed that contained fish bones. The fish were apparently pickled to produce a dish similar to the modern fesikh (or faseekh). Among the ancient remains, barbs were plentiful, and Egyptians now still consider E. perince good for preparing fesikh, as it is traditionally done for the Sham el-Nessim (spring festival) celebrations.

== Footnotes ==
- Froese, Rainer; Pauly, Daniel (eds.). "Enteromius perince". FishBase.
