= Tinapayan =

Dish in Filipino cuisine

- Course: Main dish
- Place of origin: Philippines
- Region or state: Maguindanao
- Similar dishes: Burong isda, Narezushi, Pla ra

Tinapayan is a Filipino dish consisting of tapay (fermented cooked rice) and dried fish. It originates from the Maguindanao people. It is very similar to the more widespread northern dish burong isda, but differs in that the fish is dried first.

The process of preparing tinapayan is time-consuming, but results in a dish that can be preserved for a long time. The fish (usually snakehead or catfish) is first sun dried for three days, then it is covered in tapay (cooked rice fermented overnight in banana leaves) with ginger, chilis, and other spices and allowed to ferment further in a container for at least another week. After fermentation, the fish is shredded and deep-fried in oil before serving. It is usually eaten with white rice.

== See also ==
- Tapai
- Lumlom
- Balao-balao
- Daing
- Burong mangga
