= Meghalayan cuisine =

Food and culinary traditions of Meghalaya

Meghalayan cuisine is the Indigenous cuisine of the people of the Indian state of Meghalaya, namely the Khasi, Garo, and Jaintia tribes, as well as the migrant Gurkha population. Rice is the staple carbohydrate, and is couple with foraged vegetables, and fermented dishes. Previously, millet was also widely consumed by the people. Many of the Indigenous dishes are now recognised by the Slow Food movement, and are part of Ark of Taste catalogue.

British colonialism introduced potato mainly to feed its bureaucracy and military. Since then, it has gradually become an important part of the cuisine. It also gave rise to a flourishing baking culture with breads, cookies, and cakes now a tea-time favourites.

== Regional cuisines ==
There are three primary culinary regions in Meghalaya based on tribal population. Rice is the primary carbohydrate in all three regions, though millet was widely used before. Today, millet has become a heritage crop.

Colonial influence is strongly witnessed especially in the Khasi areas in the centre. Shillong as the colonial capital for the bureaucracy, military, and administration of Assam covering almost the entire Northeast India made it a culinary hub of unique colonial food culture.

=== Khasi ===
- Jadoh, a rice and meat preparation.
- Tungrymbai, fermented soybeans.
- Dohkhlieh, pork salad.
- Tungtap, fermented fish.
- Dohjem, pork in sesame seeds.
- Syrwa Tit Tung, wild mushroom soup.
- Doh Masi Khleh, beef salad.
- Syiar Nei-iong, chicken curry with black sesame.

=== New dishes ===
- Muli Khleh, radish with perilla seeds.
- Shana Nei-iong, black beans in sesame.

== Beverages ==
- Cha khoo, Jaintia rice concoction that yields a beverage similar to tea but leaves a bland coffee taste.
- Sha shiahkrot, Khasi tea that is derived when a root of the creeper Shiahkrot (Smilax ferox) is boiled.
