= Tungrymbai =

Fermented soy product

- Type: Fermented paste
- Course: Side dish
- Place of origin: Meghalaya
- Region or state: Northeast India
- Associated cuisine: Meghalayan cuisine
- Main ingredients: soybean

Tungrymbai or tung rymbái or "tungtoh" is a fermented soybean food traditionally prepared by the Khasi and Jaiñtia peoples of Meghalaya, Northeast India.

== Production ==
The soybeans are washed then boiled until they are soft. After boiling, the excess water is drained off and the beans are left to cool. The beans are then transferred to a bamboo basket lined with fresh slamet (Phrynium pubinerve) leaves. The leaves are then wrapped over the beans and hot charcoal is placed on top before more leaves are wrapped over once again. The entire basket is then placed inside a jute bag to ferment for three to four days by a fireplace. When the fermentation is complete, the beans are taken out and crushed in a mortar and pestle (thlong and synrei in Khasi).

== Preparation ==
Tungrymbai is usually prepared by crushing the fermented beans until it almost becomes a paste and fried in mustard oil with onion-ginger-garlic paste, black sesame seed paste, aromatics and pork.
