= Hentak =

Fermented fish paste

Hentak is a thick fermented paste in Manipuri cuisine made with sun-dried fish powder and the petioles of aroid plants. The small Indian flying barb fish are sun dried on bamboo trays and crushed to powder. The aroid petioles are cut into pieces and left in the sun for one day, then in equal parts with the fish powder the mixture is sealed in an earthen pot and fermented for around one week.

Hentak is a standard ingredient in Manipuri households, where it is consumed as a condiment with boiled rice or curry. Some preparations may include other plant ingredients like Colocasia esculenta. The standard ingredient of aroid petioles enhances flavor and also serves the purpose of aiding the fermentation process. In Manipur, hentak is a homemade preparation that is not produced for commercial markets. It is custom to serve this to expecting mothers and patients in convalescent.

Another fish paste from Northeast India is tungtap.

== See also ==
- Fermented fish
- Garum
- Bagoong
- Terasi
