= Bekasang =

Fermented food from Indonesia

Bekasang is a fermented fish condiment from Eastern Indonesia. It is usually found in areas around Sulawesi and Moluccas archipelago. The main component of this food is the stomach of fish that is fermented just like shrimp paste.

One manner of preparation uses salt and is fermented for about a month. Another way from Ternate, uses only the stomachs of tuna. There, it is customary to eat with Sago, garnished with lemon and bird's eye chili.

== See also ==
- Dayok, a similar Filipino preparation
- Shiokara, a similar Japanese preparation
