= Fesikh =

Traditional Egyptian fermented fish

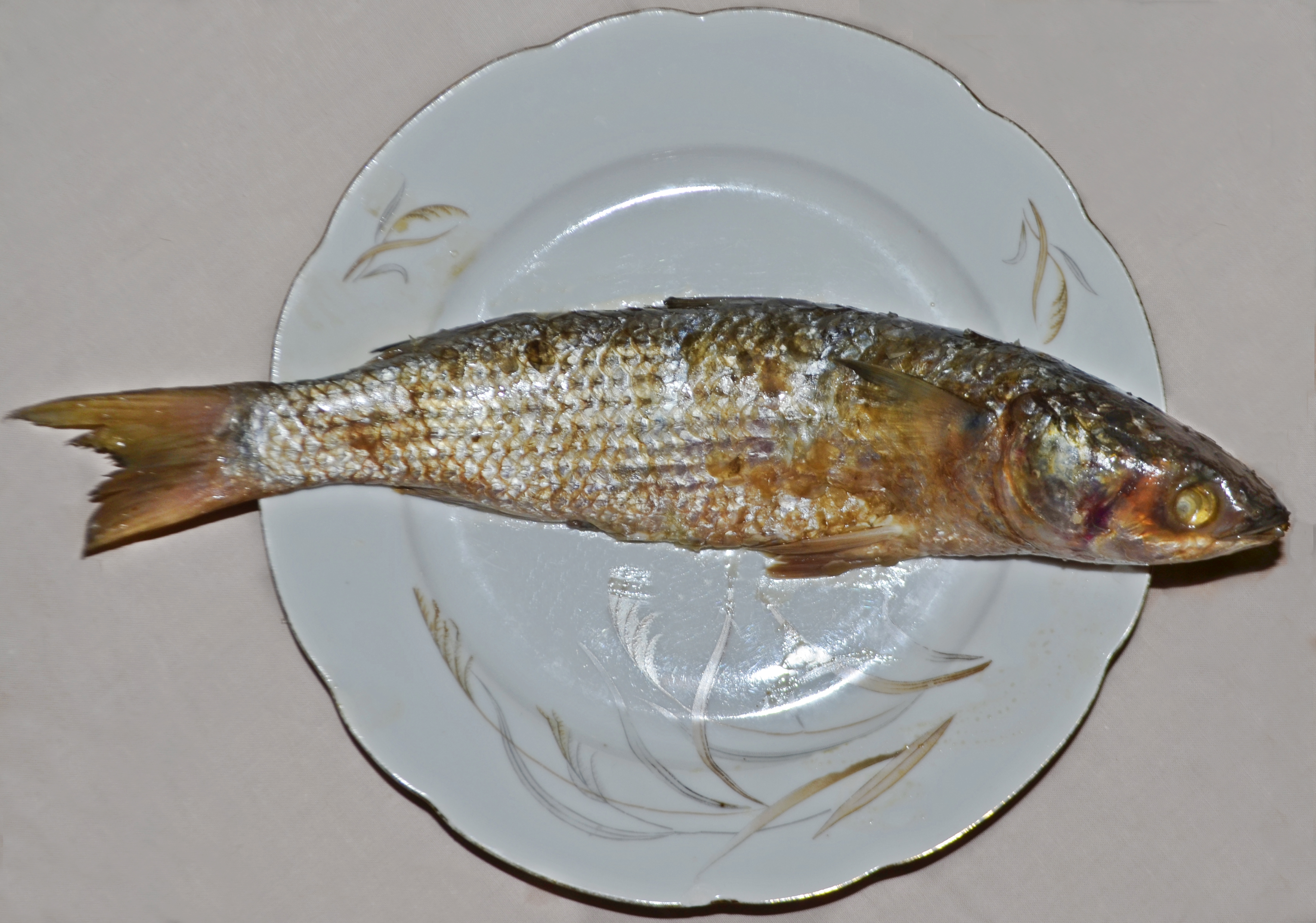
- Type: Fermented fish
- Place of origin: Egypt
- Main ingredients: Gray mullet, salt

Fesikh (Egyptian Arabic: فسيخ, romanized: fesīḵ, pronounced [fɪˈsiːx]) is a traditional Egyptian dish. It is consumed primarily, though not exclusively, during the Sham Ennessim festival, a spring celebration that traces its origins to ancient Egyptian times and is observed as a national holiday in Egypt. Fesikh consists of salted, pickled, fermented and dried gray mullet of the genus Mugil, a saltwater fish that lives in both the Mediterranean and the Red Seas. In western Egypt, whitefish is used as an alternative.

The consumption of fesikh has roots traceable to antiquity. In his Histories, the Greek historian Herodotus provides a detailed account of Egyptian dietary habits. Among other practices, he records that the Egyptians "eat fish either raw and sun-dried, or preserved with brine". The methods described by Herodotus parallel those used in contemporary fesikh, indicating a long-standing culinary tradition maintained from antiquity to the present.

== Hazard ==
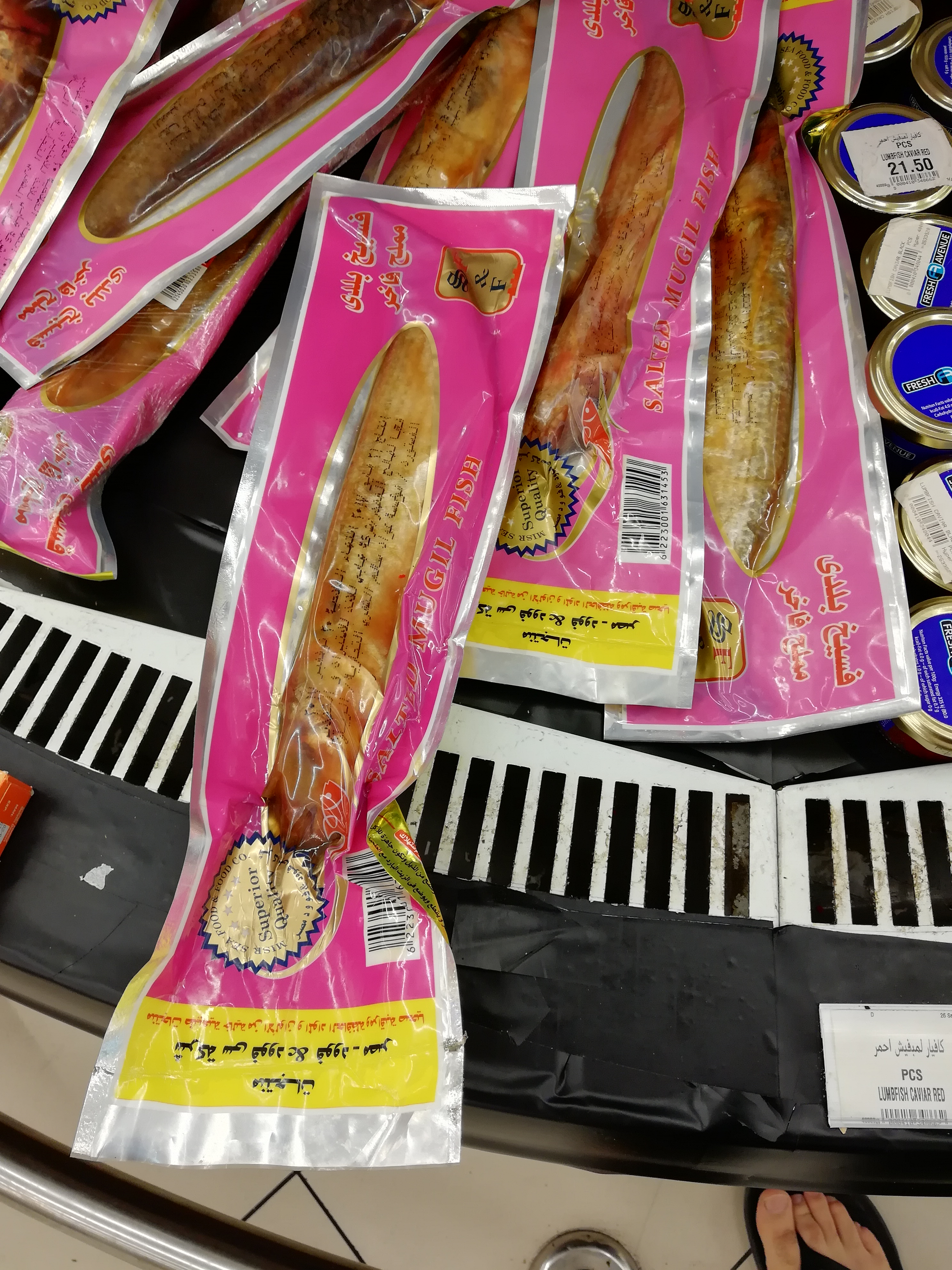
Packaged fesikh at a supermarket in Saudi Arabia

Each year, reports of a few cases of food poisoning involving incorrectly prepared fesikh appear in Egyptian periodicals, especially during the Sham el-Nessim festival, when Egyptians consume this traditional pickled fish.

In April 2012, the Canadian Food Inspection Agency issued recalls for whole fesikh mullet, cut up fesikh mullet in oil, and whole fesikh shad that were sold from a store in Toronto. There were three reported illnesses associated with the consumption of the products, which may have been contaminated with Clostridium botulinum bacteria.

These reports never deterred the Egyptians from eating this celebratory dish, however, as they pertain only to improperly prepared fesikh and to expired or contaminated fesikh; the Egyptian Ministry of Health constantly urges Egyptians to buy their fesikh from known and trusted vendors and to check expiration dates, or to prepare it properly if they do so at home, and stores selling the fish are constantly investigated.

== In different regions ==
Fesikh spread from Egypt to the Gaza Strip, where it is traditionally made for Eid al-Fitr and is stuffed with onions and fried rather than eaten as is, Gazan fesikh is also made into a yahni.

== See also ==
- Egyptian cuisine
- List of Middle Eastern dishes
- List of African dishes
- Surströmming
- Hákarl
- Hongeo-hoe
