= Spiced vinegar =

Philippine condiment

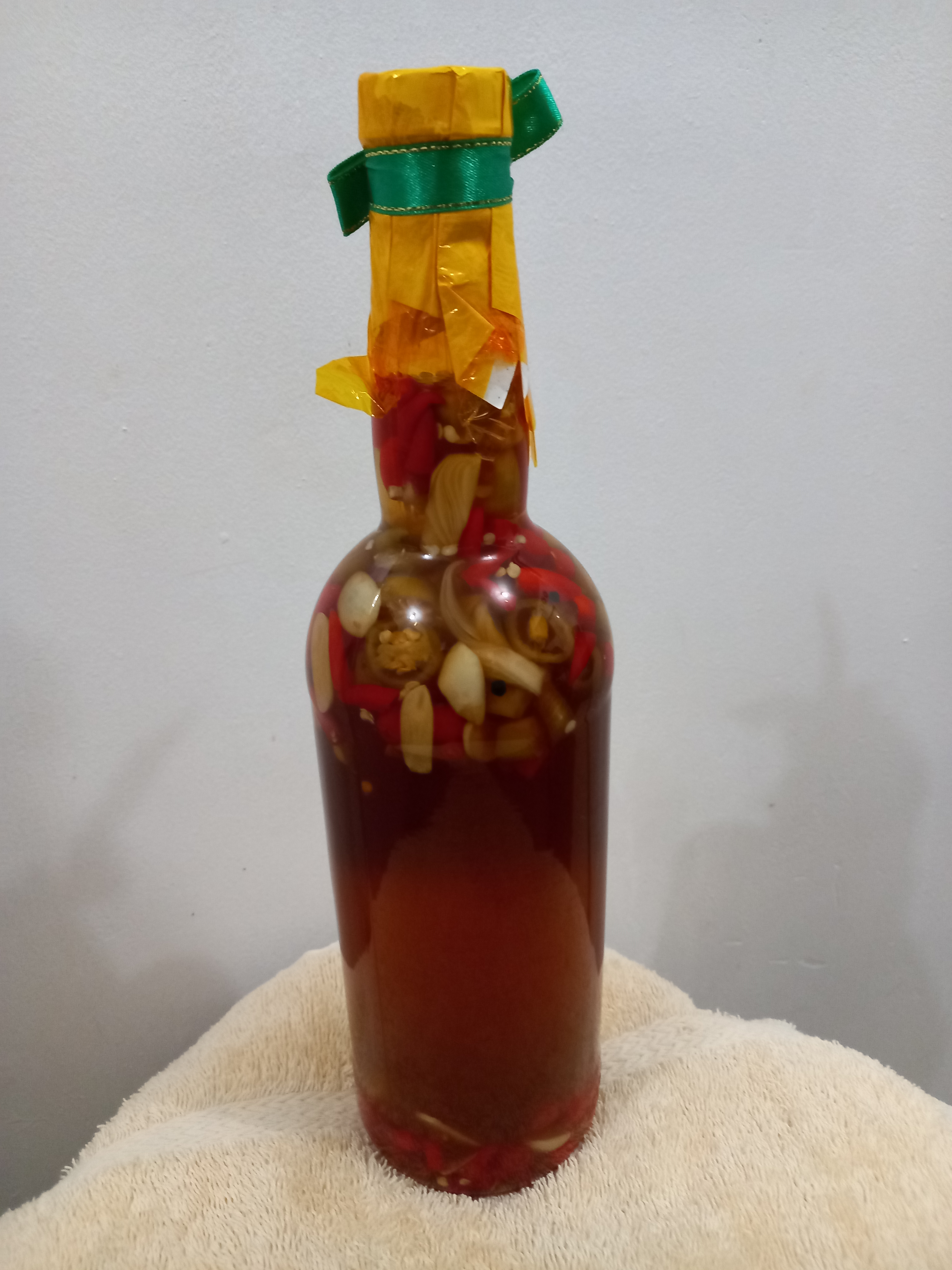
- Alternative names: Sukang maanghang
- Type: Condiment
- Place of origin: Philippines
- Associated cuisine: Philippines
- Main ingredients: Coconut vinegar, chili pepper
- Ingredients generally used: Garlic, ginger and/or galangal
- Variations: Sukang Pinakurat, Sinamak, Sukang Quezon

Spiced vinegar is a type of Philippine vinegar condiment made of vinegar, e.g. fermented coconut sap (Cebuano: sukang tuba), infused with spices, primarily siling labuyo and garlic.

A variation of spiced vinegar was popularized by Rene Jose B. Stuart del Rosario of Iligan City in 2000 where the spices are finely chopped possibly with the use of a blender or food processor. This is now a mass-produced product under the brand name Sukang Pinakurat (derived from the Cebuano word kurat, meaning to "surprise" or "frighten"). In 2004, due to its popularity, the Stuart del Rosario family registered trademarks for sukang pinakurat, sukang waykurat, and sukang kuratsoy with the Intellectual Property Office of the Philippines.

== Flavor and uses ==
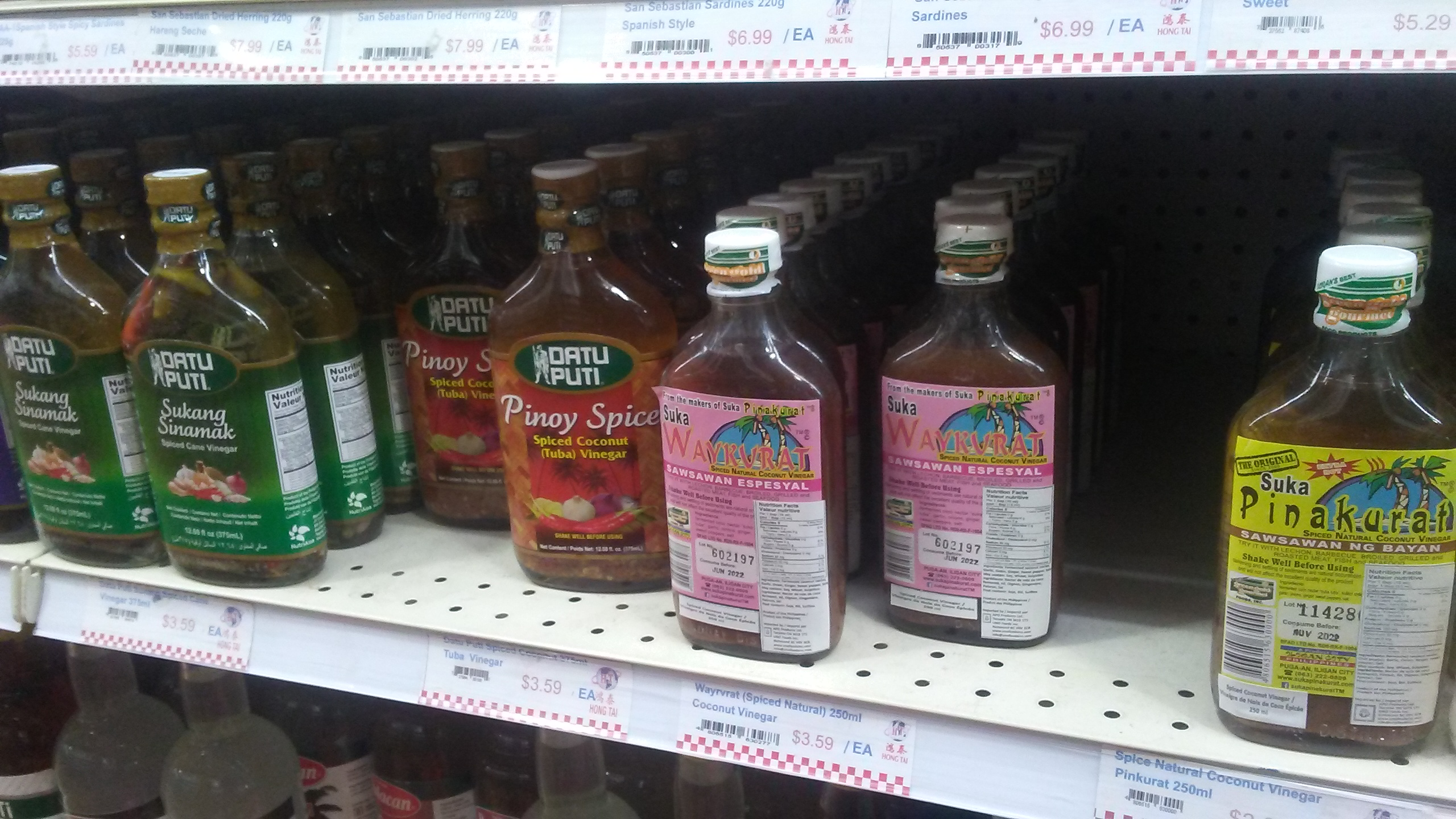
Bottles of spiced vinegar brands and variants.

In Filipino households, this condiment is used on many assorted dishes, mostly fried dishes (including lumpiang prito) and lechon.
