= Pla ra =

Southeast Asian fermented fish seasoning

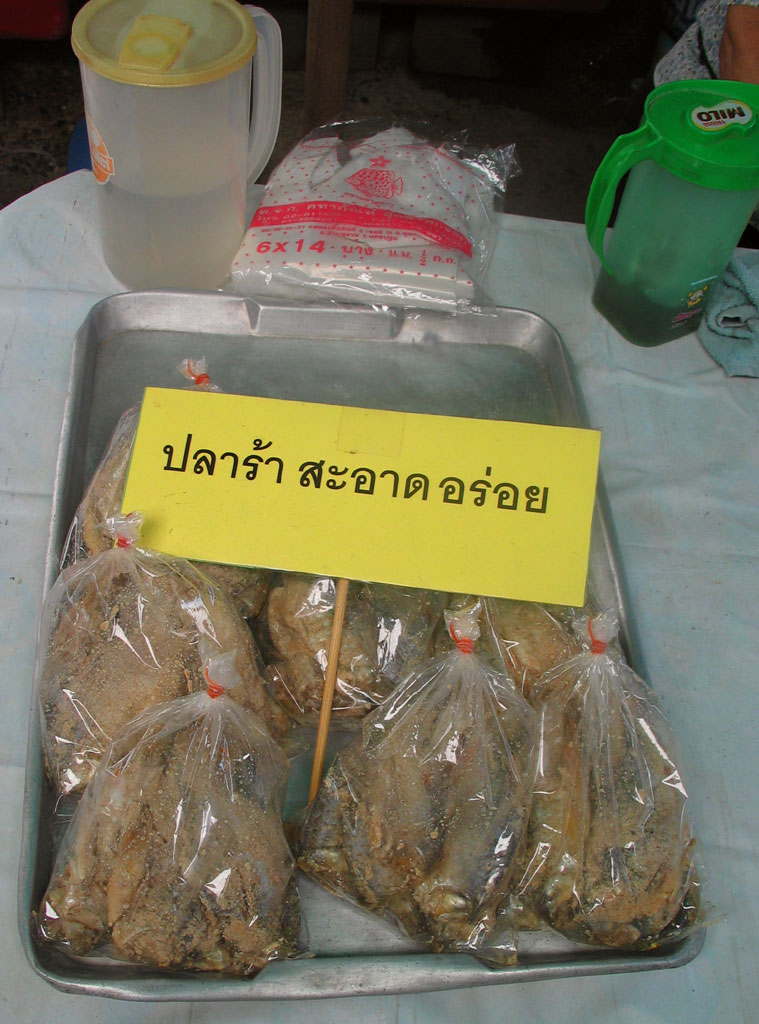
Pla ra at the old market of Don Wai, Nakhon Pathom

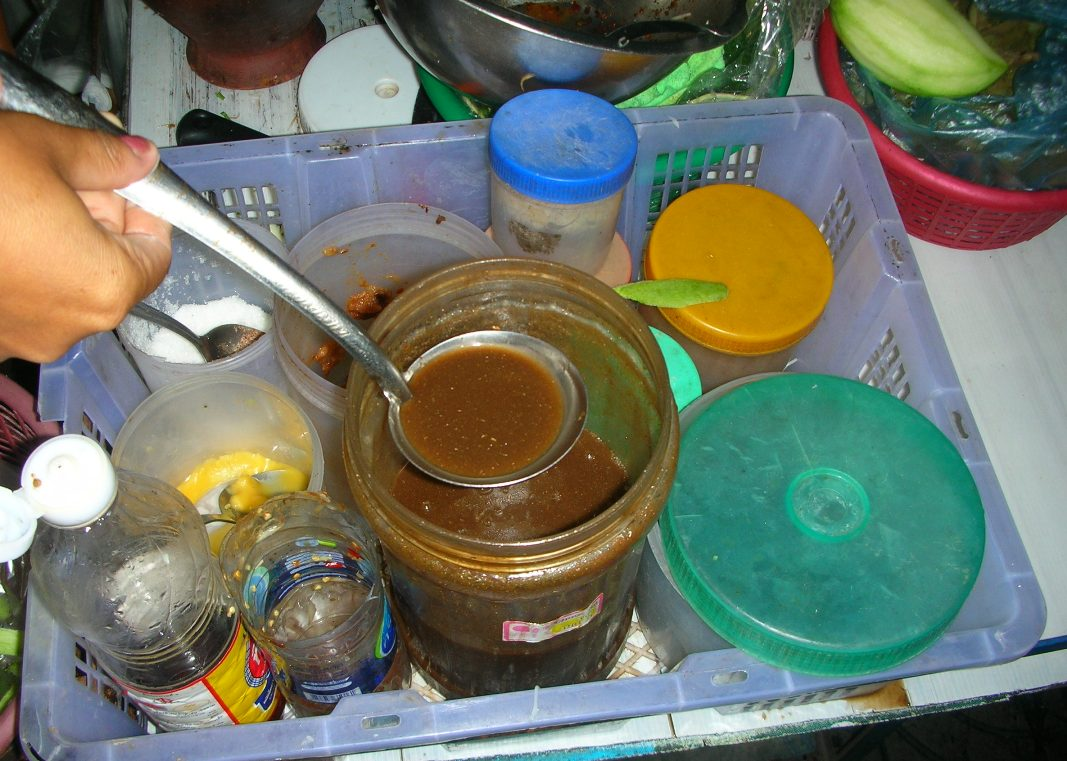
The pot of pla ra in a som tam vendor's cart, Bangkok

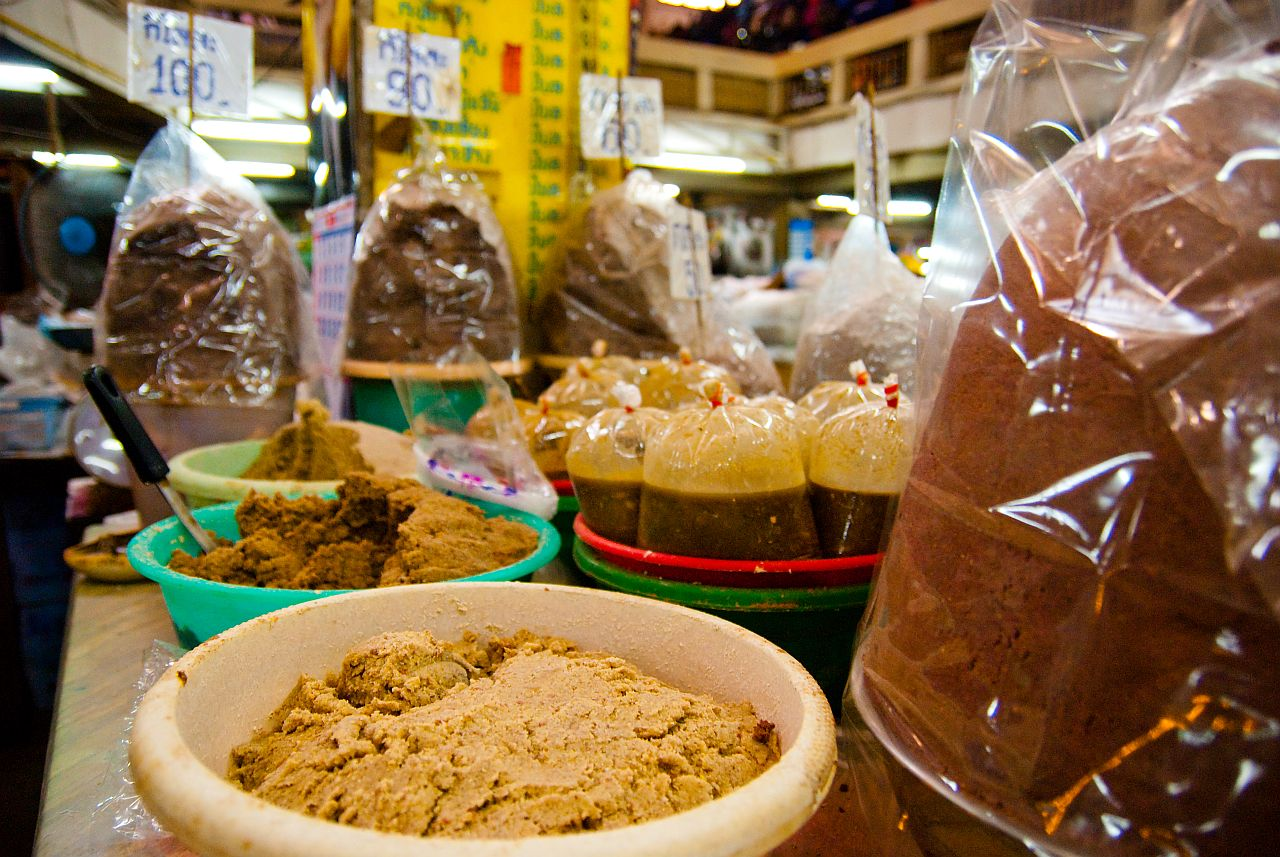
Baskets and mounds of Thai shrimp paste (kapi) at Warorot market, Chiang Mai, Thailand

Pla ra (Thai: ปลาร้า, pronounced [plāː ráː]; Northeastern Thai: ปลาแดก, pronounced [pàː dɛ̀ːk]), similar to padaek in Laos, is a traditional Thai seasoning produced by fermenting fish with rice bran or roasted rice flour and salt in a closed container for at least six months. Fermented fish seasoning is commonly found in Cambodian, Lao, Mon, Thai, and Vietnamese cuisine. Pla ra has a very strong smell, which is considered unpleasant by some people. Its flavors are salty and sour, depending on the amount of salt put in and lactic acid resulting from fermentation process.

== History ==
Pla ra was a common food in the Ayutthaya Kingdom. French diplomat Simon de la Loubère, who visited Siam during the mid-Ayutthaya period (late 17th century CE), wrote about pla ra:

As we eat less in Summer than in Winter, they eat less than we, by reason of the continual Summer in which they live; their common Food is Rice and Fish. The Sea affords them very delicate small Oysters, very excellent small Turtles, Lobsters of all sizes, and admirable Fish, the sorts of which are unknown to us. Their River is also very plentiful of Fish, and principally very good and curious Eels: But they make little esteem of fresh Fish.

Amongst the Fresh-water Fish, they have some little ones of two sorts,* which do here deserve to be mention'd. They call them Pla out, and Pla cadi, that is to say the Fish out, and the Fish cadi. To free me from all doubts, some have assur'd me, that after they have salted them together, as the Siameses us'd to do, if they leave them in an earthen Pot in their Pickle, where they soon corrupt, by reason they salt ill at Siam, then, that is to say when they are corrupted, and as it were in a very liquid Paste, they do exactly follow the flux and reflux of the Sea, growing higher and lower in the Pitcher as the Sea ebbs or flows. Mr. Vincent gave me a Pot thereof at his arrival in France, and assur'd me that this Experiment was true, and that he had seen it; but I cannot add my Testimony thereunto, by reason I was too late advertised thereof at Siam, to have an occasion of ascertaining it by my own Eyes; and that the Pot which Mr. Vincent gave me, and which I brought to Paris, perform'd this Effect no more: perhaps because the Fish were too much corrupted, or that their virtue of imitating the flux and reflux of the Sea continues only a certain time.

The Siameses find much difficulty to make good Salt,* by reason that Meats do hardly take Salt in excessive hot Countries; but they love Fish ill season'd and dry better than fresh, even stinking Fish displeaseth them not no more than rotten Eggs, Locusts, Rats, Lizards, and most Insects: Nature doubtless framing their Appetite to things, the Digestion whereof is more easie to them. And it may be that all these things have not such an ill taste as we imagine.

A Siamese makes a very good Meal with a pound of Rice a day,* which amounts not to more than a Farthing; and with a little dry or salt Fish, which costs not more. The Arak or Rice Brandy is not worth above two Sols for that quantity, which amounts to a Parisian Pint; after which it is no wonder if the Siameses are not in any great care about their Subsistence, and if in the Evening there is heard nothing but Singing in their Houses.

Their Sauces are plain, a little Water with some Spices, Garlic, Chibols,* or some sweet Herb, as Baulm. They do very much esteem a liquid Sauce, like Mustard, which is only Cray-Fish corrupted, because they are ill salted; they call it Capi. They gave Mr. Ceberet some Pots thereof, which had no bad Smell.

explained that the main source of food was rice and fish. Siamese people did not like to eat fresh fish. Fermented fish was popular as much as spicy Thai dip or nam phrik. When he returned to France, he brought some pla ra with him.

== Classification ==
Pla ra is classified by its main ingredients. Pla ra that is fermented with roasted rice powder becomes yellow with a soft texture and distinctive smell. Mostly used as a paste, this type of pla ra is usually produced in central Thailand. This type of pla ra usually has striped snakehead fish or catfish as a main ingredient. The other type is pla ra fermented with rice bran. The product's color is clear black with a stronger smell. The fish is softer and smaller. It is mostly found in northeastern Thailand as an ingredient, or as a raw food.

Pla ra that uses fresh fish is called pla ra sot. Its flavors are salty with a little bit sour from lactic acid. Pla ra lom uses dead fish with has an autolysis reaction until it has an unpleasant smell, or uses fish soaked in water for 12–24 hours until it is softer.

== Process ==
The methods to produce pla ra can differ. One method has two phases for making it. The first phase is to ferment fish with salt until it is softer, and the next phase is to ferment it with rice bran or roasted rice powder for its scent and flavor. A second approach is to ferment the fish with salt and coarsely pounded, toasted, raw, glutinous rice for at least six months.

The process starts with cutting the fish into small pieces and fermenting it with salt. After 24 hours, the fish is arranged in a container (mostly a pot) until it is tightly packed and filled with salt water afterwards. The container is sealed for three months. After three months, a first-stage pla ra us mixed with rice bran or roasted rice powder. Then, it is rearranged in the container and sealed for two months or more.

In 2018, the Thai Ministry of Agriculture published regulations to ensure the quality and hygiene of commercially made pla ra.

== Dishes ==
Pla ra is usually eaten raw or as a chilli fish sauce (nam phrik pla ra). This dish is made of roasted green pepper, garlic, shallots, and boiled fish meat. All of these ingredients are ground together. Then boiled fermented fish liquid, fish sauce, and lime juice are added to the mixture. It is used as a side dish for dipping vegetables or eaten with rice. Pla ra can also be processed into a powder by baking it with some spices until it is dry and then grinding it all together. Nam phrik pla ra and pla ra song krueng or lon pla ra are common in Thailand's Central Region.

== Nutrition ==
Composition of pla ra.

| Composition | Amount |
|---|---|
| Protein | 16.08–18.94% |
| Moisture | 28.90–71.48% |
| Fat | 0.71–3.20% |
| Salt | 5.23–9.14% |
| Calcium | 1505.06 mg % |
| Phosphorus | 661.75 mg % |
| Vitamin B12 | 2.175±1.78 mg % |
| pH | 4.5–6.2 |
| Lactic acid | 0.3–1.90 |
| Microorganisms | 2.2 million—88 million |

Many species of bacteria have been found in pla ra:

- Assorted species of Pediococcus, primarily P. halophilus
- Assorted species of Staphylococcus, primarily S. epidermidis
- Assorted species of Micrococcus
- Bacillus subtilis and B. licheniformis
- Other, nonspore-forming Gram-positive bacteria
- Other Gram-negative bacteria

P. halophilus is most prevalent when pla ra is fermented for three to five months. A study found that 90% of samples from markets contain this species of bacterium, so it is assumed to have an important role in the fermenting process, especially for pla ra's taste and aroma. Other Pediococcus species also have a role in the taste and aroma, but not as much as P. halophilus. Species of Staphylococcus, Micrococcus, and Bacillus act in protein degradation.

== Health issue ==
When using pla ra as an ingredient for uncooked food, it is easily contaminated. An example is nam phrik (chilli fish sauce), which uses pla ra as an ingredient. Nam phrik is not cooked and is often kept for one or two meals. After a while, it contains significant levels of pathogens and a high microorganism count. In some cases, nam phrik had both E. coli and S. aureus present. This is because the acid from tamarind made the pH less than 4.6, which prevents the growth of most pathogens. Pla ra before reheating is contaminated with S. aureus, but the coliform is low and it is destroyed by cooking.

== Other uses ==
In a recent move by the police and redevelopment workers to evict vendors from a market in the Khlong Toei District in Bangkok, the local vendors barricaded themselves in the market. During the scuffles that ensued, the traders made "stink bombs" with thin plastic bags filled with pla ra and hurled them at policemen. On 1 February 2010 bags of excrement and pla ra were thrown at Thai Prime Minister Abhisit Vejjajiva's house.

== See also ==
- Budu – Fish sauce originating from east coast of Peninsular Malaysia
- Burong isda – Filipino dish of pickled rice and fish
- Conpoy – Cantonese dried scallop
- Fish sauce – Condiment made from fish
- Kaeng tai pla – Southern Thai curry, made with a salty sauce made from fermented fish entrails
- List of fish sauces
- Narezushi – Japanese dish with vinegared rice
- Padaek – Lao pickled or fermented fish condiment
- Prahok – Cambodian salted and fermented fish paste
- Saeu-jeot – Fermented shrimp in Korean cuisine
- Shrimp paste – Fermented condiment
