= Tungtap =

Fermented fish paste found in Meghalayan cuisine

Tungtap is a fermented fish paste found in Meghalayan cuisine, consumed by the Khasi and Garo people. Like hentak, it is made with Indian flying barb or pool barb fish that are sun-dried, salted and fermented in a sealed earthenware vessel. The vessel is covered with pandan and tied with threads. It can be used in curry or eaten with rice, mixed with onion, garlic, chillis and Zanthoxylum nitidum and eaten as a pickle or chutney. Tungtap has a spongy, soft texture.
