= Balao-balao =

Filipino fermented shrimp and rice condiment

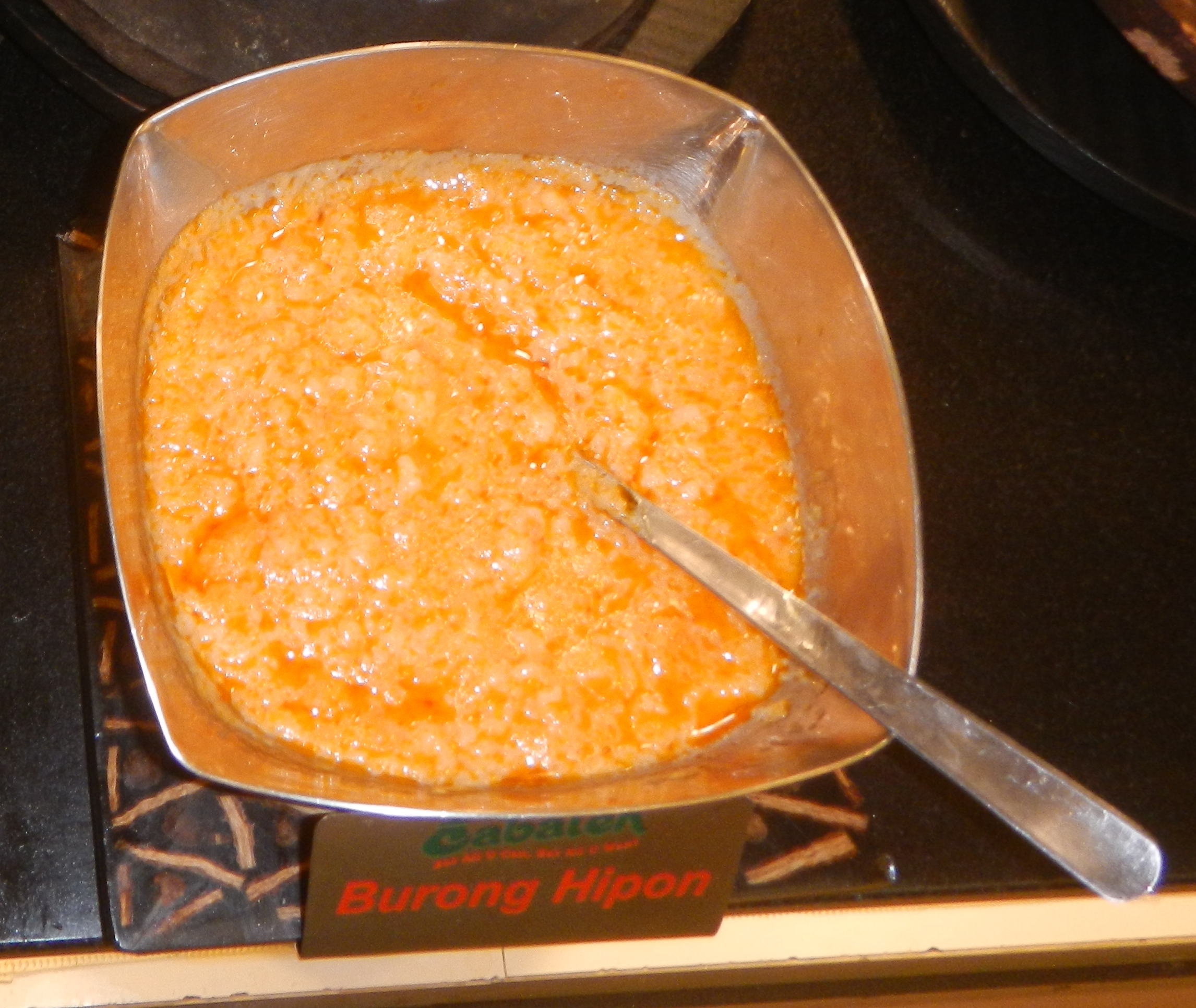
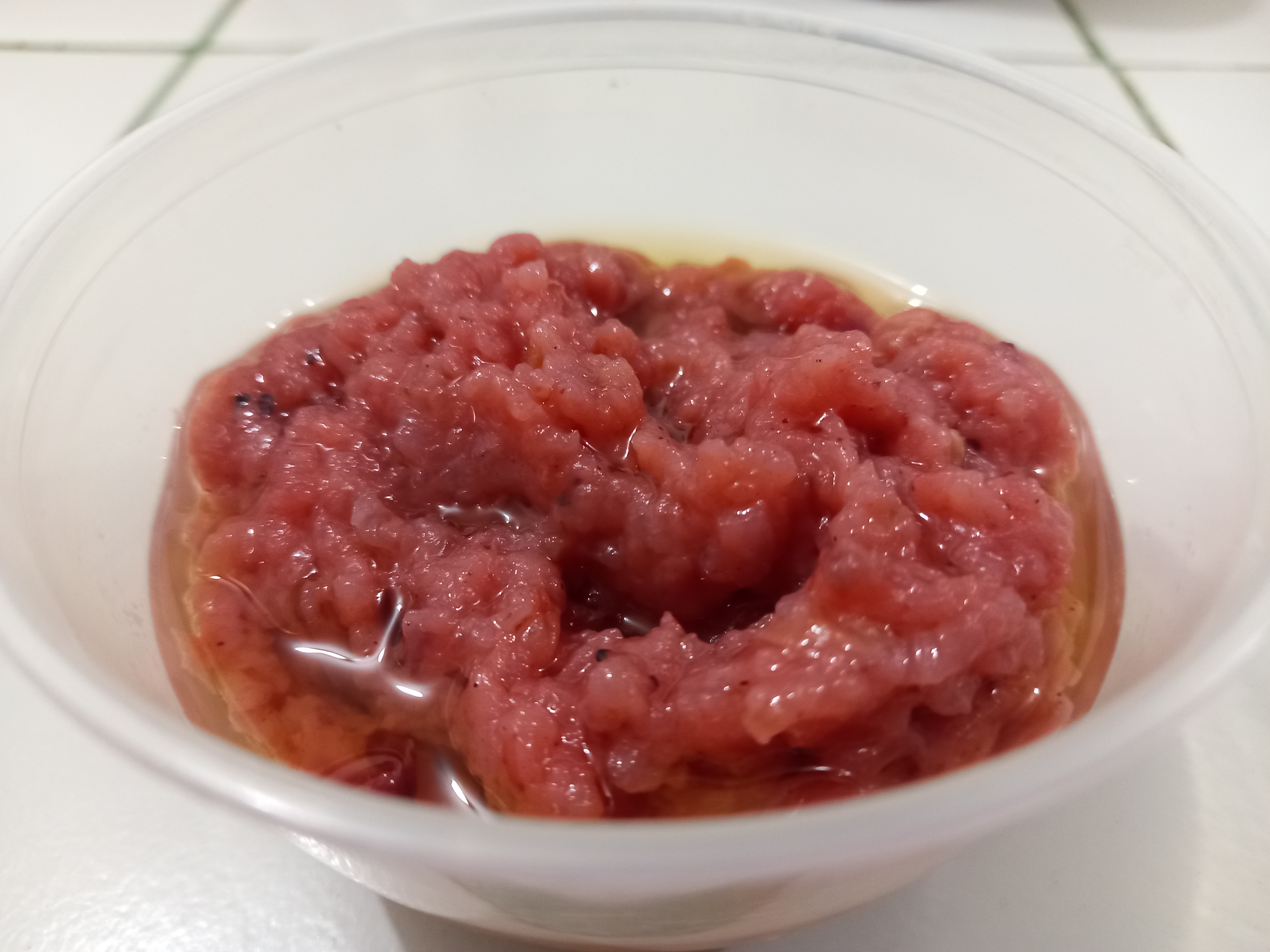
- Top: Burong hipon in a buffet in Bulacan; Bottom: Home prepared Balao-balao
- Alternative names: Balaw-balaw, burong hipon
- Type: Condiment
- Course: Main dish
- Place of origin: Philippines
- Region or state: Central Luzon (Pampanga, Bulacan)
- Serving temperature: Room temperature / warm
- Main ingredients: Cooked rice, Alamang, Angkak (fermenting yeast)
- Similar dishes: Tinapayan, Burong isda

Balao-balao, also known as burong hipon ("pickled shrimp"), is a Filipino condiment of cooked rice and whole raw shrimp (esp. Alamang) fermented with salt and angkak (red yeast rice). Once stir-fried, it can be eaten as is with rice or used as a dipping sauce for grilled or fried dishes. Depending on the salt content, it is fermented for several days to weeks. The lactobacilli involved in the fermentation process of the rice produces lactic acid which preserves and softens the shrimp.

== See also ==
- Burong isda
- Binagoongan
- Dayok
- Tapai
- Kinilaw
- Bagoong alamang
