= Sham Ennessim =

Egyptian spring festival

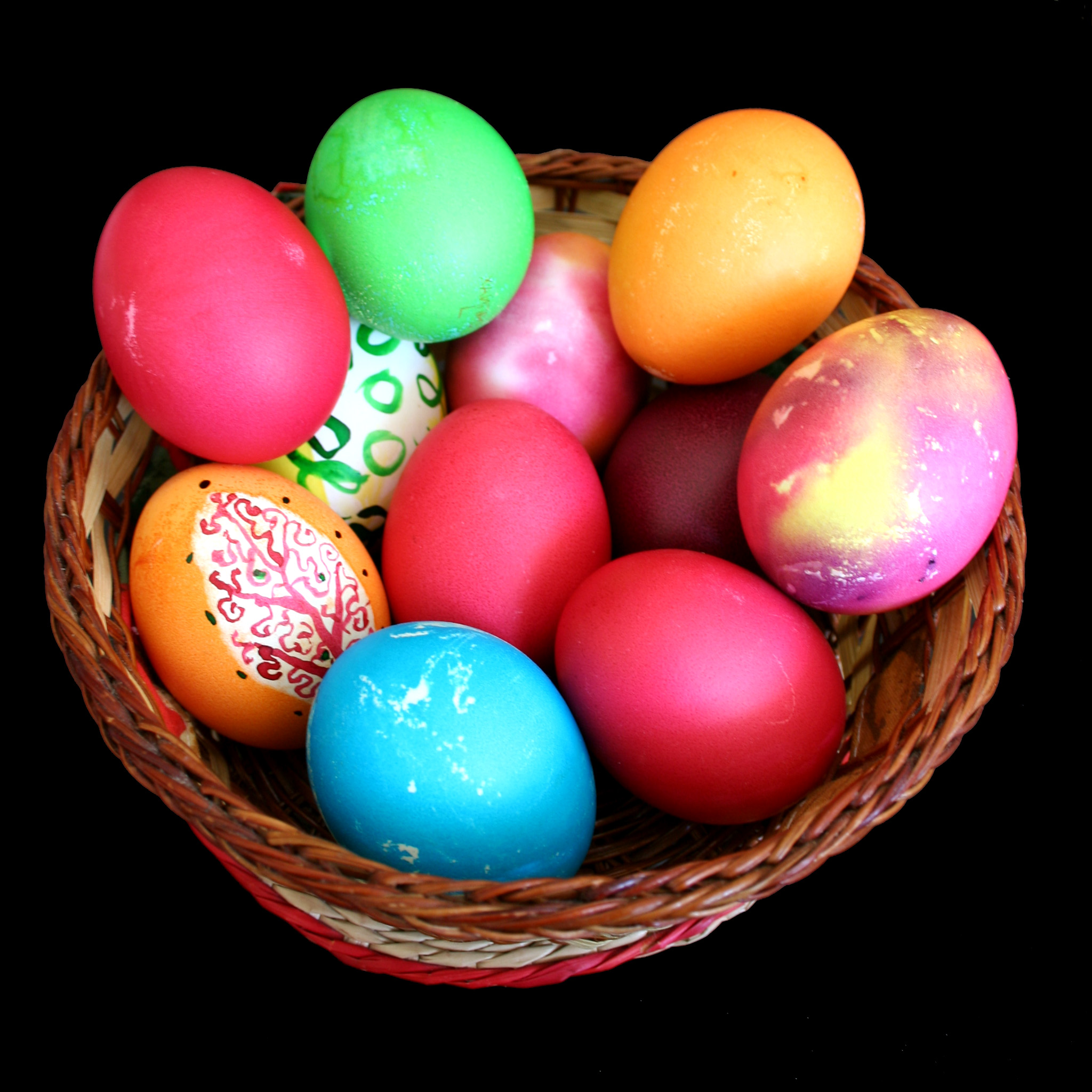
- Colored eggs are commonly made in Sham Ennessim
- Official name: شم النسيم Sham en-Nesīm
- Observed by: Egyptians
- Type: Cultural, seasonal, and agricultural
- Celebrations: Visiting public places; Going on picnics; Eating fesikh, smoked herring, and lupin beans; Coloring and eating boiled eggs
- Date: The day after Eastern Christian Easter
- Frequency: Annual

Sham Ennessim (Arabic: شم النسيم, Sham Ennesim, IPA: [ˈʃæmm ennɪˈsiːm]) is a festival marking the beginning of spring, celebrated by Egyptians of all religions. It is an official public holiday in Egypt. Sham Ennessim always falls on Easter Monday, which is the day after Easter, in accordance with the Orthodox Church. The Arabic name Sham Ennesim translates into "Smelling in the Zephyrs".

The festival is characterized by a number of traditional practices. Egyptians typically spend the entire day outdoors, engaging in picnics in public gardens, green spaces, along the Nile, or at the zoo. The customary foods consumed on this occasion include fesikh, a fermented, salted, and dried grey mullet, along with lettuce, green onions, and lupin beans. A widespread tradition associated with the festival is the coloring of boiled eggs, which are subsequently eaten or exchanged as gifts.

== History ==
The exact origin of the festival remains insufficiently documented; however, it is generally held that Sham Ennessim has been celebrated by Egyptians from as far back as ancient Egypt. It has been proposed that the modern name is derived from the harvest season, Šmw (Shemu), and that the festival itself is a continuation of early forms of springtime festivities dating back over 4,500 years.

The arrival of spring was considered a time of profound importance for the ancient Egyptians, as it signaled the beginning of the agricultural cycle, an essential phase for sowing, cultivation, and eventual harvest. The seasonal shift held deep symbolic and practical significance in the rhythms of Egyptian life.

Throughout medieval Egypt, Sham Ennessim remained widely observed among Egyptians, persisting across successive regimes including the Fatimids, Ayyubids, and Mamluks. The festival retained a largely non-religious character, maintained instead through its integration into local custom and seasonal rhythms. Its position in the calendar reflects the continuity of earlier seasonal rites that predate both Christianity and Islam in Egypt. Participation extended across religious lines, with Muslims, Christians and Jews in Egypt marking the day through shared customs.

The Fatimid rule in particular paid special attention to Sham Ennessim, allowing it to flourish as a public festival while incorporating aspects of it into official state ceremonial life. Although the celebration was rooted in pre-Islamic traditions, the Fatimid regime did not suppress its observance. Instead, it permitted the continuation of established customs and at times adopted a participatory role in their public expression.

Notably, the Fatimid state organized formal celebrations of Sham Ennessim. These included an official procession led by the caliph and accompanied by high-ranking state officials. The event was coordinated by the court preacher, assisted by a cadre of appointed captains, and proceeded through the streets of Cairo as part of a large public spectacle.

Foods such as fesikh, green onions, lettuce, eggs and malana (chickpeas) remained central to the celebration. A tradition persisted during medieval Egypt of writing wishes on eggshells and hanging them from trees, a practice likely derived from earlier symbolic uses of the egg in ritual contexts. It was believed that as the sun rose and its rays touched the eggs, the wishes written upon them would manifest. Women would also make necklaces of lotus flowers to give to their husbands.

The day was typically spent outdoors, with families visiting gardens, riverbanks, and public green spaces. In Cairo, gatherings occurred along the Nile, near the Khalij canal, and in the open areas of Fustat. Public spaces often hosted vendors selling seasonal foods and offering basic entertainment. In rural areas, agricultural communities observed the day with meals and informal celebrations tied to the agricultural cycle.

=== Symbolism of foods ===
The food consumed during Sham Ennessim had long held symbolic meanings in ancient Egypt, such as lettuce, which was considered a symbol of fertility, and was associated with the god Min. Depictions of his harvest festival show his followers carrying lettuce. Pliny, the Roman historian, wrote that onions were venerated as deities in ancient Egypt. The agricultural cycle of onions influenced certain aspects of ancient Egyptian liturgy. Onions were also used in the embalming of the dead, and have been found within certain body cavities of mummies. During festivals, followers of Sokar wore strings of onions around their necks as part of ritual observances. Eggs also held symbolic importance in ancient Egypt, representing the belief that the universe was created from a cosmic egg.

== Date ==
The Coptic calculation of Easter uses the Aqbati method, invented by Pope Demetrius (189-231 AD) to ensure it would always be on the same date as Easter celebrated by other Christian groups, due to an early Byzantine decree.

At one point, Muslims in Giza celebrated the mawlid of Abu Huraira on the same date as Sham Ennissim.

The Islamic calendar being lunar and thus unfixed relative to the solar year, the date of Sham Ennessim remained on the Christian-linked date.

== Customs ==
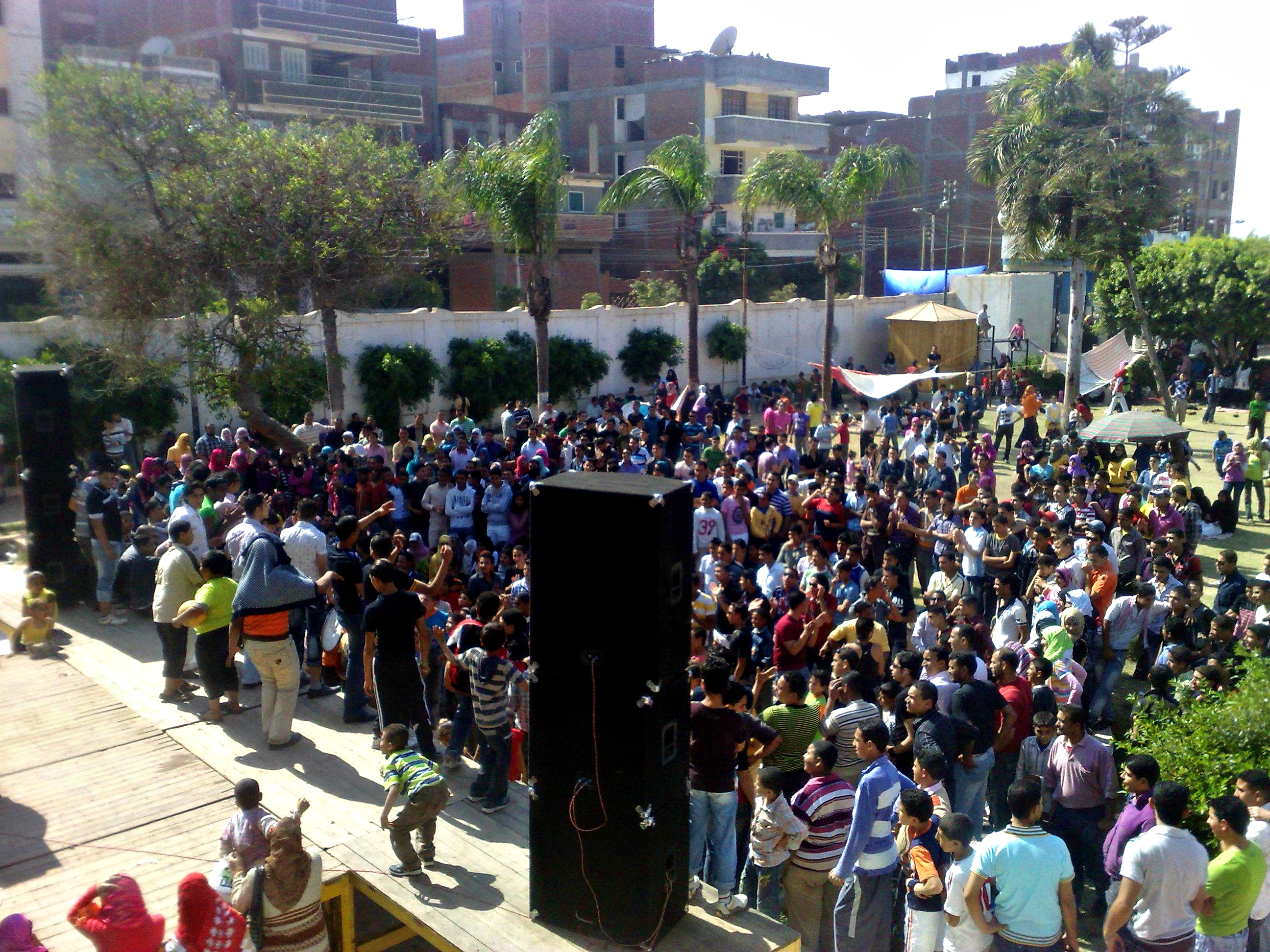
Egyptians attending a Shem Ennessim celebration in 2010 at Desouk Stadium.

The festival was historically a religious occasion during which early Egyptians made offerings of salted fish, lettuce, eggs, and onion to their deities, including Ra, Amun, Atum, and Ptah. These foods held symbolic meanings tied to fertility, renewal, and the hopefulness of spring.

Although the modern celebration no longer involves religious offerings, Egyptians continue the tradition of eating the same symbolic foods. A notable custom involves dyeing eggs in various colors, a practice believed to have originated with the ancient Egyptians. The strong-smelling fish, fesikh, in particular, has become an iconic, if controversial, element of the celebration.

The customs of Sham Ennessim are consistent throughout Egypt, though they tend to be preserved with greater fidelity in rural communities. A defining feature of the festival is the communal outing; Egyptians traditionally spend the day outdoors, picnicking in green spaces, public parks, along the banks of the Nile, or in local zoos. The outdoor gathering is central to the festival’s identity, symbolizing renewal and connection with nature.

While many of these customs persist in Egypt’s cities, ethnographic research in villages like Hesset-Melig has shown that rural areas maintain a more vivid and community-oriented expression of the festival. The blending of Islamic, Christian, and ancient Egyptian traditions is especially visible in these locales, where the communal spirit and ritualistic aspects of Sham Ennessim remain intact.

== Cross-religious observance ==
The Christian Egyptians have played a major role in preserving the festival through their cultural agency, which was quite limited after the conversion to Islam in Egypt, but that cannot be taken to be the reason why the Muslim Egyptians collectively celebrate the festival.

Fish and eggs are both symbols of resurrection for Christians, influencing their use in festivities.

Some scholars argue that the collective observance of the festival by Muslim Egyptians suggests its retention within Muslim communities themselves after their conversion to Islam, rather than merely being adopted from Coptic practices. This view is supported by the writings of E. W. Lane and by the continuity of shared celebratory customs.

In his work, Manners and Customs of the Modern Egyptians, E. W. Lane provides an early account of the festival’s observance:

"A custom termed 'Shemm en-Neseem' [sic.] (or the Smelling of the Zephyr) is observed on the first day of the Khamaseen. Early in the morning of this day, many persons, especially women, break an onion, and smell it; and in the course of the forenoon, many of the citizens of Cairo ride or walk a little way into the country, or go in boats, generally northwards, to take the air, or, as they term it, smell the air, which, on that day, they believe to have a wonderfully beneficial effect. The greater number dine in the country, or on the river. This year (1834), they were treated with a violent hot wind, accompanied by clouds of dust, instead of the neseem; but considerable numbers, notwithstanding, went out to 'smell' it."

Lane’s account appears to indicate that, historically, Muslim Egyptians may have determined the festival's timing independently of the Christian calendar, associating it instead with the first day of the Khamaseen season, a period of hot, dry winds. In the same volume, however, Lane notes: "they [the Muslims of Egypt] calculate the period of the 'Khamaseen,' when hot southerly winds are of frequent occurrence, to commence on the day immediately following the Coptic festival of Easter Sunday."

This statement seems to imply that, by the 19th century, the timing of the Khamaseen, at least popularly, had come to be reckoned in relation to the Coptic Easter. Nevertheless, this association raises chronological inconsistencies, as the Khamaseen season typically begins in late March, whereas Coptic Easter varies significantly and often falls well into April or even May. In the year 1834, for example, Coptic Easter occurred on May 5th, which does not align with the conventional beginning of the Khamaseen.

Lane also provides a list of Christian religious festivals observed by Coptic Christians following each fast, but Sham Ennesim is notably absent from this list, whereas Easter is explicitly mentioned. Sham Ennesim, instead, is described as a festival observed by Egyptians in general, without any explicit religious association.

== See also ==
- Shemu
- Nowruz
- Kha b-Nisan
- Holi
- Public holidays in Egypt
- Easter
