= Burong isda =

Filipino dish of pickled rice and fish

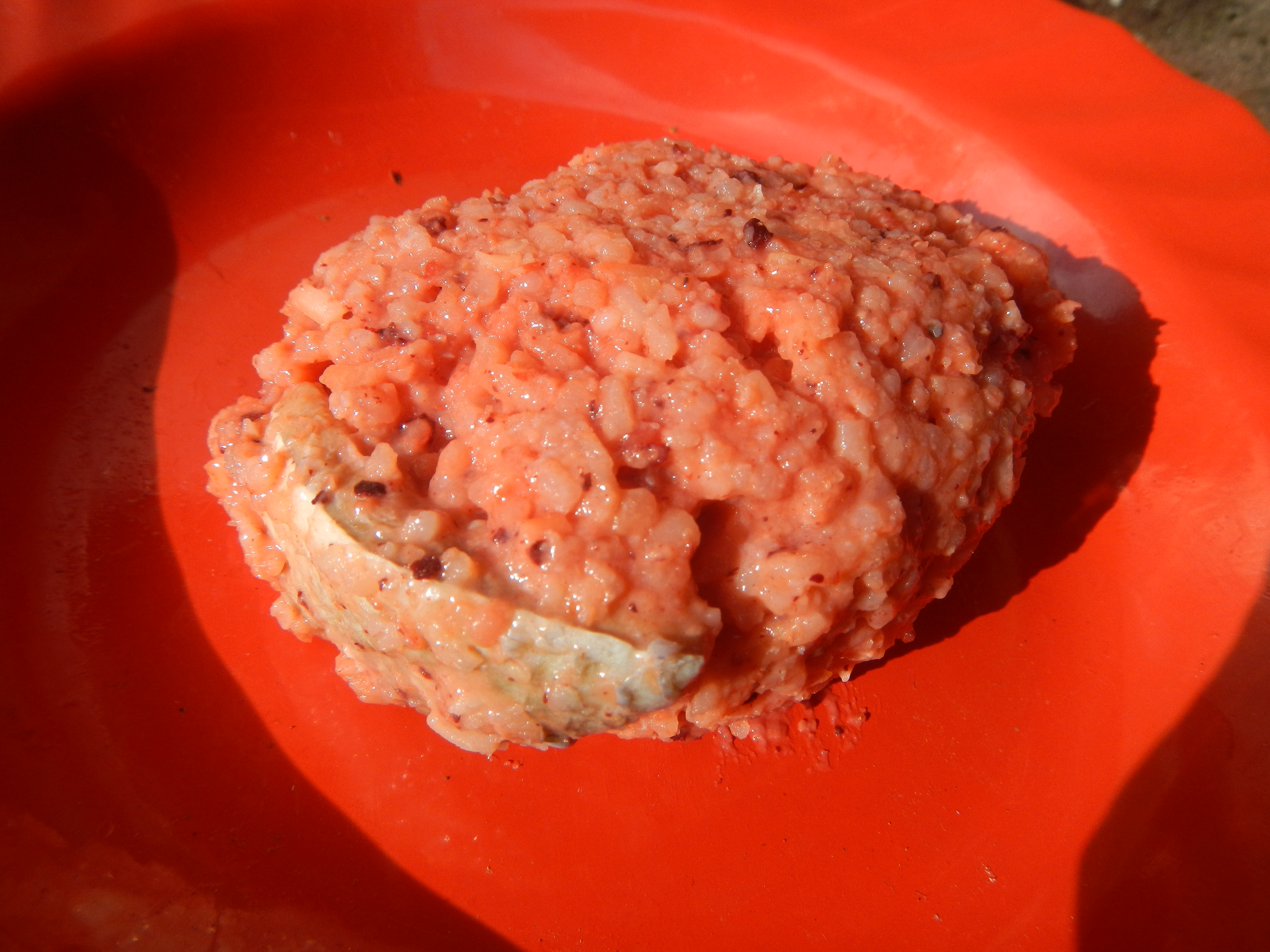
- Course: Main dish
- Place of origin: Philippines
- Region or state: Central Luzon
- Variations: burong dalag (snakehead); burong bangus (milkfish); burong hito (catfish); burong gurami (gourami), etc.
- Similar dishes: Tinapayan, Balao-balao, Narezushi, Pla ra

Burong isda (literally "fermented fish") is a Filipino dish consisting of cooked rice and raw filleted fish fermented with salt and angkak (red yeast rice) for around a week. The dish is common in Central Luzon, and is traditionally produced by the Sambal people, the Pangasinan people, the Ilocano people, the Kapampangan people, and the Tagalog people. Angkak may also be omitted, especially in western central Luzon, resulting in a white-colored version. Burong isda variants are usually named after the fish they were made with; e.g. burong bangus for burong isda made with bangus (milkfish). Shrimp versions of the dish are known as burong hipon or balao-balao. Burong isda is very similar to other fermented fish and rice dishes of Asia, including narezushi of Japanese cuisine and pla ra of Thai cuisine. All of these dishes rely on lactic acid fermentation to preserve the food.

== See also ==
- Binagoongan
- Daing
- Kinilaw
- Tapai
- Burong mangga
- Atchara
