= Dayok =

Philippine condiment

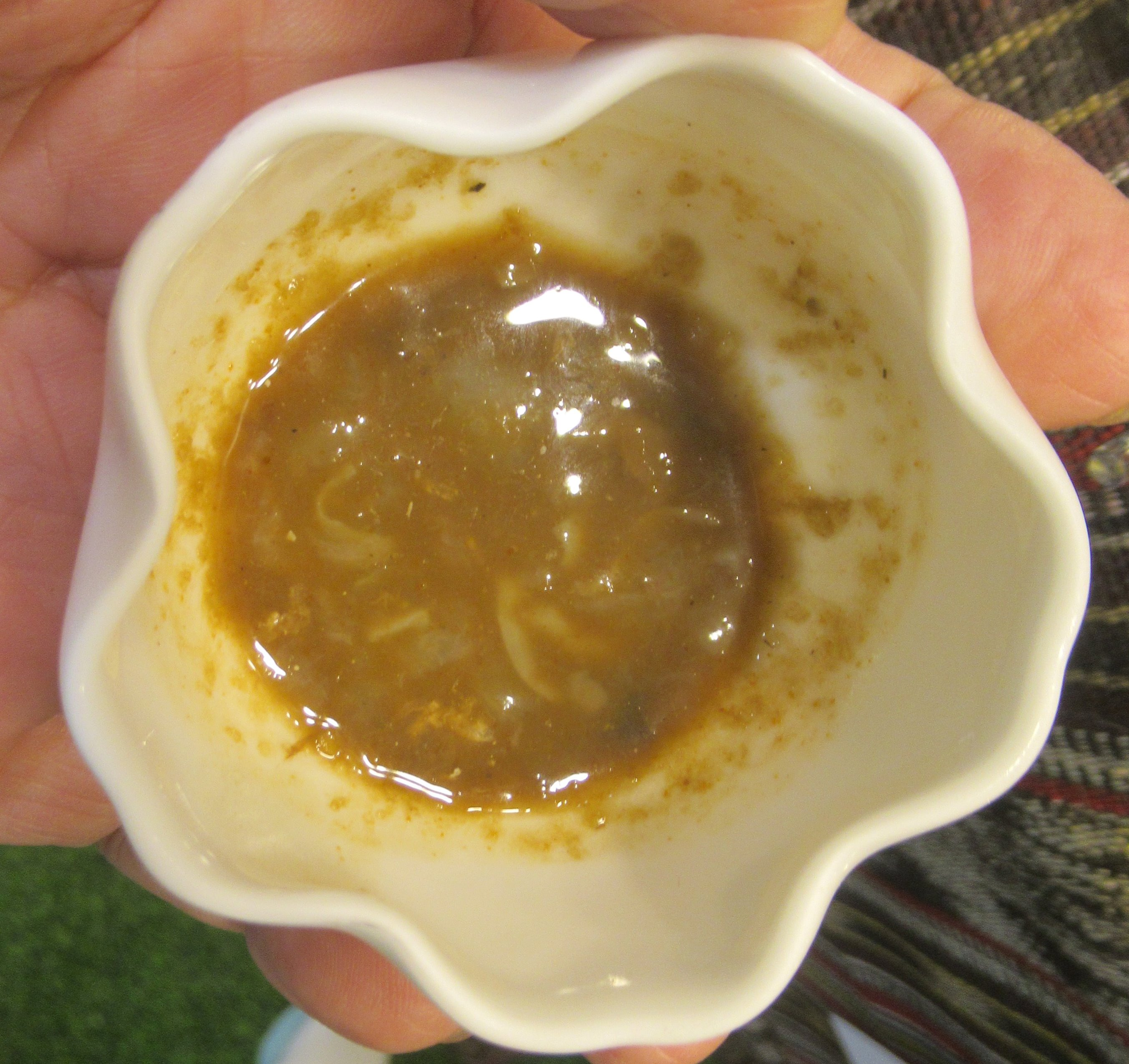
Dayok (Baganga)

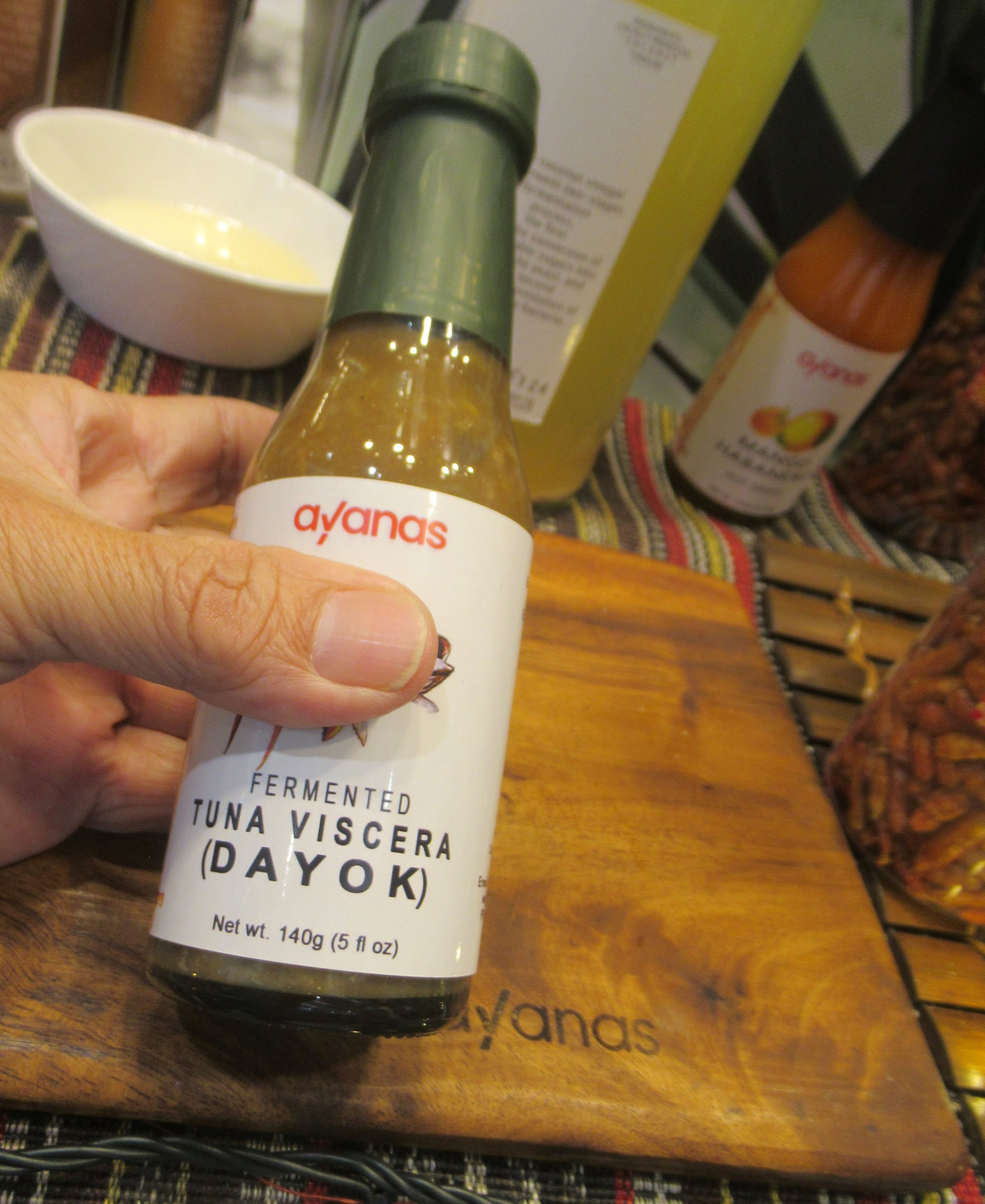
Ayana's Dayok

Dayok is a Philippine condiment originating from the islands of Visayas and Mindanao in the Philippines. It is made from fish entrails (usually from yellowfin tuna), excluding the heart and the bile sac. It is fermented with salt, and sometimes rice wine (pangasi) and various herbs. It has a sharp umami and salty flavor very similar to patis (fish sauce) and bagoong. It are sold in sealed glass bottles.

== See also ==
- Bekasang, a similar Indonesian preparation
- Shiokara, a similar Japanese preparation
- Bagoong
- Shrimp paste
- Fish sauce
