= Daing =

Dried fished from the Philippines

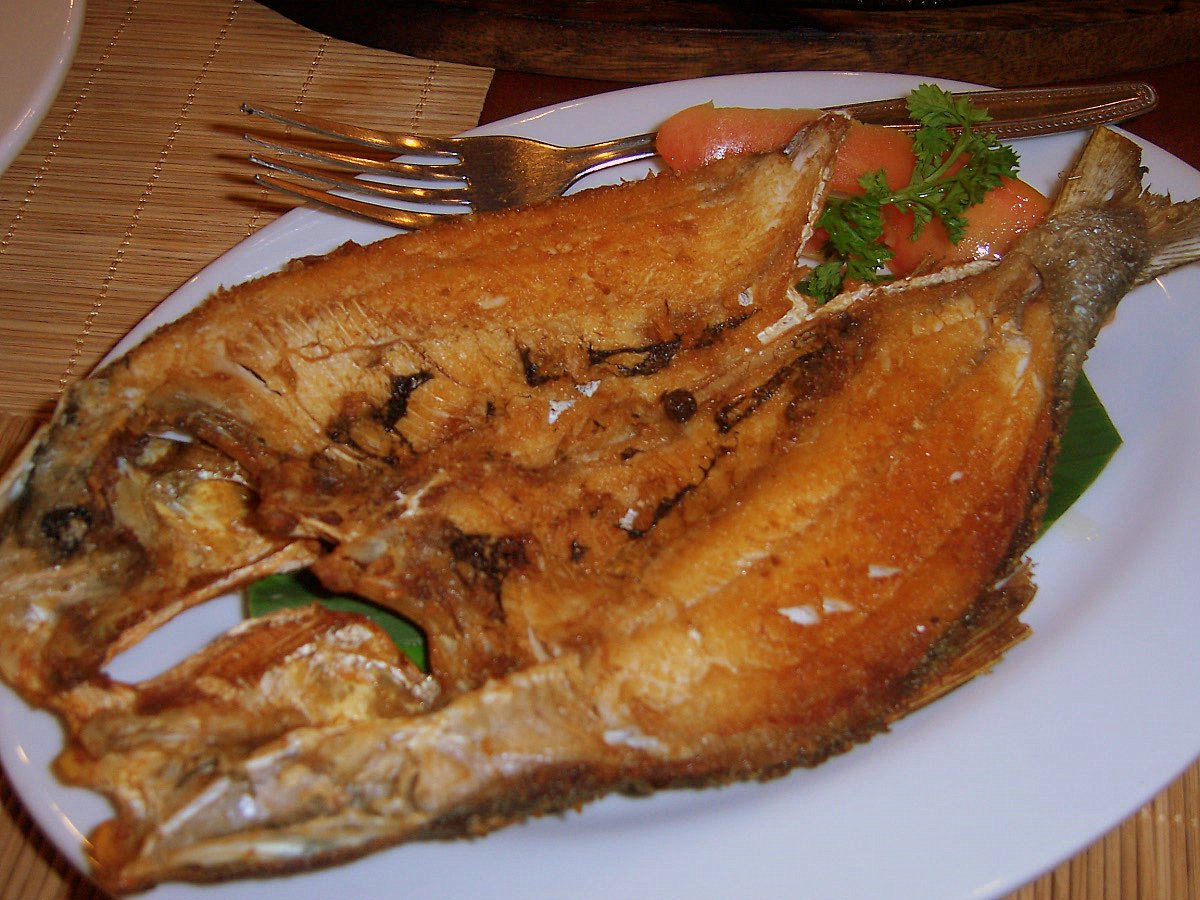
- Alternative names: Bilad, Tuyô, Pinikas, Buwad
- Place of origin: Philippines
- Variations: Labtingaw, lamayo

Daing, tuyô, buwad, or bilad (lit. 'sun-dried' or 'sun-baked') are dried fish from the Philippines. Fish prepared as daing are usually split open (though they may be left whole), gutted, salted liberally, and then sun and air-dried. There are also "boneless" versions which fillet the fish before the drying process. It was originally a preservation technique, as salt inhibits the growth of bacteria, allowing fish to be stored for long periods of time.

Daing is fried or grilled before consumption, though it can also be wrapped in foil and baked in an oven. It is usually dipped in vinegar and eaten with white rice for breakfast. Notably, it is traditionally paired with champorado (traditional Filipino chocolate rice gruel). It can also be used as an ingredient in other dishes.

Daing is considered peasant food because it is relatively cheap but has gained significance in Philippine culture as comfort food.

== Preparation ==
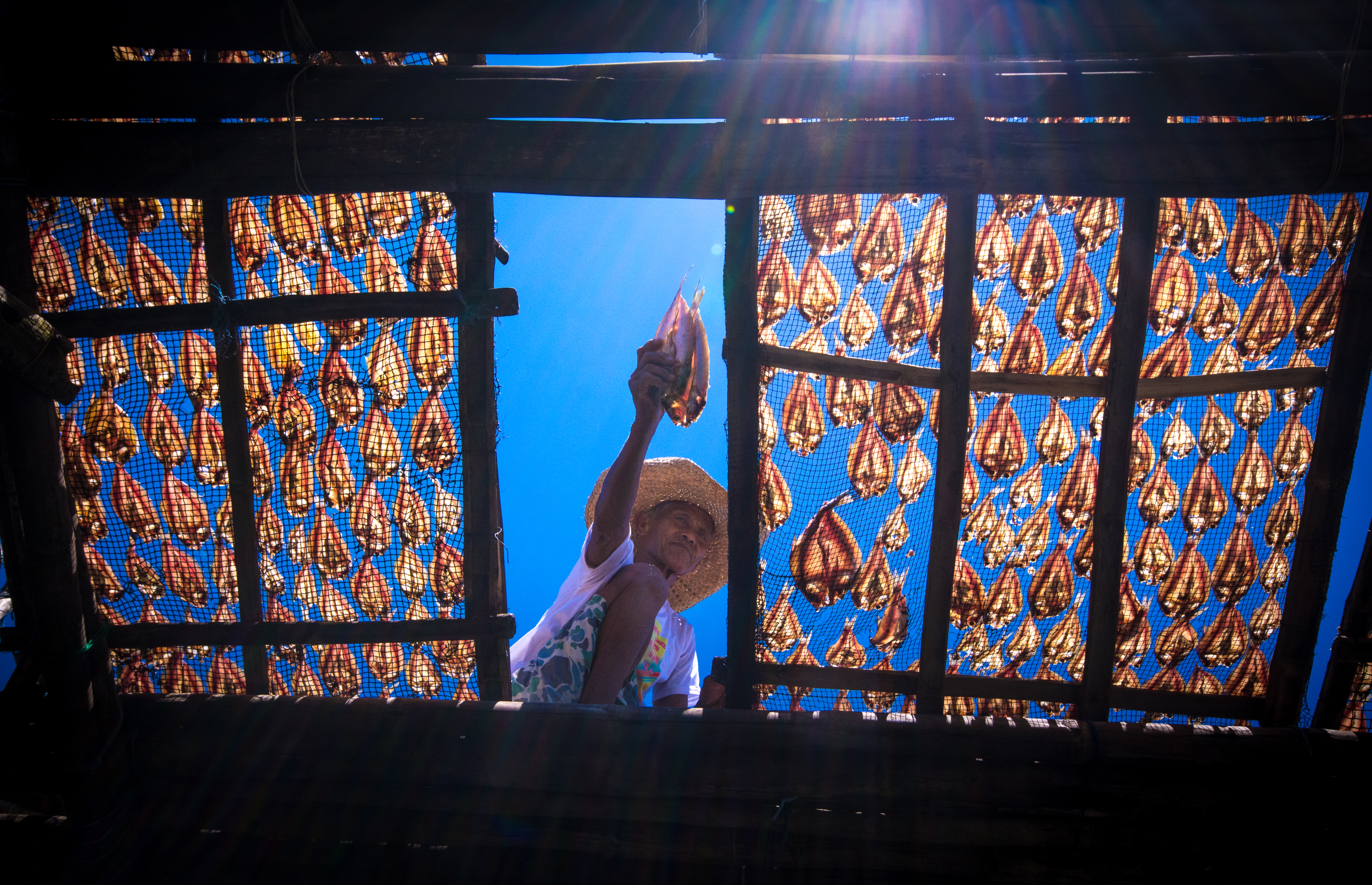
Daing being dried

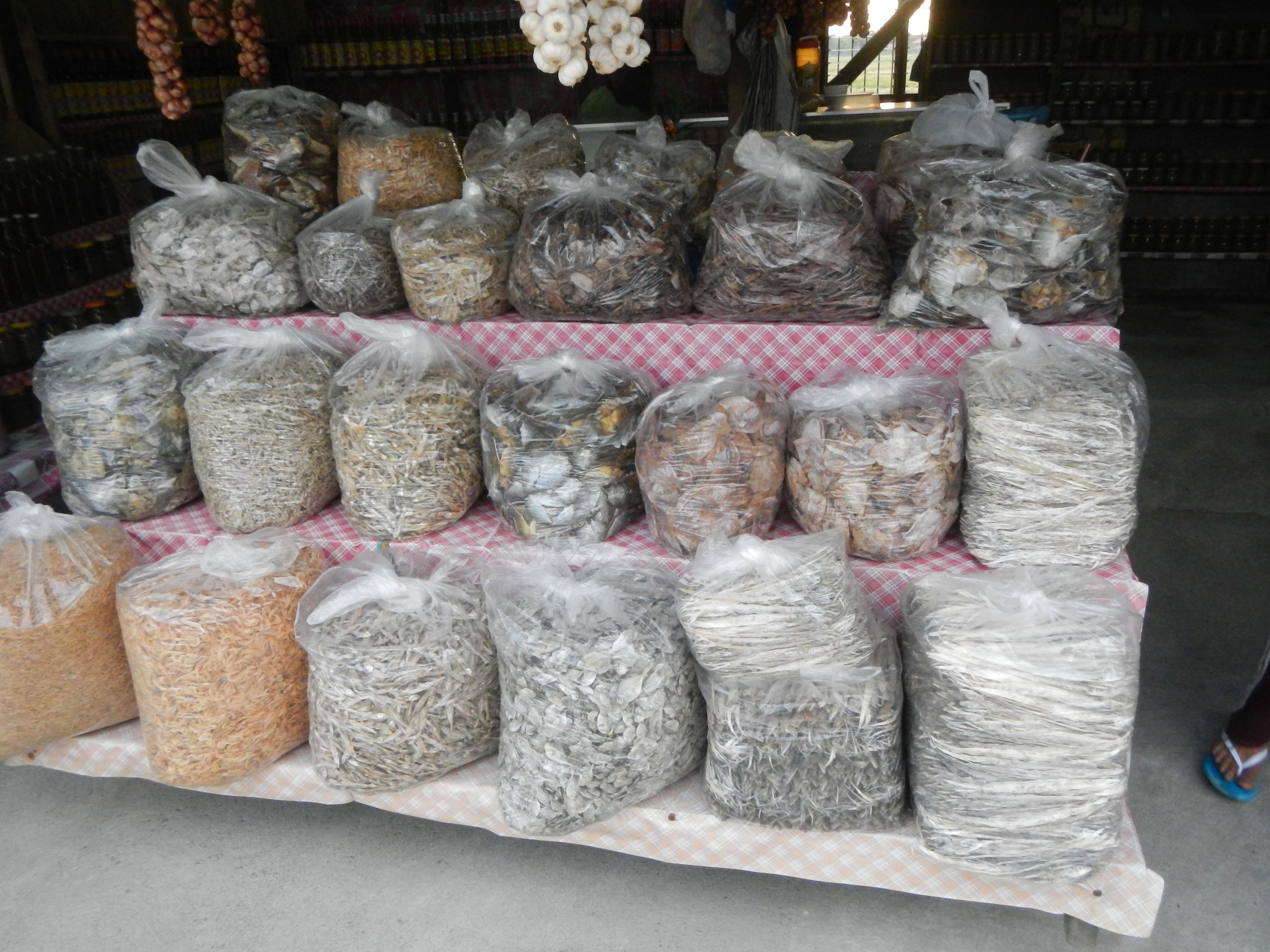
Various types of daing sold at a store in Pangasinan

Virtually any fish can be prepared as daing. The species of fish used is usually identified by name when sold in markets. For example, in Cebu, the local specialty which uses rabbitfish (Siganus spp., locally known as danggit), is called buwad danggit. Other fish species used include threadfin breams (Nemipteridae, locally known as bisugo); grey mullets (Mugilidae, locally known as banak); and sardines (Sardinella spp. and Dussumieria acuta, locally known as tunsoy or tamban). Daing made from sardines is usually dried whole, though exported daing may be gutted to comply with food laws in other countries. Cuttlefish and squid may also be prepared this way (Tagalog: daing na pusit; Cebuano: bulad pusit).

In Central and Southern Philippines, daing is known as bulad or buwad in Cebuano. The types of daing which use sliced and gutted fish are known as pinikas (literally "halved" referring to the halves of the fish). Northern regions usually do not distinguish between the two, though some may use daing to refer exclusively to the halved and gutted types, while tuyô is used for all types of daing.

== Variants ==
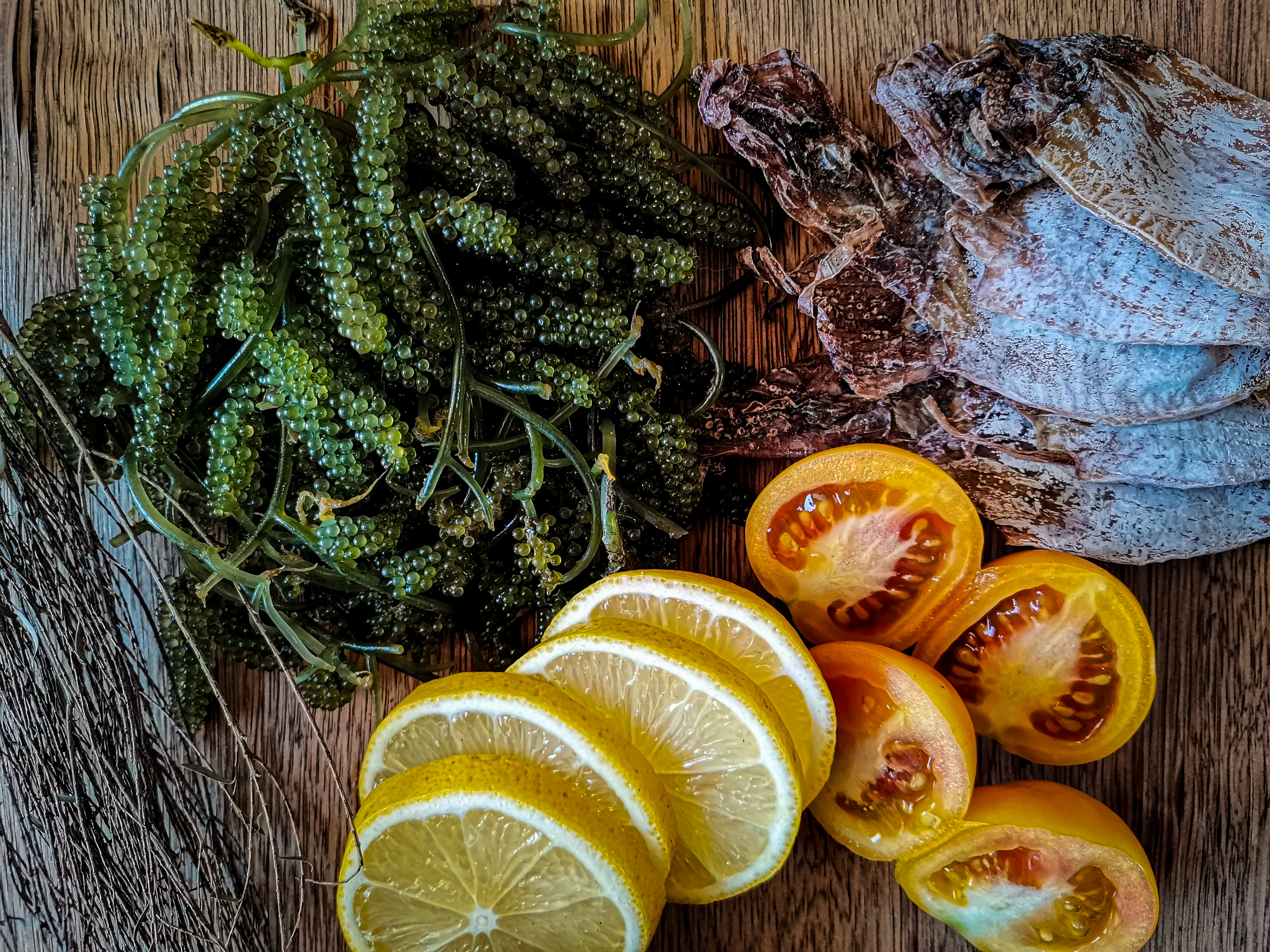
Daing na pusit (squid daing) with sea grapes

A variant of daing known as labtingaw uses less salt and is dried for a much shorter period (only a few hours). The resulting daing is still slightly moist and meatier than the fully dried variant. Another variant of daing known as lamayo, does away with the drying process altogether. Instead, after the fish is cleaned, it is simply marinated in vinegar, garlic, and other spices before frying.

== See also ==
- Tinapa
- Burong isda
- Clipfish
- Cuisine of the Philippines
- Kipper
- Stockfish
