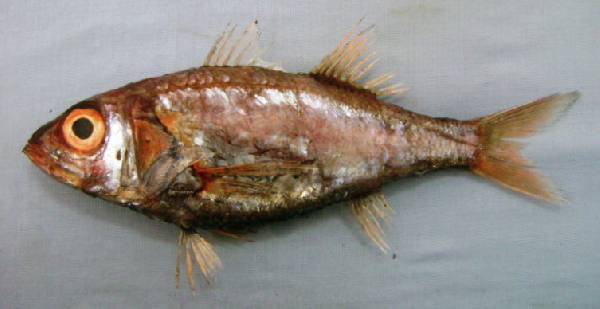

Scientific classification
- Kingdom: Animalia
- Phylum: Chordata
- Class: Actinopterygii
- Division: Teleostei
- Order: Acropomatiformes
- Family: Acropomatidae
- Genus: Acropoma
- Species: A. japonicum

Binomial name
- Acropoma japonicum Günther, 1859
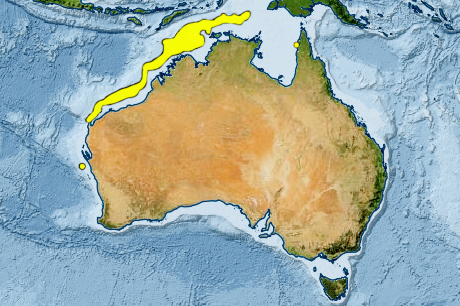

Synonyms
- Synagrops japonicus (Günther, 1859)

= Acropoma japonicum =

Species of fish

Acropoma japonicum, the glowbelly, is a fish species in the family Acropomatidae found in the Indo-West Pacific. It is a benthopelagic predatory fish with a bioluminescent organ on its ventral surface. The glowbelly is an important food fish in some areas.

== Description ==
Acropoma japonicum has a moderately elongated and compressed body with a covering of large scales which are deciduous. It has two light-producing organs, photophores in the abdominal muscle which run from the thorax to just past the anus, these are connected at the end nearest the fish's head. The dorsal fin of the glowbelly has 9 spines in its anterior portion with 10 soft rays behind them while the anal fin has 3 spines and 7 soft rays. This species attains a maximum total length of 20 centimetres (7.9 in).

== Distribution ==
Acropoma japonicum has a wide distribution in the Indo-Pacific region and it can be found from the eastern coast of Africa through the Indian Ocean and into the western Pacific Ocean as far north as Japan.

== Habitat and biology ==
Acropoma japonicum is a marine species with a depth range of 100–500 metres (330–1,640 ft) It inhabits sand and sandy mud bottoms. This is a predatory species in which the smaller individuals feed on copepods and caridean shrimp while the larger fish fed on those groups too but also preying on small fishes and krill. This species is unusual in having what appears to be a short life cycle for a predatory fish, the juvenile fish begin to settle at the end of the breeding season and are sexually mature by the start of the following breeding season. As the breeding season progresses the body condition of the males worsens and as a result they have a higher mortality than the females. Most fish do not survive beyond their first breeding season and females dominate older age classes. The older age classes may also migrate to deeper waters.

== Human usage ==
Acropoma japonicum is an important food fish which is a bycatch in Korean waters but in Japan it is used in the commercial manufacture of fishcakes. It is also used to make fishmeal. This species is also of ecological importance as it is an important constituent of the diet of many commercially important fish species.

== Taxonomy ==
Acropoma japonicum was first formally described in 1859 by the German born British zoologist Albert Günther (1830-1914) with the type locality being given as the "Japanese Sea". When Günther described it he placed it in a monotypic genus, Acropoma and so this species is the type species of that genus. A number of new species have been described in the 2000s in the genus Acropoma, for example the glowblellies around Australia have been named as Acropoma leobergi.
