= Atlantic rubyfish =

Conservation status
- Least Concern (IUCN 3.1)

Scientific classification
- Kingdom: Animalia
- Phylum: Chordata
- Class: Actinopterygii
- Order: Acanthuriformes
- Family: Emmelichthyidae
- Genus: Erythrocles
- Species: E. monodi

Binomial name
- Erythrocles monodi Poll & Cadenat, 1954

Species of fish

The Atlantic rubyfish (Erythrocles monodi), also known as the crimson rover, is a species of marine ray-finned fish belonging to the family Emmelichthyidae, the rovers, bonnetmouths and rubyfishes. This fish is found in the eastern and western central Atlantic Ocean.

== Taxonomy ==
The Atlantic rubyfish was first formally described in 1954 by the Belgian ichthyologist Max Poll and his French colleague Jean Cadenat with the type locality given as the Atlantic at 5°42'S, 11°31'E from a depth of 230–250 m (750–820 ft). The genus Erythrocles is classified in the family Emmelichtyidae in the order Acanthuriformes. The specific name honours Theodore Monod, an explorer and naturalist who was the founder and first director of the Institut Français d'Afrique Noire.

== Description ==
The Atlantic rubyfish has an oblong, compressed somewhat elongated body with its depth being roughly a quarter of its standard length. It has a large pointed head with a protrusible mouth with the maxilla being broadened and scaled and visible when the mouth is closed. The jaws have a small number of scattered, rather small conical teeth. The rear margin of the operculum has 2 or 3 flattened spines. The lower angle of the preoperculum is rounded and sticks out slightly to the rear as a thin plate and the preoperculum is smooth or has small serrations. The dorsal fin is deeply incised but is not separated into 2 fins and is supported by 11 spines and 11 or 12 soft rays. The anal fin is supported by 3 spines and 9 or 10 soft rays. In larger fish there is a fleshy keel on both sides of the caudal peduncle and the caudal fin has a deep fork. The head and body are covered in fine ctenoid scales and these extend onto the bases of the soft-rayed parts of the dorsal and anal fins and onto the last few rays of those fins. The head and body are silvery red, fading ventrally with reddish to pinkish white fins and a red iris. This species has reached a maximum published total length of 65 cm (26 in), although 40 cm (16 in) is more typical.

== Distribution and habitat ==
The Atlantic rubyfish is found in the eastern and western central Atlantic off the Americas and West Africa. In the Americas it is found from South Carolina in the United States south to the northwestern Bahamas and north central Cuba> Into the Gulf of Mexico where it occurs from offshore of northern Florida and Louisiana, south to the Caribbean Sea from Anguilla south to St. Lucia. In South America it extends along the northern coast from Cartagena, Colombia east to Caracas in Venezuela. In West Africa it is known from Mauritania south to Angola, as well as the Cape Verde Islands and São Tomé and Príncipe. in the Gulf of Guinea. This species is a neritic fish found at depths of 90 to 300 m (300 to 980 ft) with adults being found near the bottom over sand or mud substrates.

== Biology ==
Atlantic rubyfish form schools near to the bottom of the water column over soft substrates. They feed on larger zooplankton.

== Utilisation ==
The Atlantic rubyfish is not a target for fisheries in the Americas, although it may be taken as bycatch there, but is caught off Africa, as both a target for fisheries and bycatch, to be used for fish oil, fish meal and as food, sold fresh or frozen.
