= Redbait =

Redbait may refer to:

- The fish species Emmelichthys nitidus
- Pyura stolonifera, an ascidian often used as bait by anglers
- Red-baiting
