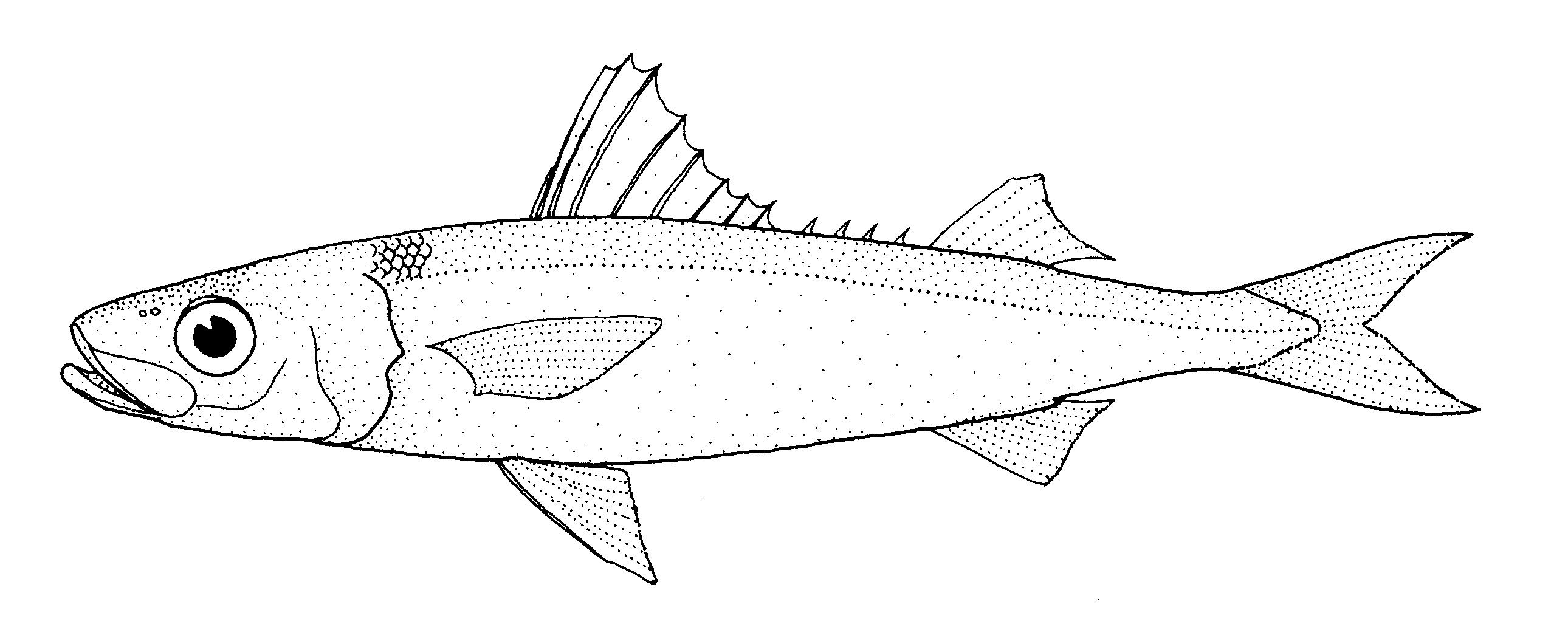
- Cape bonnetmouth (E. nitidus)

Scientific classification
- Kingdom: Animalia
- Phylum: Chordata
- Class: Actinopterygii
- Order: Acanthuriformes
- Family: Emmelichthyidae
- Genus: Emmelichthys; J. Richardson, 1845

Type species
- Emmelichthys nitidus J. Richardson, 1845

Synonyms
- Boxaodon Guichenot, 1848

= Emmelichthys =

Genus of fishes

Emmelichthys is a genus of marine ray-finned fishes belonging to the family Emmelichthyidae, the rovers and bonnetmouths. The species in this genus are found in the Atlantic, Indian and Pacific Oceans.

== Taxonomy ==
Emmelichthys was first proposed as a monospecific genus in 1845 by the Scottish naval surgeon, naturalist and Arctic explorer Sir John Richardson when he described Emmelichthys nitidus from Western Australia. The genus is classified in the small family Emmelichthyidae which is included in the order Acanthuriformes.

== Etymology ==
Emmelichthys prefices ichthys, meaning "fish" with emmeles, a word Richardson translated as "concinnus", that is something "skillfully put together", a reference to the "peculiarly neat aspect" of the E. nitidus.

== Species ==
There are seven species in the genus, including one newly described in 2024:

- Emmelichthys cyanescens Guichenot, 1848
- Emmelichthys elongatus Kotlyar, 1982
- Emmelichthys karnellai Heemstra & J. E. Randall, 1977 – Karnella's rover
- Emmelichthys nitidus J. Richardson, 1845 – Cape bonnetmouth
- Emmelichthys papillatus Girard, Santos, Bemis, 2024 – papillated redbait
- Emmelichthys ruber Trunov, 1976 – red rover
- Emmelichthys struhsakeri Heemstra & J. E. Randall, 1977 – golden redbait

== Characteristics ==
Emmelichthys fishes have slender cylindrical bodies, no deeper than 25% of their standard length. There is a clear gap between the spiny and soft rayed parts of the dorsal fin and the ultimate rays of both the dorsal and anal fins are markedly longer than the rays in front of them. The rear edge of the operculum has two or three flat spines and the preoperculum has smooth or weakly serrated edge. The largest species is E. nitidus with a maximum published total length of 55 cm (22 in).

== Distribution ==
Emmelichthys fishes are found largely in the Southern Hemisphere in the eastern, central and western Pacific, the Indian Ocean and the southeastern and western central Atlantic Ocean.
