= Plagiogeneion fiolenti =

Conservation status
- Data Deficient (IUCN 3.1)

Scientific classification
- Kingdom: Animalia
- Phylum: Chordata
- Class: Actinopterygii
- Order: Acanthuriformes
- Family: Emmelichthyidae
- Genus: Plagiogeneion
- Species: P. fiolenti

Binomial name
- Plagiogeneion fiolenti Parin, 1991

Species of ray-finned fish

Plagiogeneion fiolenti, the silver rover, is a species of marine ray-finned fish belonging to the family Emmelichthyidae, the rovers, bonnetmouths and rubyfishies. This species is endemic to the Walters Shoals in the southwestern Indian Ocean.
