= Acropoma profundum =

Scientific classification
- Kingdom: Animalia
- Phylum: Chordata
- Class: Actinopterygii
- Order: Acropomatiformes
- Family: Acropomatidae
- Genus: Acropoma
- Species: A. profundum

Binomial name
- Acropoma profundum Okamoto, 2014

Species of ray-finned fish

Acropoma profundum, Solomon's lanternbelly, is a species of ray-finned fish, a lanternbelly from the family Acropomatidae. It is found in the western South Pacific Ocean in waters near the Solomon Islands. The types were taken from depths of 1,169–1,203 metres (3,835–3,947 ft), making this the deepest living species of the genus Acropoma.
