= Acropoma splendens =

Scientific classification
- Domain: Eukaryota
- Kingdom: Animalia
- Phylum: Chordata
- Class: Actinopterygii
- Order: Acropomatiformes
- Family: Acropomatidae
- Genus: Acropoma
- Species: A. splendens

Binomial name
- Acropoma splendens (Lloyd, 1909)

Species of ray-finned fish

Acropoma splendens is a species of bioluminescent lanternbelly native to the eastern Indian Ocean. It was described from pair of specimens found in the Arafura Sea.

== Size ==
This species reaches a length of 4.1 cm (1.6 in).

== Etymology ==
The fish is named splendens which means bright and shiny.
