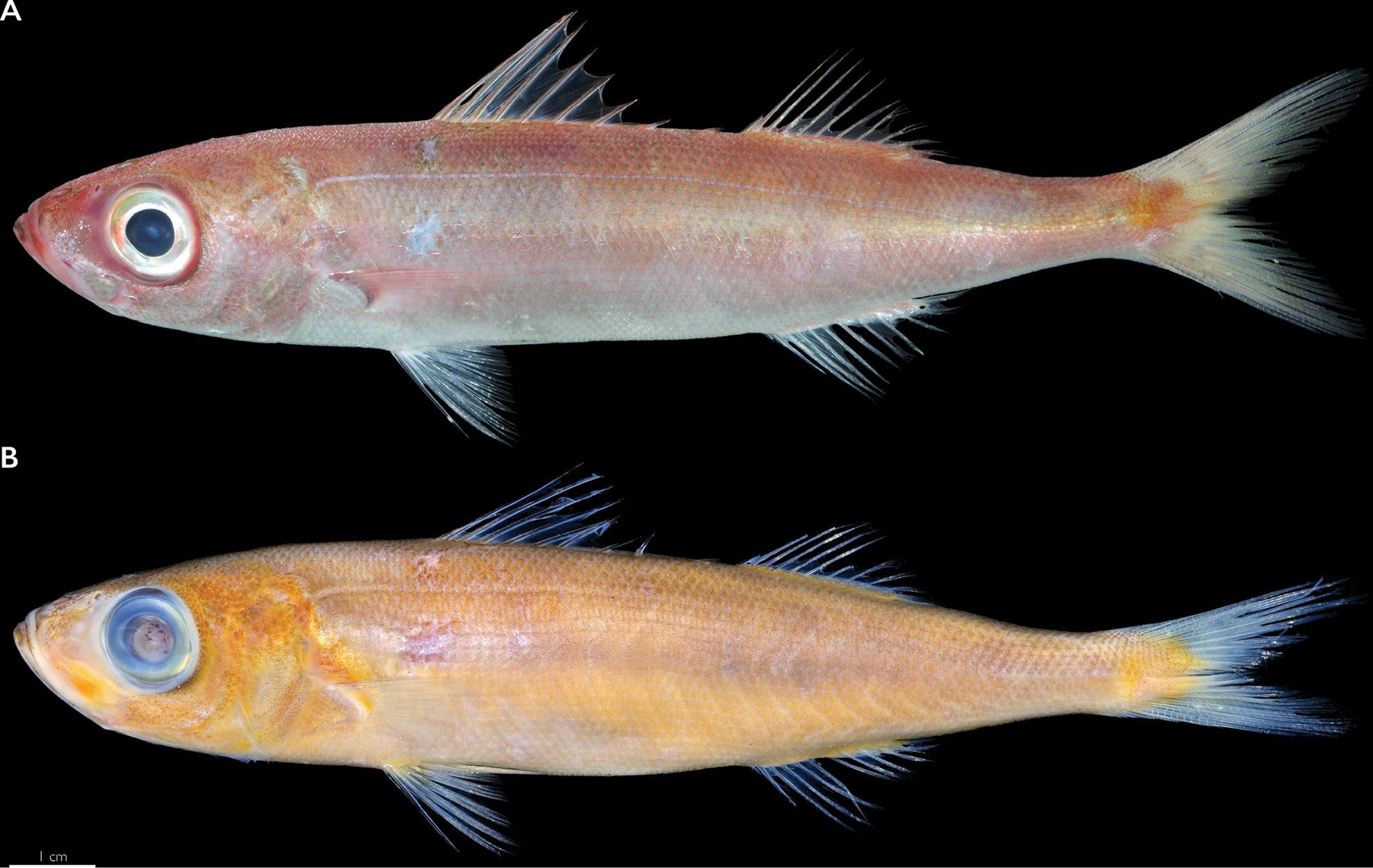
- Holotype of Emmelichthys papillatus

Scientific classification
- Kingdom: Animalia
- Phylum: Chordata
- Class: Actinopterygii
- Order: Acanthuriformes
- Family: Emmelichthyidae
- Genus: Emmelichthys
- Species: E. papillatus

Binomial name
- Emmelichthys papillatus M. Girard, Santos, Bemis, 2024

= Emmelichthys papillatus =

Papillated redbait

Species of fish

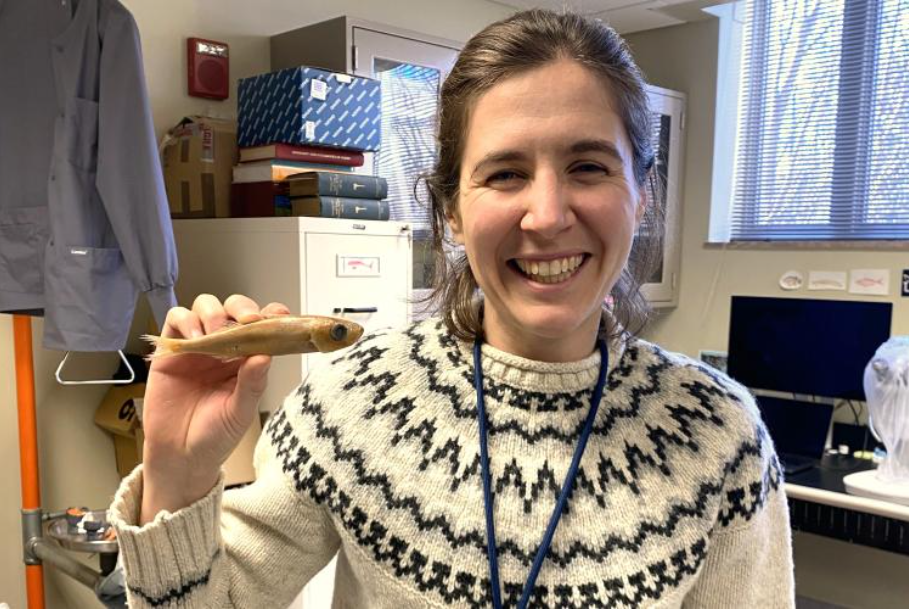
Dr. Katherine Bemis of the U.S. National Marine Fisheries Service's National Systematics Laboratory holds the holotype of the papillated redbait (Emmelichthys papillatus).

Emmelichthys papillatus (the papillated redbait) is a species of fish in the genus Emmelichthys. Specimens of the species were collected from fish markets on the islands of Panay and Cebu in the Visayas region of the Philippines, and it was first identified in March 2024.

== Description ==
Emmelichthys papillatus ranges from 5 to 6 inches (130 to 150 mm) in length and can be distinguished from similar fish by its dusky rose color. The fish is pink at the top and then fades to silver-pink, with some darker pink scales and bright red lips. It differs from other fish of the genus Emmelichthys in having two papillae (protrusions) from the bony area of the clavicle, and it has fewer fins and gill rakers than other fish of the genus Emmelichthys. Its DNA also differs from that of other fish of the genus.

== Discovery ==
During a routine trip to the Philippines to gather specimens, a team from the U.S. National Oceanic and Atmospheric Administration's (NOAA's) National Marine Fisheries Service (NMFS) collected two examples from a fish marker on Cebu of a fish initially identified as the golden redbait (Emmelichthys struhsakeri) and brought them back to the United States for examination by the NOAA National Systematics Laboratory at the Smithsonian Museum of Natural History in Washington, D.C.. Museum ichthyologist Dr. Michael Girard discovered that the specimens' genetic sequences did not match that of golden redbaits or any other species in the genetic library. Girard and the laboratory's research zoologist, Dr. Katherine Bemis, then examined other aspects of the specimens' biology and anatomy and found that the specimens also differed from golden redbaits in the number of gill rakers inside their mouths, their number of pectoral fins, and the presence of papillae on their pectoral girdles. These findings provided evidence that the two specimens belonged to a previously unknown species.

Girard and Bemis next sought matching specimens in natural history collections around the world and found a third specimen collected from a fish market on Panay in the Philippines by the Kagoshima University Museum in Japan. Although this specimen also had been misidentified as a golden redbait, Girard and Bemis studied its genetic data and anatomy and determined that it actually was a third specimen of the new species. This specimen ultimately became the holotype for the species, which became known as the papillated redbait (Emmelichthys papillatus). They published their discovery of the new species in March 2024.

== Names ==
The fish's English name, "papillated redbait," comes from its distinguishing feature, its two prominent fleshy papillae. Dr. Mudjekeewis “Mudjie” Santos of the Philippine National Fisheries Research and Development Institute, who was instrumental in the collection of specimens which provided fisheries data on the papillated redbait, coined its Tagalog name, rebentador pula, which can be translated as "red salesman" or "ruby salesman."

== Distribution and behavior ==
As of March 2024, it was not known if Emmelichthys papillatus occurs outside the waters of the Philippines, nor was its exact habitat known. Nothing was yet known about its reproduction or feeding behaviors.
