= Acropoma hanedai =

Scientific classification
- Kingdom: Animalia
- Phylum: Chordata
- Class: Actinopterygii
- Order: Acropomatiformes
- Family: Acropomatidae
- Genus: Acropoma
- Species: A. hanedai

Binomial name
- Acropoma hanedai Matsubara, 1953

Species of ray-finned fish

Acropoma hanedai is a species of ray-finned fish, a lanternbelly from the family Acropomatidae. It occurs in the north-western Pacific Ocean from southern Japan to Taiwan. It is a food fish which is caught by trawling.

== Size ==
This species reaches a length of 13.5 cm (5.3 in).

== Etymology ==
The fish is named in honor of Yata Haneda (1907-1995), who studied luminescent organisms, including the lanternbellies, and established the Haneda Luminous Pisces Collection at the Yokosuka City Museum in Japan.
