= Acropoma arafurensis =

Arafura lanternbelly

Scientific classification
- Domain: Eukaryota
- Kingdom: Animalia
- Phylum: Chordata
- Class: Actinopterygii
- Order: Acropomatiformes
- Family: Acropomatidae
- Genus: Acropoma
- Species: A. arafurensis

Binomial name
- Acropoma arafurensis Okamoto, J.T. Williams, K.E. Carpenter, M. D. Santos & Seishi Kimura, 2019
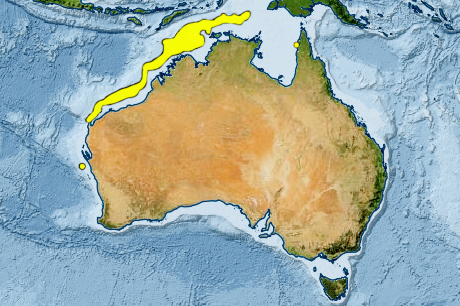
- Map range of Acropoma arafurensis

Species of ray-finned fish

Acropoma arafurensis, commonly known as the Arafura lanternbelly, is a species of bioluminescent lanternbelly native to the Western Pacific Ocean. It was described from pair of specimens found in the Arafura Sea. The known specimens measure between 57.3–76.2 mm (2.26–3.00 in) in length.

== Size ==
This species reaches a length of 7.6 cm (3.0 in).
