= Acropoma musorstom =

Scientific classification
- Domain: Eukaryota
- Kingdom: Animalia
- Phylum: Chordata
- Class: Actinopterygii
- Order: Acropomatiformes
- Family: Acropomatidae
- Genus: Acropoma
- Species: A. musorstom

Binomial name
- Acropoma musorstom Okamoto, J. E. Randall, Motomura, 2021

Species of ray-finned fish

Acropoma musorstom is a species of bioluminescent lanternbelly found in Vanuatu.

== Size ==
This species reaches a length of 14.3 cm (5.6 in).

== Etymology ==
The fish is named for the acronym MUSORSTOM, for a series of exploratory cruises to the waters of Vanuatu, during which the holotype was collected
