= Acropoma heemstrai =

Scientific classification
- Kingdom: Animalia
- Phylum: Chordata
- Class: Actinopterygii
- Order: Acropomatiformes
- Family: Acropomatidae
- Genus: Acropoma
- Species: A. heemstrai

Binomial name
- Acropoma heemstrai Okamoto and Golani, 2017

Species of ray-finned fish

Acropoma heemstrai is a species of ray-finned fish in the genus Acropoma. A small sample was found in South Africa and Mozambique.

== Description ==
They measure between 53.1–121 mm (2.09–4.76 in). Its set apart from others due to its luminous gland being shaped like a Y and a distinctive lower jaw that appears somewhat pointed. This species reaches a length of 12.1 cm (4.8 in).

== Distribution & Habitat ==
Acropoma heemstrai is mostly found in the Western Indian Ocean, particularly off the coasts of South Africa (Eastern Cape, KwaZulu-Natal), Southern Mozambique and eastward to Madagascar. It is a marine, bathypelagic species that occurs in the western Indian Ocean. It inhabits in depths between 60 and 300 m.

== Etymology ==
The fish is named in honor of ichthyologist Phil Heemstra (1941–2019), of the South African Institute for Aquatic Biodiversity, because of his contributions to the studiy of percoid fshes from the western Indian Ocean.
