= Acropoma lecorneti =

Scientific classification
- Kingdom: Animalia
- Phylum: Chordata
- Class: Actinopterygii
- Order: Acropomatiformes
- Family: Acropomatidae
- Genus: Acropoma
- Species: A. lecorneti

Binomial name
- Acropoma lecorneti Fourmanoir, 1988

Species of ray-finned fish

Acropoma lecorneti is a species of ray-finned fish, a lanternbelly from the family Acropomatidae. It is found in the western Pacific Ocean where it has been recorded off Japan and New Caledonia. This species was first formally described by the French ichthyologist Pierre Fourmanoir (1924-2007) with the type locality given as north of the St Vincent Pass off the western coast of New Caledonia at a depth of 360 metres (1,180 ft). The specific name honours the skipper of the fishing boat Thalassa, Monsieur Lecornet, who took the type aboard that vessel.

== Size ==
This species reaches a length of 35.0 cm (13.8 in).

== Etymology ==
The fish is named in honor of D. Lecornet of Nouméa, New Caledonia, a fisherman and owner of the boat from which the type specimen was collected.

== Additional reading ==
- Yamanoue, Yusuke and Minoru Toda. “Redescription of Acropoma lecorneti Fourmanoir 1988 (Perciformes: Acropomatidae) with the first record from the North Pacific.” Ichthyological Research 55 (2008): 198-201.
