= Lev Berg =

Russian and Soviet scientist

- Лев Берг
- Berg in 1920
- Born: Lev Semyonovich Berg; 14 March 1876; Bender, Bessarabia, Russian Empire
- Died: 24 December 1950 (aged 74); Leningrad, Russian SFSR, Soviet Union
- Scientific career
- Fields: Geographer and biologist

Lev Semyonovich Berg, also known as Leo S. Berg (Russian: Лев Семёнович Берг; 14 March 1876 – 24 December 1950) was a leading Russian geographer, biologist and ichthyologist who served as President of the Soviet Geographical Society between 1940 and 1950.

He is known for his own evolutionary theory, nomogenesis (a form of orthogenesis incorporating mutationism) as opposed to the theories of Darwin and Lamarck.

== Life ==
Lev Berg was born in Bessarabia in a Jewish family, the son of Simon Gregoryevich Berg, a notary, and Klara Lvovna Bernstein-Kogan. He graduated from the Second Kishinev Gymnasium in 1894. Like some of his relatives, Berg converted to Christianity in order to pursue his studies at Moscow State University.

At Moscow University, Berg studied hydrobiology and geography. He later studied ichthyology and in 1928 was awarded he was also a member of the Russian Academy of Sciences.

Lev Berg graduated from the Moscow State University in 1898. Between 1903 and 1914, he worked in the Museum of Zoology in Saint Petersburg. He was one of the founders of the Geographical Institute, now a Faculty of Geography of the Saint Petersburg State University.

Berg studied and determined the depth of the lakes of Central Asia, including Balkhash and Issyk-Kul. He developed Dokuchaev's doctrine of natural zones, which became one of the foundations of the Soviet biology. Among his pioneering monographs on climatology were "Climate and Life" (1922) and "Foundations of Climatology" (1927).

During his lifetime, Berg was a towering presence in the science of ichthyology. In 1916, he published four volumes of the study of Fishes of Russia. The fourth edition was issued in 1949 as Freshwater Fishes of the Soviet Union and Adjacent Countries and won him the Stalin Prize. He was said to have discovered the symbiotic relationship between lampreys and salmon. Berg's name is featured in the Latin appellations of more than 60 species of plants and animals.

He spent the last two years of his life living in Komarovo.

He died on 24 December 1950 in Leningrad. He was buried on the Volkovo Cemetery.

In 2001, the Central Bank of Transnistria minted a silver coin honoring this native of today's Transnistria, as part of a series of commemorative coins called The Outstanding People of Pridnestrovie.

== Nomogenesis ==
Berg is best known for his evolutionary theory called nomogenesis, which was a type of orthogenesis or mutationism. Berg's ideas were collected in his book Nomogenesis; or, Evolution Determined by Law and was first published in 1922 in Russia; it was later translated into English in two editions the first appearing in 1926 and the later edition appearing in 1969. In the book Berg collected a large amount of empirical data which offered a strong criticism of Darwin's theory of evolution.

Berg's theory of nomogenesis combined arguments from paleontology, zoology and botany to claim that evolution is not a random process. The theory emphasized the limitations of natural selection which determine the directionality of evolution.

Berg claimed that the variation of characters in species is confined within certain limits due to both internal and external factors. The limitation of the variability, Berg argued, left hardly any space for natural selection; he claimed this was supported by the paleontological record because all the phylogenetic branches look more or less like straight lines. Berg distanced himself from both Darwinism and Lamarckism. Instead he proposed the mutationist concept of directed mass mutations as the main mechanism for directing evolution.

Influenced by the paleontologist Wilhelm Waagen, he labeled the directed mutations Waagen-Mutations:

"New species arise by means of mass transformation of a great number of individuals, which happens due to Waagen mutations... This mass transformation is a phenomenon of geological magnitude. It is connected with the alteration of the fauna of a certain horizon and comes about in certain periods only to be absent for a long time"

Thus Berg claimed evolution was caused by mass mutations, which are directed by internal and external factors, so that new species occur with a high probability of being almost perfectly adapted. According to Berg, newly evolved species beget the subordinate taxonomic categories, and appear to be perfectly adapted to their environments. Although Berg's theory was anti-Darwinian, and anti-Lamarckian, it still advocated adaptive evolution.

J. B. S. Haldane called Nomogenesis "by far the best anti-Darwinian book of this century".

== Personal life ==
In 1910, Berg married fellow Bendery native Polina Abramovna Kotlovker. They separated shortly after the birth of their second child and though Polina sued, the Russian Orthodox Church granted custody to her Christian husband. Berg's mother helped raise the children, Simon (born 1911) and Raissa (born 1913). Berg married Maria Mikhailovna Ivanova, the daughter of a ship's commander, in 1923.

== Honours ==
Berg on a 2026 postcard of Russia

Berg was honored for a lifetime of scientific achievement by the Imperial Russian Geographical Society and presented with the P. P. Semyonov-Tyan-Shansky Gold Medal.

The Berg Mountains in Antarctica, Cape Berg in Severnaya Zemlya and Cape Berg in Zemlya Georga were named after him.

The research ship Lev Berg, named after him, currently rests on the dried bottom of the Aral Sea. In 1971, it was involved in the Aral smallpox incident.

== Taxon named in his honor ==
- Bathyraja bergi, the bottom skate, is a species of skate in the family Arhynchobatidae found in the north-western Pacific Ocean.
- Leobergia, an extinct fossil relative of the pikeperch from the late Neogene of eastern Europe

== Works ==
- Nomogenesis; or, Evolution Determined by Law (1922)
- "Fresh-water fishes of Russia" (1923)
- Discovery of Kamchatka and Bering's Kamchatka Voyages (1924)
- Russian discoveries in the Pacific (1926)
- "Principles of climatology" (1927) (reprinted 1938)
- Geographical zones of the U.S.S.R. (1937)
- "Freshwater fishes of the U.S.S.R. and adjacent countries. Volume 1–3. Israel Program for Scientific Translations Ltd, Jerusalem. 1962–65 (Russian version published 1948–49)."
- "Natural regions of the U.S.S.R." (1950)
- "Classification of fishes, both recent and fossil" (1940)
- Loess as a product of weathering and soil formation

== Taxa described by him ==
- See Category:Taxa named by Lev Berg

== Eponymous taxa ==
- The Tropical lanternbelly, Acropoma leobergi is a species of the genus Acropoma described as having a luminous behind the anus that resembles a "U" in shape. The species is native to the Arafura Sea.
- The Bottom skate, Bathyraja bergi Dolganov, 1983, is a species of skate in the family Arhynchobatidae found in the Northwest Pacific Ocean.

== See also ==
- Orthogenesis
- Lysenkoism
- The eclipse of Darwinism
