= Acropoma boholensis =

Conservation status
- Data Deficient (IUCN 3.1)

Scientific classification
- Kingdom: Animalia
- Phylum: Chordata
- Class: Actinopterygii
- Order: Acropomatiformes
- Family: Acropomatidae
- Genus: Acropoma
- Species: A. boholensis

Binomial name
- Acropoma boholensis Yamanaoue & Mastuura, 2002

Species of ray-finned fish

Acropoma boholensis is a species of ray-finned fish, a lanternbelly from the family Acropomatidae which is found in the western Pacific Ocean around the Philippines.

== Size ==
This species reaches a length of 13.2 cm (5.2 in).
