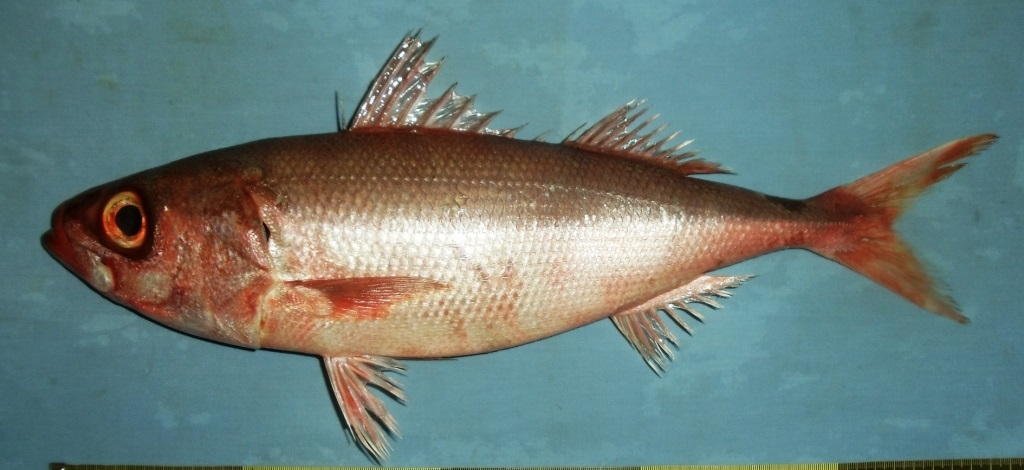

Conservation status
- Least Concern (IUCN 3.1)

Scientific classification
- Kingdom: Animalia
- Phylum: Chordata
- Class: Actinopterygii
- Order: Acanthuriformes
- Family: Emmelichthyidae
- Genus: Erythrocles
- Species: E. schlegelii

Binomial name
- Erythrocles schlegelii (Richardson, 1846)

Synonyms
- Emmelichthys schlegelii Richardson, 1846; Erythrichthys schlegelii Günther, 1859

= Japanese rubyfish =

Species of fish

The Japanese rubyfish (Erythrocles schlegelii) also known as the Pacific rover or dusky rover, is a species of marine ray-finned fish belonging to the family Emmelichthyidae, the rovers, bonnetmouths and rubyfishes. This fish is found in the Indian and western Pacific Oceans.

== Taxonomy ==
The Japanese rubyfish was first formally described as Emmelichthys schlegelii by the Scottish naval surgeon, naturalist and Arctic explorer Sir John Richardson with its type locality given as Nagasaki. Richardson based his description on an illustration of a fish in part7-9 of their volume on Pisces of the Fauna Japonica by Coenraad Jacob Temminck and Hermann Schlegel which they called Erythrichthys but did not give a specific name to, Richardson named it in Schlegel's honour. In 1859 Albert Günther also gave the name Erythrichthys schlegelii to the illustration by Temminck and Schlegel with its type locality as the Sea of Japan, without citing Richardson, 1846, in his Catalogue of the fishes in the British Museum. In 1919 David Starr Jordan replaced the generic name Erythrichthys with Erythrocles as Erythrichthys was preoccupied by Erythrichthys Bonaparte, 1831. This species is the type species of the genus Erythrocles. The genus Erythrocles is classified in the family Emmelichtyidae in the order Acanthuriformes.

== Description ==
The Japanese rubyfish has an oblong body that has a depth of one-fifth to one-third of its standard length and which is less than the length of the head. The dorsal fin is incised to its base immediately before the last dorsal fin spine. The first dorsal fin contains 10 spines with the second dorsal fin having a single spine and between 10 and 12 soft rays. The anal fin has 3 spines and 9 or 10 soft rays. The caudal peduncle has a low, fleshy ridge on each side. The front of the lower jaw typically has a row of tiny teeth. They are bluish grey on the upper body, silvery white with pinkish hue ventrally with reddish orange caudal and pectoral fins. This species has reached a maximum published total length of 72 cm (28 in).

== Distribution and habitat ==
The Japanese rubyfish has an Indo-West Pacific distribution. It is found in eastern Africa where it has been recorded from South Africa, Madagascar and Kenya east as far as Hawaii, north to southern Japan and south to Australia. In Australia it occurs from Rottnest Island in Western Australia around the northern tropical coast as far as Moreton Bay in Queensland and Lord Howe Island. This is a demersal fish found in deep waters at depths of 215 to 300 m (705 to 984 ft).

== Biology ==
The Japanese rubyfish has been reported to feed mainly on shrimps in the family Sergestidae, as well as on small mesopelagic lanternfishes, snaggletooths and barracudinas. Off the Philippines, in the photic zone. the larvae and juvenlies of this species have been photographed in close association with the pelagic salp Pegea confoederata. These young fishes either drift beside a colony of salps or live within the cavities of individual members of the colony.
