= Acropoma argentistigma =

Scientific classification
- Kingdom: Animalia
- Phylum: Chordata
- Class: Actinopterygii
- Order: Acropomatiformes
- Family: Acropomatidae
- Genus: Acropoma
- Species: A. argentistigma

Binomial name
- Acropoma argentistigma Okamoto & H. Ida, 2002

Species of ray-finned fish

Acropoma argentistigma is a species of ray-finned fish, a lanternbelly from the family Acropomatidae. It is found in the Indian Ocean off the coast of Thailand. It is caught in local fisheries and reaches a maximum standard length of 10.4 centimetres (4.1 in). This species was formally described in 2002 by Makoto Okamoto and Hitoshi Ida from types collected at the Phuket fish market. In 2012 a specimen was taken off the east coast of India in the Bay of Bengal.
