= Emmelichthys cyanescens =

Scientific classification
- Kingdom: Animalia
- Phylum: Chordata
- Class: Actinopterygii
- Order: Acanthuriformes
- Family: Emmelichthyidae
- Genus: Emmelichthys
- Species: E. cyanescens

Binomial name
- Emmelichthys cyanescens (Guichenot, 1848)

Synonyms
- Boxaodon cyanescens Guichenot, 1848; Emmelichthys nitidus cyanescens (Guichenot, 1848); Erythrichthys cyanescens (Guichenot, 1848)

Species of ray-finned fish

Emmelichthys cyanescens is a species of marine ray-finned fish belonging to the family Emmelichthyidae, the rovers and bonnetmouths. This fish is found in the deep waters of the eastern Pacific Ocean off the coast of Chile and the Juan Fernández Islands. This species can reach a standard length of 34.2 cm (13.5 in). Until 2014 this taxon was regarded as a subspecies of Emmelichthys nitidus.
