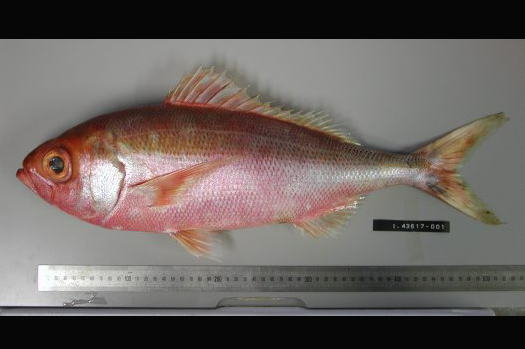
- Rubyfish (Plagiogeneion rubiginosum) from the Sydney Fish Market.

Scientific classification
- Kingdom: Animalia
- Phylum: Chordata
- Class: Actinopterygii
- Order: Acanthuriformes
- Family: Emmelichthyidae
- Genus: Plagiogeneion; H. O. Forbes, 1890

Type species
- Therapon rubiginosus F. W. Hutton, 1875

= Plagiogeneion =

Genus of fishes

Plagiogeneion i is a genus of marine ray-finned fishes belonging to the family Emmelichthyidae, the rovers, bonnetmouths or rubyfishes. The fishes in this genus are found in the southeastern Atlantic, Indian, and Pacific Oceans.

== Taxonomy ==
Plagiogeneion was first proposed as a monospecific genus in 1890 by the Scottish explorer, ornithologist, and botanist Henry Ogg Forbes with Therapon rubiginosus, which had been described in 1875 by Frederick W. Hutton from New Zealand, as its only species. The genus is classified in the small family Emmelichthyidae which is included in the order Acanthuriformes.

== Etymology ==
Plagiogeneion is a compound of plagios, meaning "perpendicular", and geneion, which means "jawed", an allusion to the almost vertical mouth of the type species, P. rubiginosum.

== Species ==
There are currently five recognized species in this genus:

- Plagiogeneion fiolenti Parin, 1991
- Plagiogeneion geminatum Parin, 1991
- Plagiogeneion macrolepis McCulloch, 1914 – bigscale rubyfish
- Plagiogeneion rubiginosum (F. W. Hutton, 1875) – rubyfish
- Plagiogeneion unispina Parin, 1991

== Characteristics ==
Plagiogeneion rubyfishes have a body which has a standard length of 2.8 to 3.6 times its depth. They have a continuous dorsal fin which is only slightluy incised at the front of the soft-rayed portion of the fin. The final spines of both the dorsal and anal fins are not longer than the penultimate spines. They lack a fleshy ridge on the side of the caudal peduncle and do not have a groove or fleshy protuberance on rear margin of the gill cavity. The upper spine on operculum is an obtuse flat point or developed as an acute spine. They have a small number of small sharp teeth at the front of the jaws and they may have similar teeth on the vomer and palatines. The rubyfish (P. rubiginosum) is the largest species, attaining a maximum published total length of 60 cm (24 in), while the smallest is P. unispina at a maximum published standard length of 23.9 cm (9.4 in).
