= Bathyraja bergi =

Bottom skate

Conservation status
- Least Concern (IUCN 3.1)

Scientific classification
- Kingdom: Animalia
- Phylum: Chordata
- Class: Chondrichthyes
- Subclass: Elasmobranchii
- Order: Rajiformes
- Family: Arhynchobatidae
- Genus: Bathyraja
- Species: B. bergi

Binomial name
- Bathyraja bergi Dolganov, 1983

Species of fish

Bathyraja bergi, the bottom skate, is a species of skate in the family Arhynchobatidae found in the north-western Pacific Ocean.

== Etymology ==
The fish is named in honor of ichthyologist Lev (also Leo) Semyonovich Berg (1876–1950).
