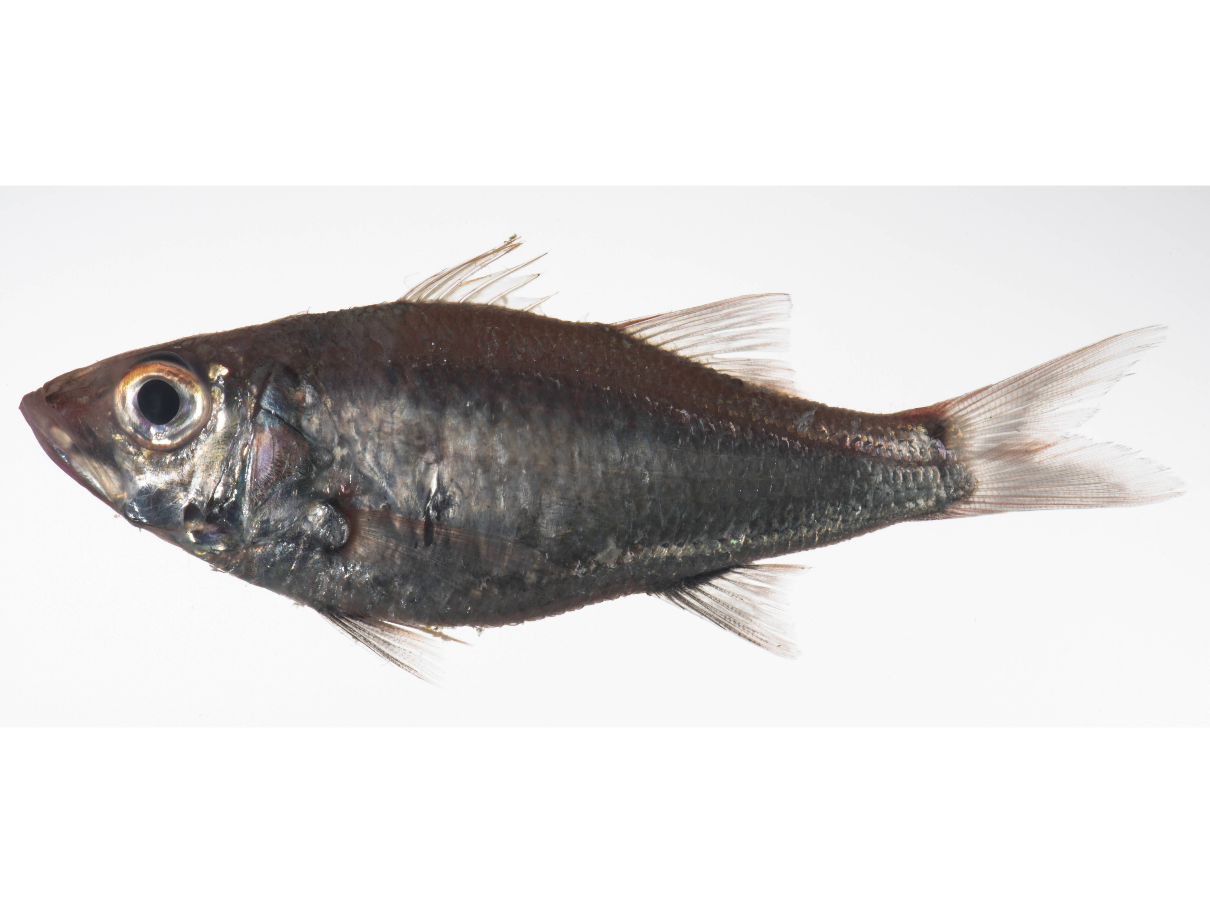
- Acropoma leobergi

Scientific classification
- Kingdom: Animalia
- Phylum: Chordata
- Class: Actinopterygii
- Order: Acropomatiformes
- Family: Acropomatidae
- Genus: Acropoma
- Species: A. leobergi

Binomial name
- Acropoma leobergi Prokofiev, 2018

= Acropoma leobergi =

Tropical lanternbelly

Species of ray-finned fish

The Tropical lanternbelly, Acropoma leobergi is a species of the genus Acropoma described as having a luminous organ behind the anus that resembles a "U" in shape. The species is native to the Arafura Sea.

== Etymology ==
The fish is named in honor of Lev (or Leo) Semyonovich Berg (1876-1950), a Russian ichthyologist, after who the fishing vessel Academician Berg was also named, and from which the type specimens was collected in 1967.
