= Whitechin surgeonfish =

Conservation status
- Data Deficient (IUCN 3.1)

Scientific classification
- Kingdom: Animalia
- Phylum: Chordata
- Class: Actinopterygii
- Order: Acanthuriformes
- Family: Acanthuridae
- Genus: Acanthurus
- Species: A. albimento

Binomial name
- Acanthurus albimento K. E. Carpenter, J. T. Williams & M. D. Santos, 2017

Species of fish

The whitechin surgeonfish (Acanthurus albimento) is a species of marine ray-finned fish belonging to the family Acanthuridae, the surgeonfishes, unicornfishes and tangs. It is endemic to the waters of the western Pacific Ocean in the Philippines.

== Taxonomy ==
The whitechin surgeonfish was first formally described in 2017 by Kent E. Carpenter, Jeffrey Taylor Williams & Mudjekeewis Dalisay Santos with its type locality given as Aurora Province, northeast Luzon in the Philippines. The genus Acanthurus is one of two genera in the tribe Acanthurini which is one of three tribes in the subfamily Acanthurinae which is one of two subfamilies in the family Acanthuridae.

== Etymology ==
The whitechin surgeonfish has the specific name albimento which is a compound of albus, meaning "white", and mento, meaning "chin". This is a reference to the white chin shown by this species.

== Description ==
The whitechin surgeonfish has 9 spines and between 26 and 28 soft rays supporting the dorsal fin while the anal fin is supported by 3 spines and between 25 and 27 soft rays. The depth of the body is roughly half the standard length. In adults the dorsal profile of the head is clearly convex. The caudal fin has a clearly crescent moon or lunate shape. The overall colour of this fish is brown with many blue and dark stripes on the head and body. There is a clear whitish band on the chin which merges with a whitish upper lip band. There is a rufous band at the base of the dorsal fin and the caudal fin has a whitish base. This species has a maximum published standard length of 25.2 cm (9.9 in).

== Distribution and habitat ==
The whitechin surgeonfish is endemic to the Western Pacific Ocean, it is known from six specimens, all collected from fish markets on Luzon so information on the extent of its range, habitat and behaviour is very limited.
