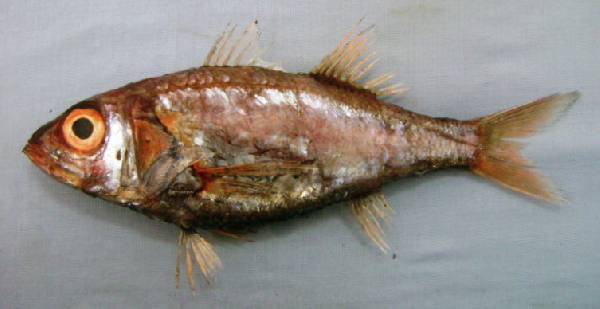
- Acropoma japonicum
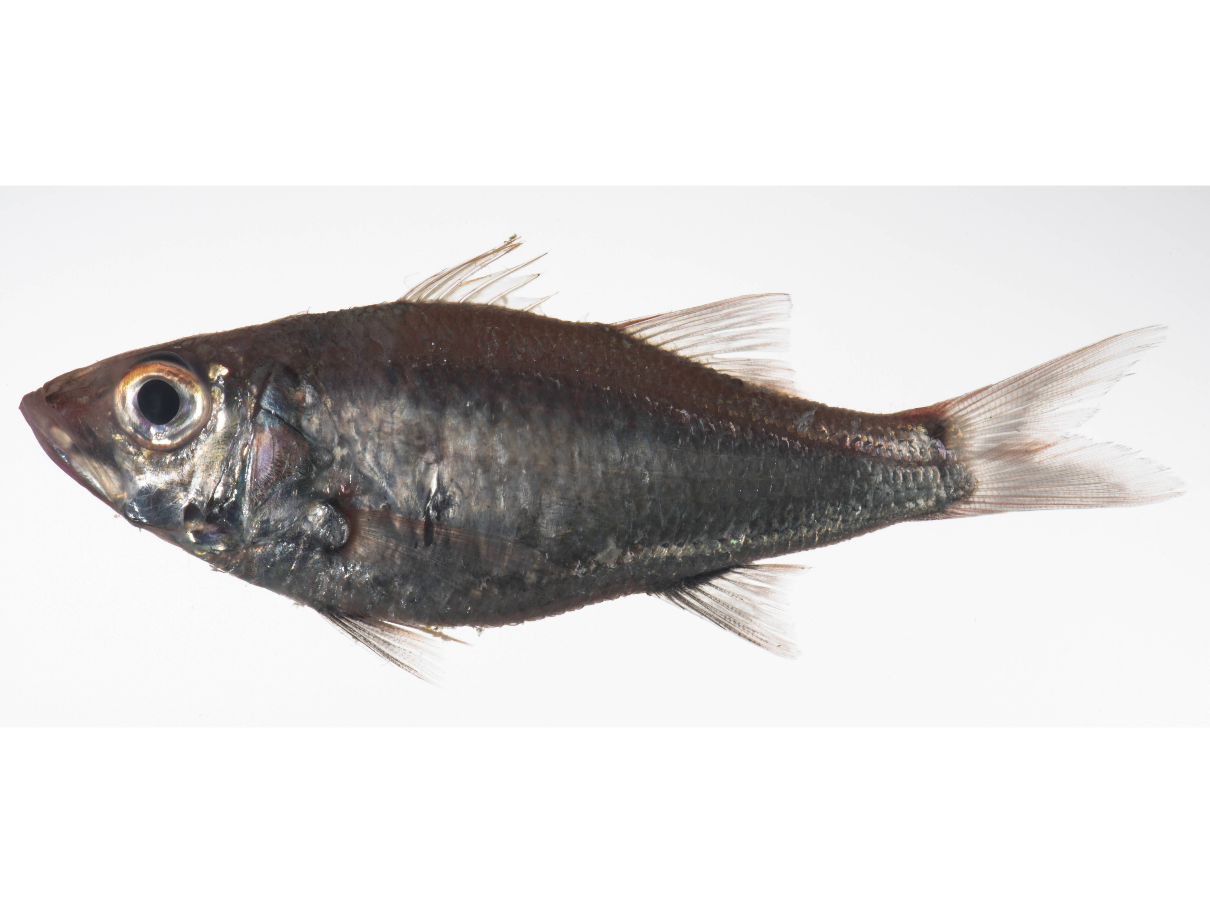
- Acropoma leobergi

Scientific classification
- Kingdom: Animalia
- Phylum: Chordata
- Class: Actinopterygii
- Division: Teleostei
- Order: Acropomatiformes
- Family: Acropomatidae
- Genus: Acropoma; Temminck & Schlegel, 1843

Type species
- Acropoma japonicum Günther, 1859

= Acropoma =

Acropoma Temporal range: Early Eocene to present

Genus of ray-finned fish

Acropoma is a genus of ray-finned fish in the family Acropomatidae, the temperate ocean-basses or lanternbellies. They are native to the Indian Ocean and western Pacific Ocean. They are characterized by a ventral luminous organ that has a luminous gland, a lens, and a reflector. The shape of the luminous organ helps distinguish the species in the genus.

== Species ==
The following species are currently recognised as being members of this genus:

- Acropoma arafurensis Okamoto, J.T. Williams, K.E. Carpenter, M. D. Santos & Seishi Kimura, 2019
- Acropoma argentistigma Okamoto & H. Ida, 2002
- Acropoma boholensis Yamanoue & Matsuura, 2002
- Acropoma hanedai Matsubara, 1953
- Acropoma heemstrai Okamoto & Golani, 2017
- Acropoma japonicum Günther, 1859 (Glowbelly)
- Acropoma lecorneti Fourmanoir, 1988
- Acropoma lacrima Okamoto & Golani 2017
- Acropoma leobergi Prokofiev, 2018
- Acropoma musorstom, Okamoto, J. E. Randall, Motomura, 2021
- Acropoma neglectum Okamoto & Golani 2017
- Acropoma profundum Okamoto, 2014 (Solomon's lanternbelly)
- Acropoma splendens (Lloyd, 1909)

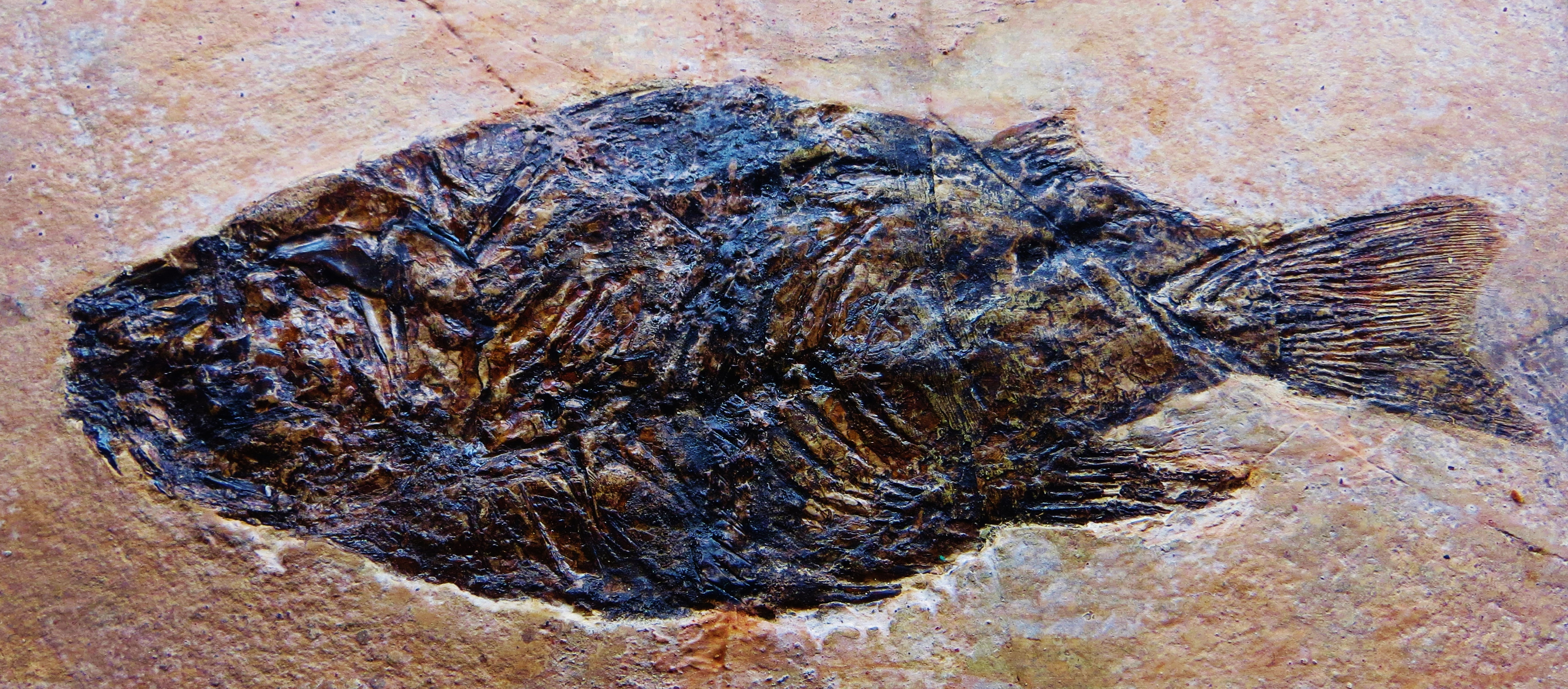
Fossil specimen of Acropoma lepidotum

The fossil species †Acropoma lepidotum (Agassiz, 1836) is known from the Early Eocene of Monte Bolca, Italy. An indeterminate Acropoma species is also known from fossil remains from the Middle Miocene of Italy.

== Additional reading ==
- Ghedotti, Michael J., Josephine N. Gruber, Ryan W. Barton, Matthew P. Davis and W. Leo Smith. “Morphology and evolution of bioluminescent organs in the glowbellies (Percomorpha: Acropomatidae) with comments on the taxonomy and phylogeny of Acropomatiformes.” Journal of Morphology 279 (2018): 1640 - 1653.
