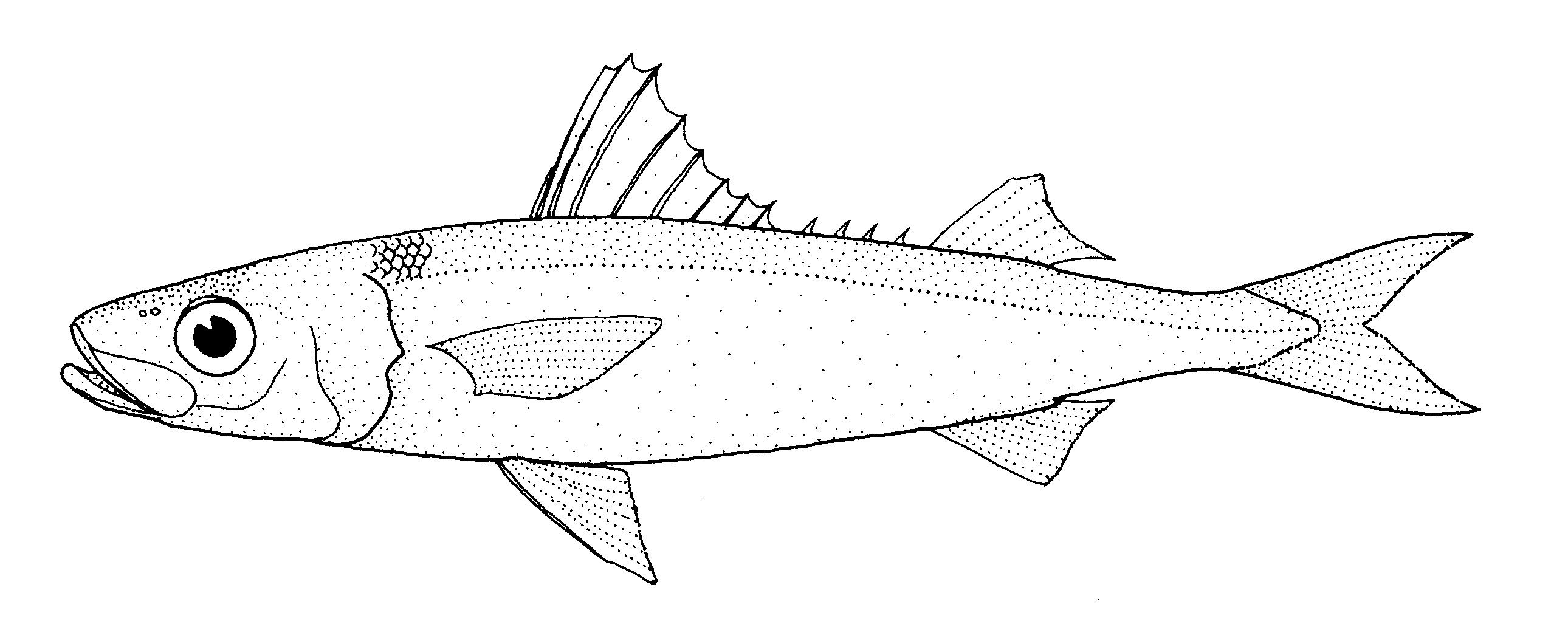
- Drawing by Dr Tony Ayling

Conservation status
- Least Concern (IUCN 3.1)

Scientific classification
- Kingdom: Animalia
- Phylum: Chordata
- Class: Actinopterygii
- Order: Acanthuriformes
- Family: Emmelichthyidae
- Genus: Emmelichthys
- Species: E. nitidus

Binomial name
- Emmelichthys nitidus J. Richardson, 1845

= Emmelichthys nitidus =

Species of fish

Emmelichthys nitidus, the Cape bonnetmouth, bonnetmouth, redbait, pearl fish, picarel, red baitfish, red herring or Southern rover, is a species of marine ray-finned fish belonging to the family Emmelichthyidae, the rovers and bonnetmouths. This species is found in the Indian and Pacific oceans. This species is of minor importance to commercial fisheries.

== Taxonomy ==
Emmelichthys nitidus was first formally described in 1845 by the Scottish naval surgeon, naturalist and Arctic explorer Sir John Richardson with its type locality given as Western Australia. Richardson classified the new species in a new monospecific genus, Emmelichthys, so this species is that genus's type species. The Cape bonnetmouth was formerly split into two subspecies but what was the southeastern Pacific subspecies E. n. cyanescens has been treated as a separate valid species Emmelichthys cyanescens since 2014. The specific name nitidus means "neat", Richardson described the fish as having a "neat aspect".

== Description ==
Emmelichthys nitidus has a slender, slightly compressed body which is around a fifth as deep as its standard length and with a caudal peduncle which is very thin just in front of the caudal fin. It has a moderately small head with large eyes and a moderately-sized, oblique and highly protrusible mouth with just a small number of small conical teeth on the front of the lower jaw with the upper jaw usually being toothless and no teeth on the vomer, palatine or tongue, The head and body are covered in small ctenoid scales except for over the preorbital area and the tip of the snout. The dorsal fin contains 13 or 15 spines, with the first 9 or 10 spines contained in the fin membrane with 2 or 3 short isolated spines with the final spine being connected to the membrane of the soft rayed part of the fin which is supported by between 9 and 11 soft rays. The anal fin is supported by 3 spines and 9 or 10 soft rays. The caudal fin is forked, the pectoral fins are of moderate size and have rounded tips while the pelvic fins are small. This species reached a maximum total length of 55 cm (22 in). The colour of the body is a metallic blue-grey on the upper body, with silver flanks and ventral surface, with the flanks having a pink flush and pinkish fins.

== Distribution and habitat ==
Emmelichthys nitidus is found in the south eastern Atlantic around Tristan da Cunha and along the southern African coast in Namibia south to the Western Cape. In the Indian Ocean it has been recorded from Madagascar and occurs around St. Paul and Amsterdam islands. It occurs along the southern coasts of Australia from southern Western Australia east to Sydney and off Tasmania. It is also found in New Zealand waters. It is a pelagic species found in open water at depths between 86 and 500 m (282 and 1,640 ft).

== Biology ==
Emmelichthys nitidus gathers in schools with the juveniles being found near the surface, frequently mixed in with schools of other pelagic fish, especially clupeids while the adults occur close to the bottom in deeper water. They feed on zooplankton, particularly crustaceans such as krill. It is an important prey for a number of marine predators such as tuna, seabirds and marine mammals. Off Tasmania they have a spawning season which lasts for two months and is stimulated by the rising of the water temperature in Spring. The females spawn asynchronously in batchesbut the number of eggs laid is unknown but they spawn a batch of eggs every 3-5 days.

== Utilisation ==
Emmelichthys nitidus is targeted by trawl fisheries and the catch is used for human consumption, for fishmeal human consumption, fishmeal, which is used in the aquaculture of bluefin tuna, and as bait. It is a frequent bycatch in the pichard fishery off New Zealand and in the demersal trawl fishery for hake off South Africa, where it is then sold as bait.
