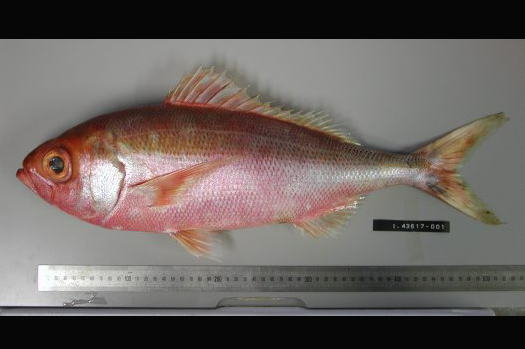
- Specimen from Sydney Fish Market

Conservation status
- Least Concern (IUCN 3.1)

Scientific classification
- Kingdom: Animalia
- Phylum: Chordata
- Class: Actinopterygii
- Order: Acanthuriformes
- Family: Emmelichthyidae
- Genus: Plagiogeneion
- Species: P. rubiginosum

Binomial name
- Plagiogeneion rubiginosum (F. W. Hutton, 1875)

Synonyms
- Therapon rubiginosus F. W. Hutton, 1875

= Rubyfish =

Species of fish

The rubyfish (Plagiogeneion rubiginosum), also known as the cosmopolitan rubyfish, red ruby or ruby rover, is a species of marine ray-finned fish, belonging to the family Emmelichthyidae, the rovers, bonnetmouths and rubyfishes. This species is found from the southeastern Atlantic Ocean off South Africa through the Indian Ocean to the southwestern Pacific Ocean around Australia and New Zealand. This species is commercially important.

== Taxonomy ==
The rubyfish was first formally described in 1875 as Therapon rubiginosus by the English-born New Zealand geologist and biologist Frederick Hutton, with its type locality given as the coast of Otago in New Zealand. In 1890 Henry Ogg Forbes reclassified T. rubiginosus in a new monospecific genus Plagiogeneion, making this the type species of that genus. Plagiogeneion is classified within the family Emmelichthyidae in the order Acanthuriformes.

== Etymology ==
The specific name rubiginosum means "rusty" and refers to the overall reddish colour of this fish. As Forbes's generic name Plagiogeneion is neuter, the ending of Hutton's specific name had to be altered to -um.

== Description ==
The rubyfish has a moderately elongated body with a single continuous dorsal fin and a strongly forked caudal fin, with a highly protrusible mouth. The dorsal fin is supported by 12 or 13 spines and 10 or 11 soft rays, while the anal fin has 3 spines and 10 soft rays. The body has a depth of between 27% and 34% of the standard length. The head and upper body are red with a silvery lower body and blackish tips to the caudal fin. This species reaches a maximum published total length of 60 cm (24 in).

== Distribution and habitat ==
The rubyfish is found in the southeastern Atlantic over the Vema Seamount to the west of Cape Town, and Walvis Bay in Namibia. In the Indian Ocean it is found off Algoa Bay in the Eastern Cape, around Île Saint-Paul and Île Amsterdam and east to southern Australia and New Zealand. In Australia its range extends from West of Bunbury, Western Australia, along the temperate southern coast to Cape Byron, New South Wales, including Tasmania. It is a bathydemersal fish found at depths of from 50 to 600 m (160 to 1,970 ft), near sand or mud bottoms, typically in the vicinity of the edge of the continental shelf and around seamounts. The juveniles are epipelagic, and as they mature, they descend into deeper waters.

== Biology ==
The rubyfish spawns in late spring to early summer. It is a long-lived species and has been estimated to reach 85 years of age. The adults prey on larger zooplankton caught near the bottom.

== Fisheries ==
The rubyfish is an important species for major fisheries in New Zealand and the South Pacific. In some area, this species is fished for over deep sea seamounts. The catch is sold fresh or frozen, and is reputed to be highly palatable.
