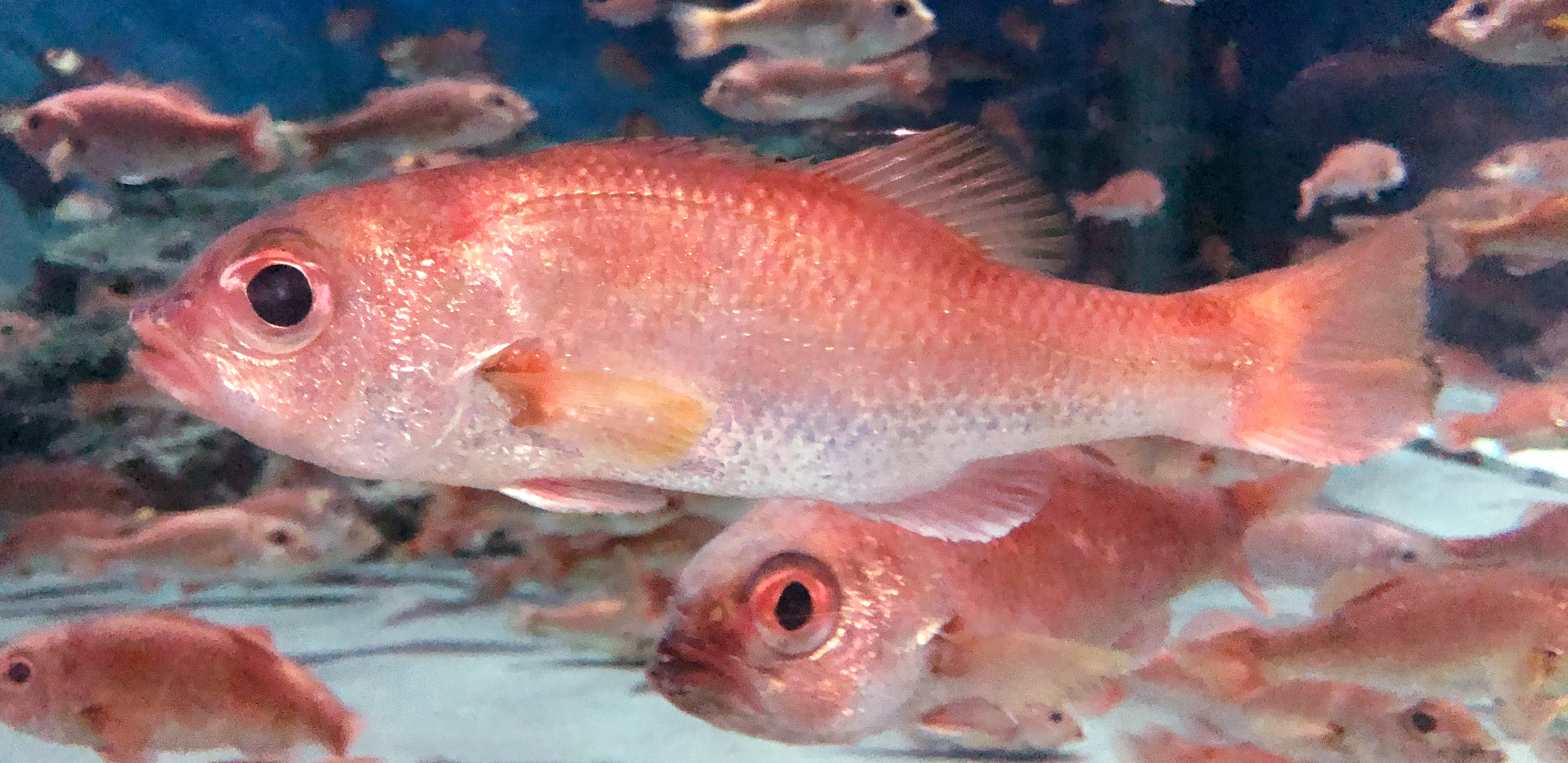

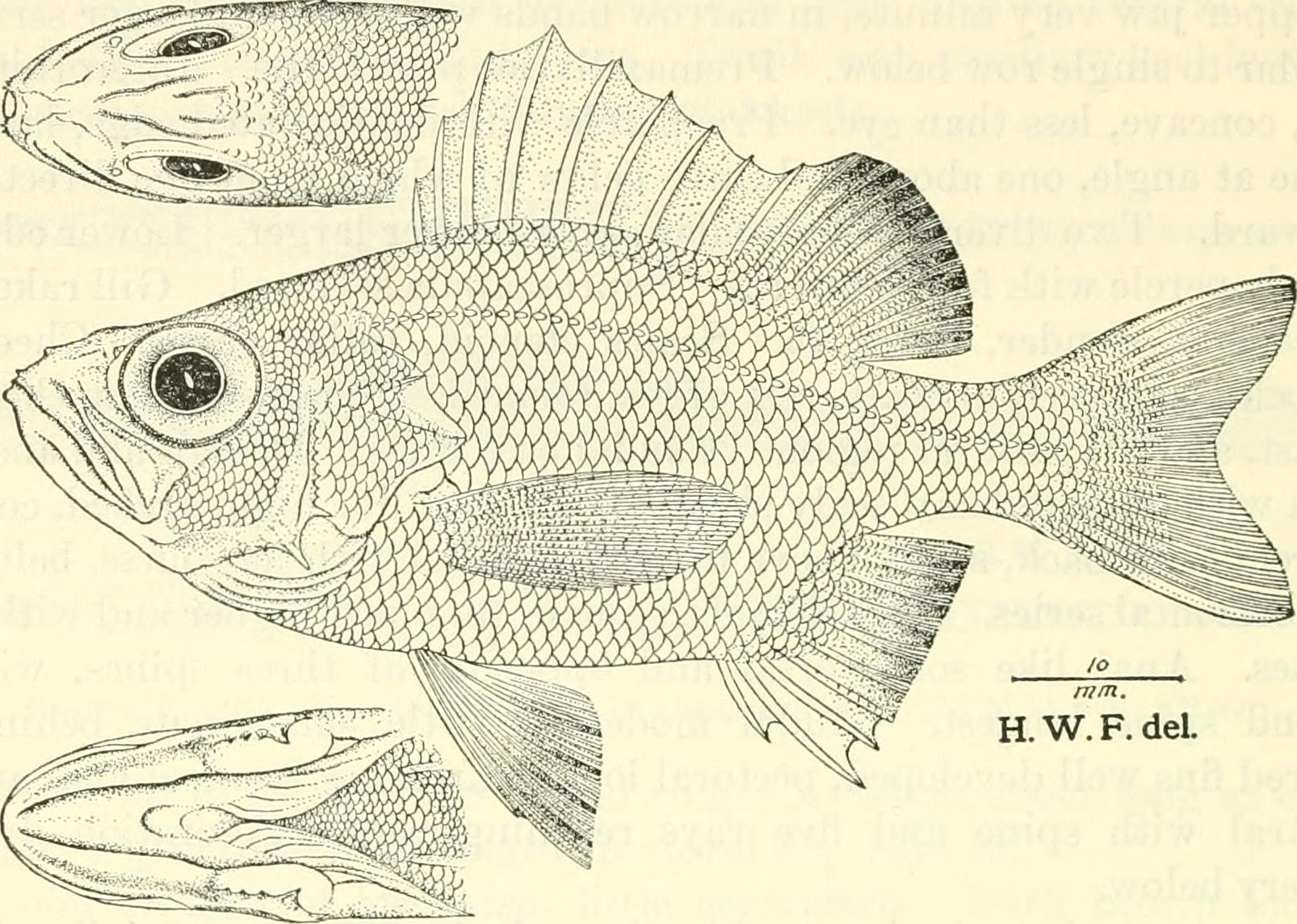

Scientific classification
- Domain: Eukaryota
- Kingdom: Animalia
- Phylum: Chordata
- Class: Actinopterygii
- Order: Acropomatiformes
- Family: Acropomatidae
- Genus: Doederleinia; Steindachner, 1883
- Species: D. berycoides

Binomial name
- Doederleinia berycoides (Hilgendorf, 1879)

Synonyms
- Anthias berycoides Hilgendorf, 1879; Doederleinia orientalis Steindachner & Döderlein, 1883; Rhomboserranus gracilispinis Fowler, 1943; Doederleinia gracilispinis (Fowler, 1943)

= Blackthroat seaperch =

Species of ray-finned fish

The blackthroat seaperch (Doederleinia berycoides), also known as the rosy seabass, is a species of ray-finned fish in the family Acropomatidae, the temperate ocean-basses or lanternbellies. It is the only species in the monotypic genus Doederleinia. It is native to the eastern Indian Ocean and the western Pacific Ocean from Japan to Australia. In Japan it is known as nodoguro or akamutsu.

== Name ==
The generic name honours the German zoologist Ludwig Heinrich Philipp Döderlein (1855-1936).

== Description ==
Its head and body are red in color. It lacks the luminous organ present in many other members of the lanternbelly family. It has rows of conical teeth with large canines. The fish grows to a length of 40 centimetres (16 in) TL.

This species is found at depths of 100 to 600 metres (330 to 1,970 ft).

== Relationship with humans ==
The rosy seabass is of commercial importance as a food fish. This high value has inspired biological and ecological studies that may be useful in the management of its fishery. It is highly valued as a food fish in Taiwan; in 2024 it was valued at US$44.60 to US$63.70 per kilo for larger individuals.

It has been artificially bred in Japan and Taiwan with efforts being made both towards aquaculture and releasing fry/juvenile fish into the wild.

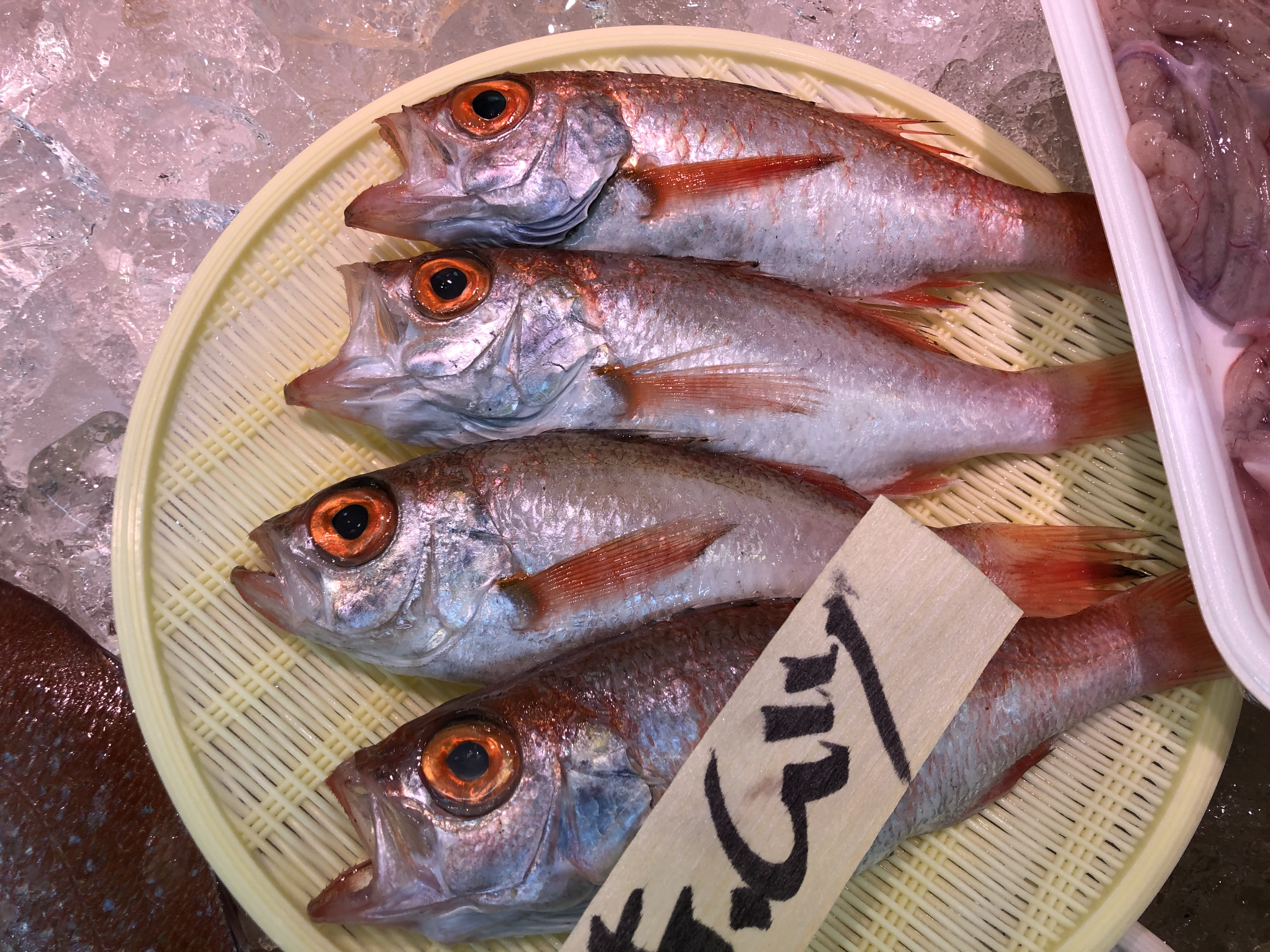
Being sold in Japan

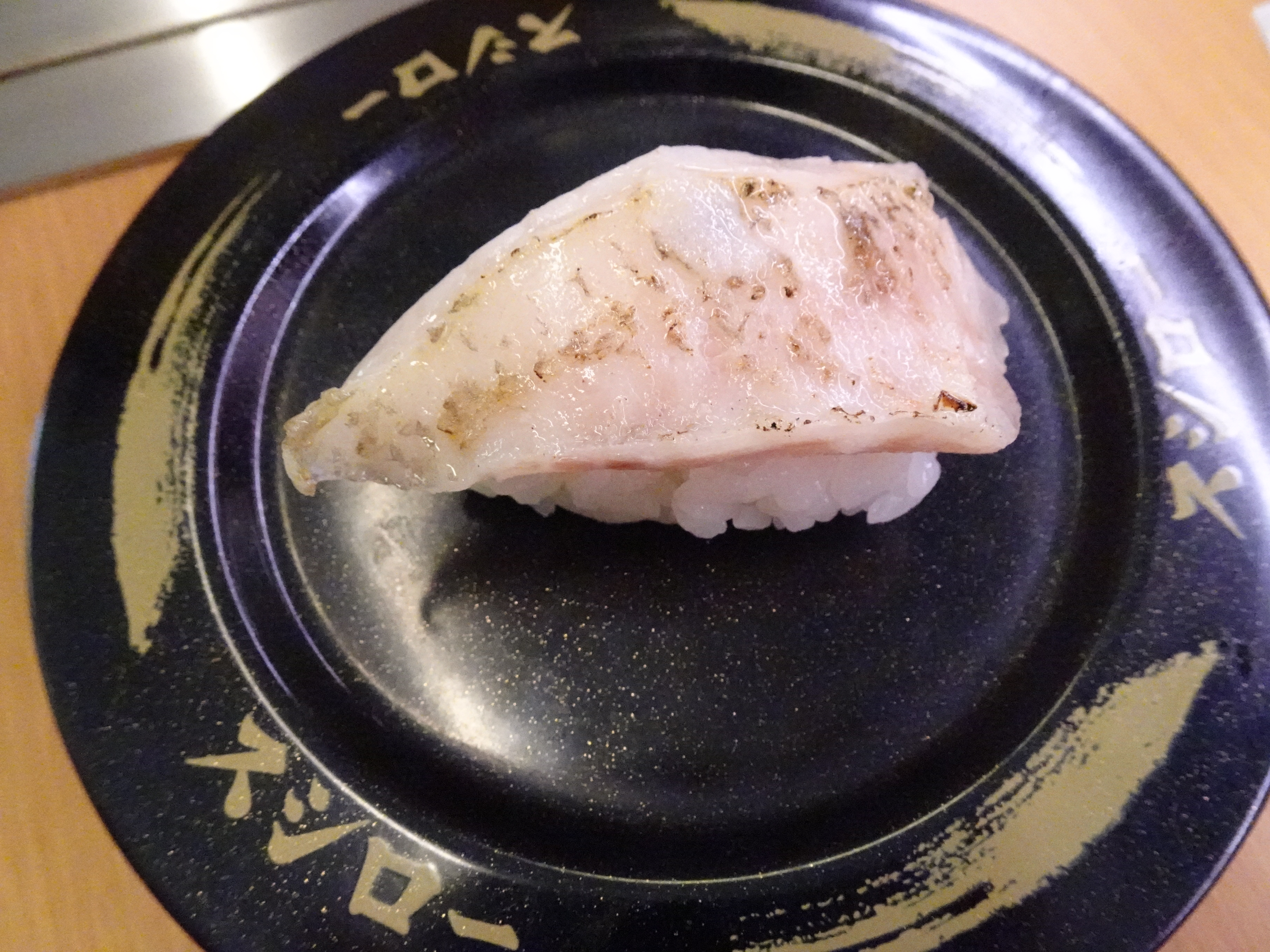
As sushi

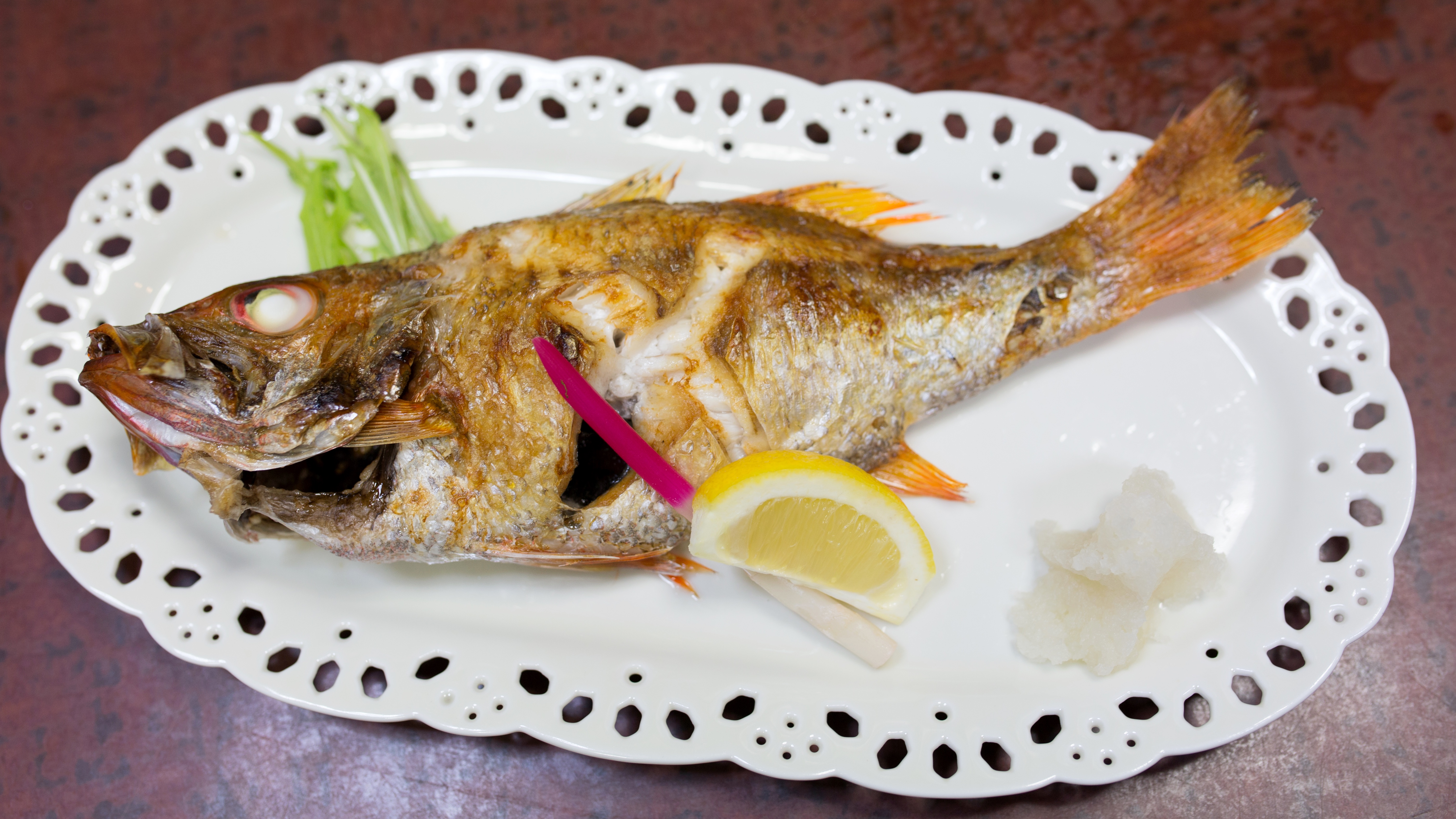
Grilled
