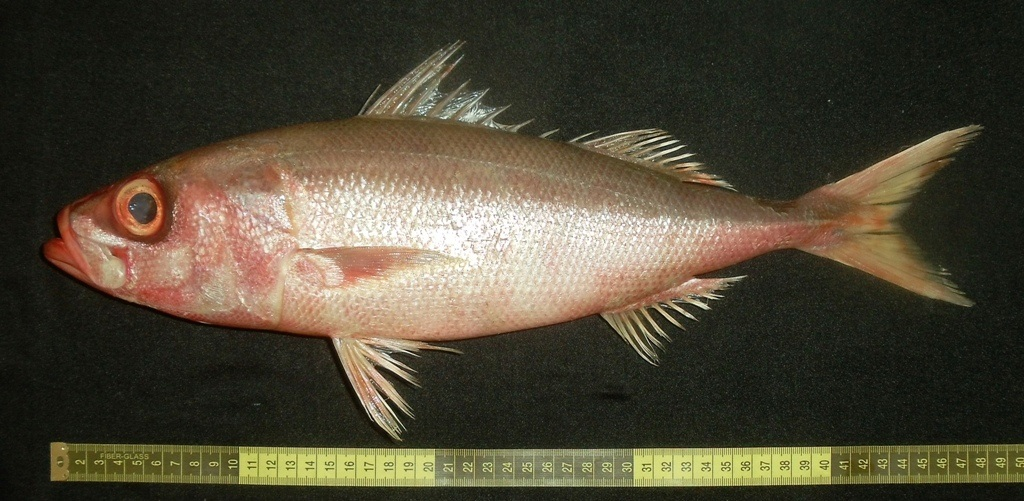
- Japanese rubyfish (E. schlegelii)

Scientific classification
- Kingdom: Animalia
- Phylum: Chordata
- Class: Actinopterygii
- Order: Acanthuriformes
- Family: Emmelichthyidae
- Genus: Erythrocles; D. S. Jordan, 1919

Type species
- Emmelichthys schlegelii J. Richardson, 1846

Synonyms
- Erythrichthys Temminck & Schlegel, 1845

= Erythrocles =

Genus of fishes

Erythrocles is a genus of marine ray-finned fishes belonging to the family Emmelichthyidae, the rovers, bonnetmouths or rubyfishes. The fishes in this genus are found in the western Atlantic, Pacific and Indian Oceans.

== Taxonomy ==
Erythrocles was first proposed as a genus name in 1919 by the American ichthyologist David Starr Jordan as a replacement for Erythtichthys, a name proposed by Coenraad Jacob Temminck and Hermann Schlegel in 1845 but which was preoccupied by a name proposed by Charles Lucien Bonaparte in 1831 as an unnecessary replacement for the trahira genus Erythrinus Scopoli, 1777. Temminck and Schlegel did not add any species to the genus they described but John Richardson added one, Emmelichthys schlegelii, in 1846. In 1919 Jordan published his replacement name and confirmed Richardson's E. schlegelii as the type species. The genus is classified in the small family Emmelichthyidae which is included in the order Acanthuriformes.

== Species ==
There are currently six recognized species in this genus:

- Erythrocles acarina Kotthaus, 1974
- Erythrocles microceps Miyahara & Okamura, 1998
- Erythrocles monodi Poll & Cadenat, 1954 – Atlantic rubyfish
- Erythrocles schlegelii (J. Richardson, 1846) – Japanese rubyfish
- Erythrocles scintillans (D. S. Jordan & W. F. Thompson, 1912) – golden kali kali
- Erythrocles taeniatus J. E. Randall & Rivaton, 1992

== Characteristics ==
Erythrocles rubyfishes have an oblong body that has a depth of one-fifth to one-third of its standard length and which is less than the length of the head. The dorsal fin is incised to its base immediately before the last dorsal fin spine. The first dorsal fin contains 10 spines with the second dorsal fin having a single spine and between 10 and 12 soft rays. The anal fin has 2 or 3 spines and 9 or 10 soft rays. The final 2 rays of dorsal and anal fins are elongated, notably longer than the ray immediately in front of them and largely enclosed in a sheath covered in scales. The lower margin of the preorbital bone is smooth or may have tiny serrations. The largest species is the Japanese rubyfish (E. schlegelii) with a maximum published total length of 72 cm (28 in) while the smallest is E. acarina which has a maximum published standard length of 8.9 cm (3.5 in).

== Distribution ==
Erythrocles rubyfishes are found in the eastern and western central Atlantic, the Indian and the western and central Pacific Oceans.
