= Mudjekeewis D. Santos =

Filipino fisheries scientist

Mudjekeewis Dalisay Santos
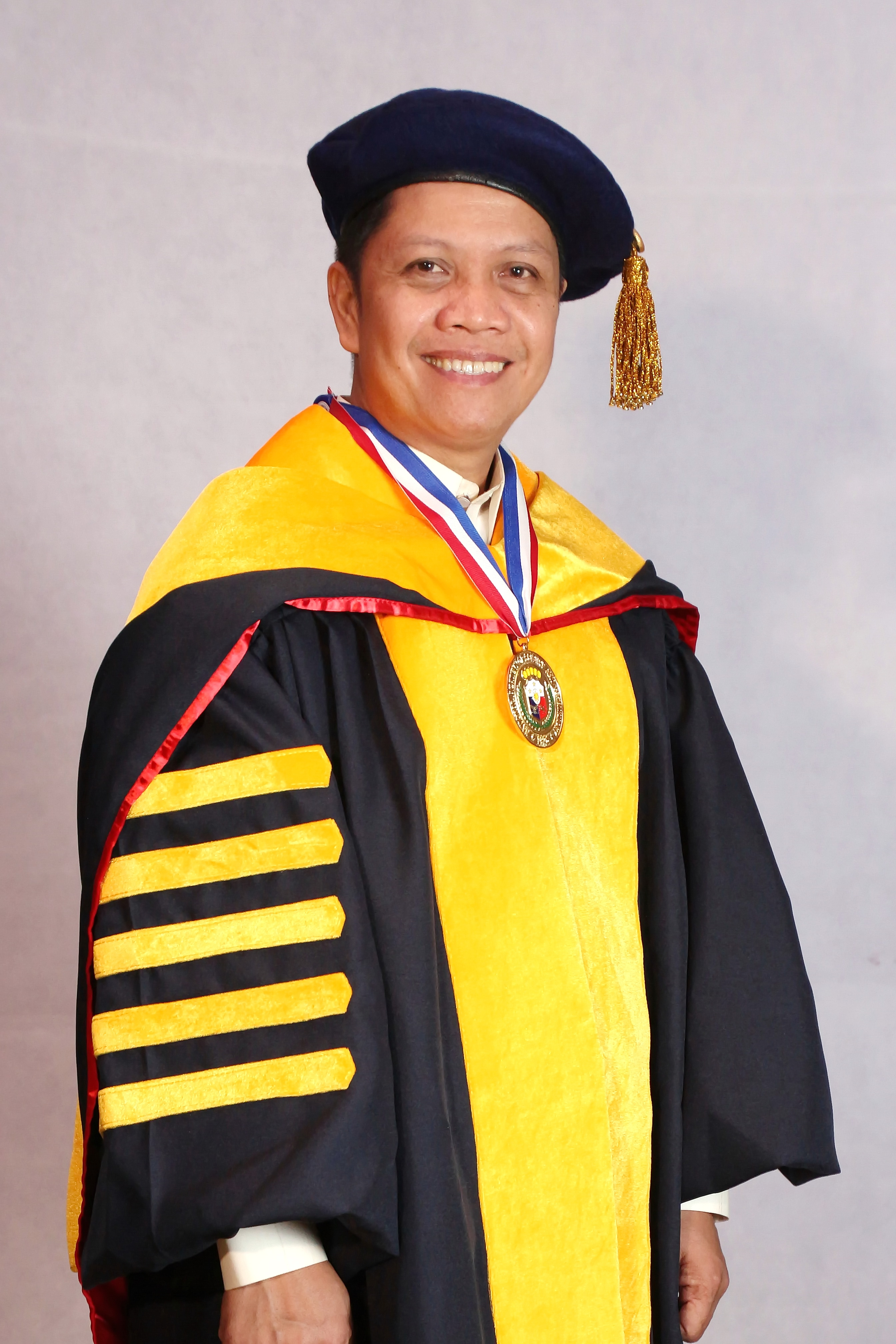
- Born: June 7, 1971 (age 55); Baguio City, Philippines
- Education: University of the Philippines Baguio; Tokyo University of Marine Science and Technology
- Scientific career
- Fields: Fisheries Science, Marine Biology
- Workplaces: National Fisheries Research and Development Institute; National Academy of Science and Technology; University of the Philippines Vanguard Incorporated; Philippine Society of Biochemistry and Molecular Biology; Philippine Association of Career Scientists; Outstanding Young Scientists, Inc.

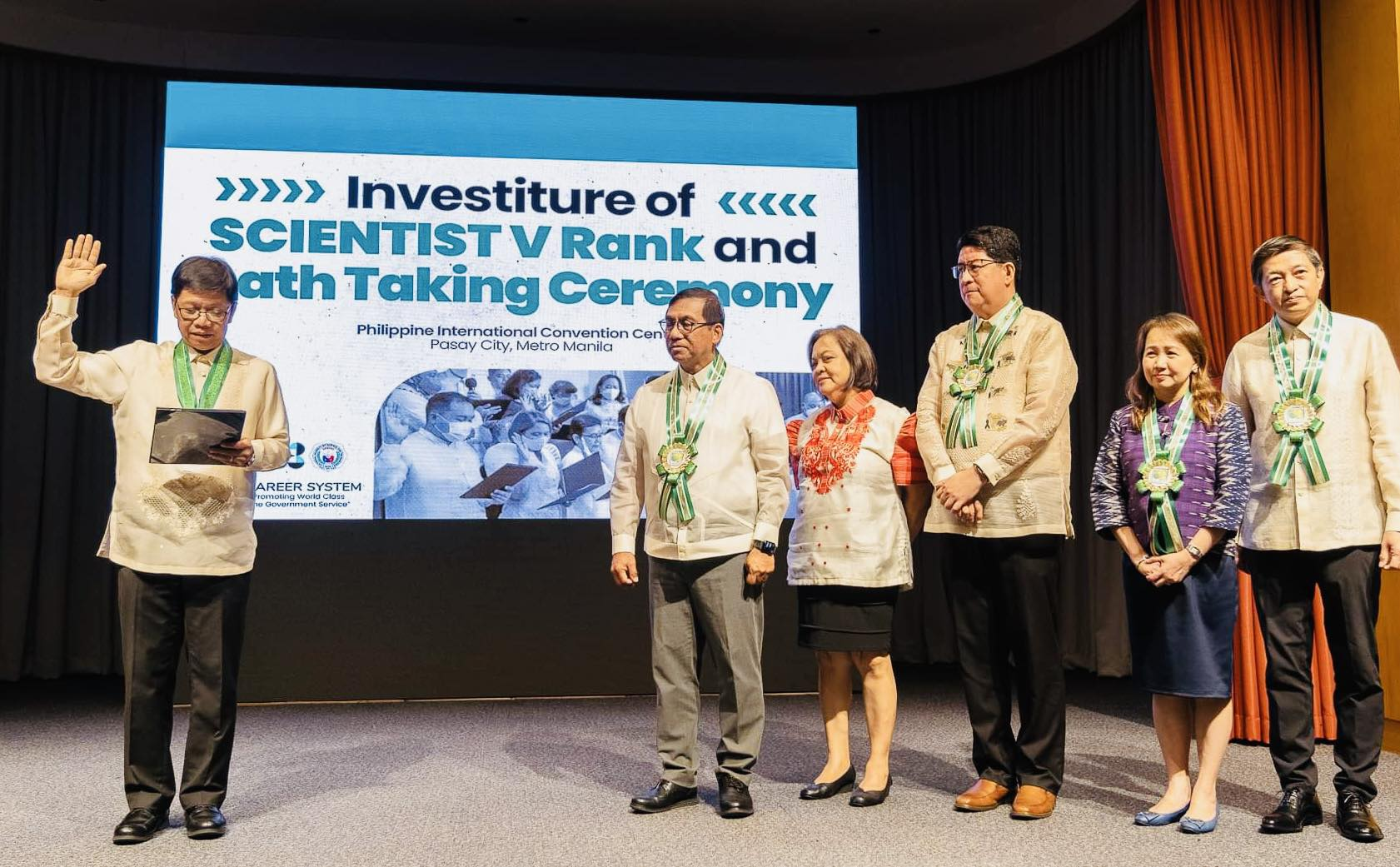
Santos, with the members of the Scientific Career Council, during his oathtaking as the first-ever Career Scientist V in the Philippines on December 11, 2023 at the Philippine International Convention Center (PICC).

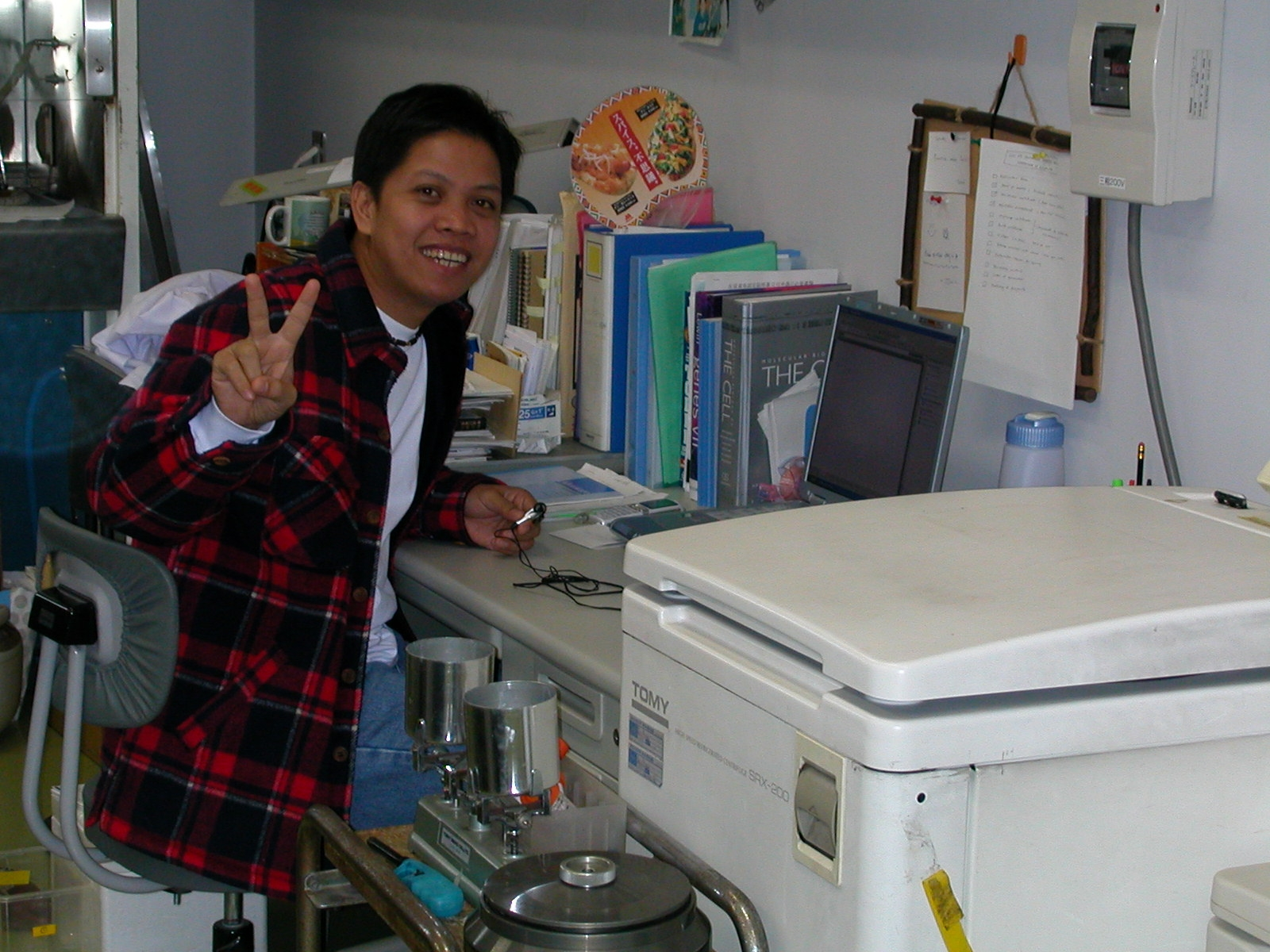
Santos during his study in the Laboratory of Genome Science, Tokyo University of Marine Science and Technology 2002

Mudjekeewis Dalisay Santos (born June 7, 1971) is a Filipino fisheries scientist and marine biologist at the National Fisheries Research and Development Institute (NFRDI). He was the first Career Scientist to have been conferred the Scientist V rank by the Scientific Career System. In July 2018, he was elected and conferred as an academician member of the National Academy of Science and Technology of the Philippines (NAST-PHL). His fields of interest in fisheries science are genetics, resource assessment, aquatic biodiversity, biotechnology, climate change adaptation, and policy.

A marine fish was named after him in 2015 (Chelidoperca santosi), by two of the world's leading fish taxonomists, Jeffrey Williams and Kent Carpenter. In the same year, an Islet in Zamboanga City was named in his honor, "Mudjie Wise Key Islet," by the people of Barangay Dita, Zamboanga City. Later, he was officially recognized by the City of Zamboanga and by the Bureau of Fisheries and Aquatic Resources (BFAR) as one of the prime movers of the sardine fishing closure in the peninsula that not only benefitted the city but the entire country as well.

== Early life and education ==
Santos was born in Baguio City, Philippines. He was the firstborn of Juanario N. Santos and Guadalupe Dalisay, both government employees of the Department of Agriculture. He spent his elementary days at the Basa Air Base Elementary School in Floridablanca, Pampanga and Special Education (SPED) Center in Baguio City. He studied high school at the Chevalier School in Angeles City.

In 1992, he obtained his bachelor's degree in biology from the University of the Philippines (UP) College Baguio. He was also assigned as a Deputy Corps Commander and Cadet Lieutenant Colonel of the university's Reserve Officer Training Corps (ROTC).

He started his government career in 1992 as a commandant of the UP College Baguio High School Citizen. From 1992 to 1995, he was a research assistant at UP College Baguio and UP Diliman. He became an Aquaculturist I of the Bureau of Fisheries and Aquatic Resources (BFAR) in 1995 and eventually got promoted to Supervising Aquaculturist of the National Fisheries Research and Development Institute (NFRDI) in 2001.

He pursued his Master's and Ph.D. degrees in biosciences at the Tokyo University of Marine Science and Technology (TUMSAT), Japan, as a Japanese Government (Monbukagakusho) scholar. He graduated with an MS in Aquatic Biosciences and a Ph.D. in Applied Marine Biosciences. After which, he did a Post-Doctoral Fellowship at TUMSAT under Professor Takashi Aoki.

He returned to the Philippines in 2009 to resume his research work and official function in NFRDI. This was followed by his conferment as a career scientist under the Scientific Career System (CSC) implemented by the Civil Service Commission (CSC) and the Department of Science and Technology (DOST). He was conferred as Scientist I in 2010, Scientist II in 2014, Scientist IV in 2021 and currently the first-ever Career Scientist V in the country conferred in December 2023.

== Research and involvements ==
Santos' research interests are in fisheries science, specifically in the areas of genetics, resource assessment, aquatic biodiversity, biotechnology, climate change adaptation, and policy. Santos has authored and co-authored over 100 scientific publications.

He co-authored the discovery of new fish species such as the Whitechin surgeonfish, Acanthurus albimento and the Arafura lanternbelly, Acropoma arafurensis. He also helped determine a number of first records of marine species in the Philippines including the Bali sardine, Sardinella lemuru, Tawian sardinella, S. hualiensis, Blacknape Large-Eye Bream, Gymnocranius satoi, Bohol lanternbelly, Acropoma boholensis, Pacific bluefin tuna, Thunnus orientalis, Deranayigala’s beaked whale, Mesoplodon hotaula and Noah’s giant clam, Tridacna noae

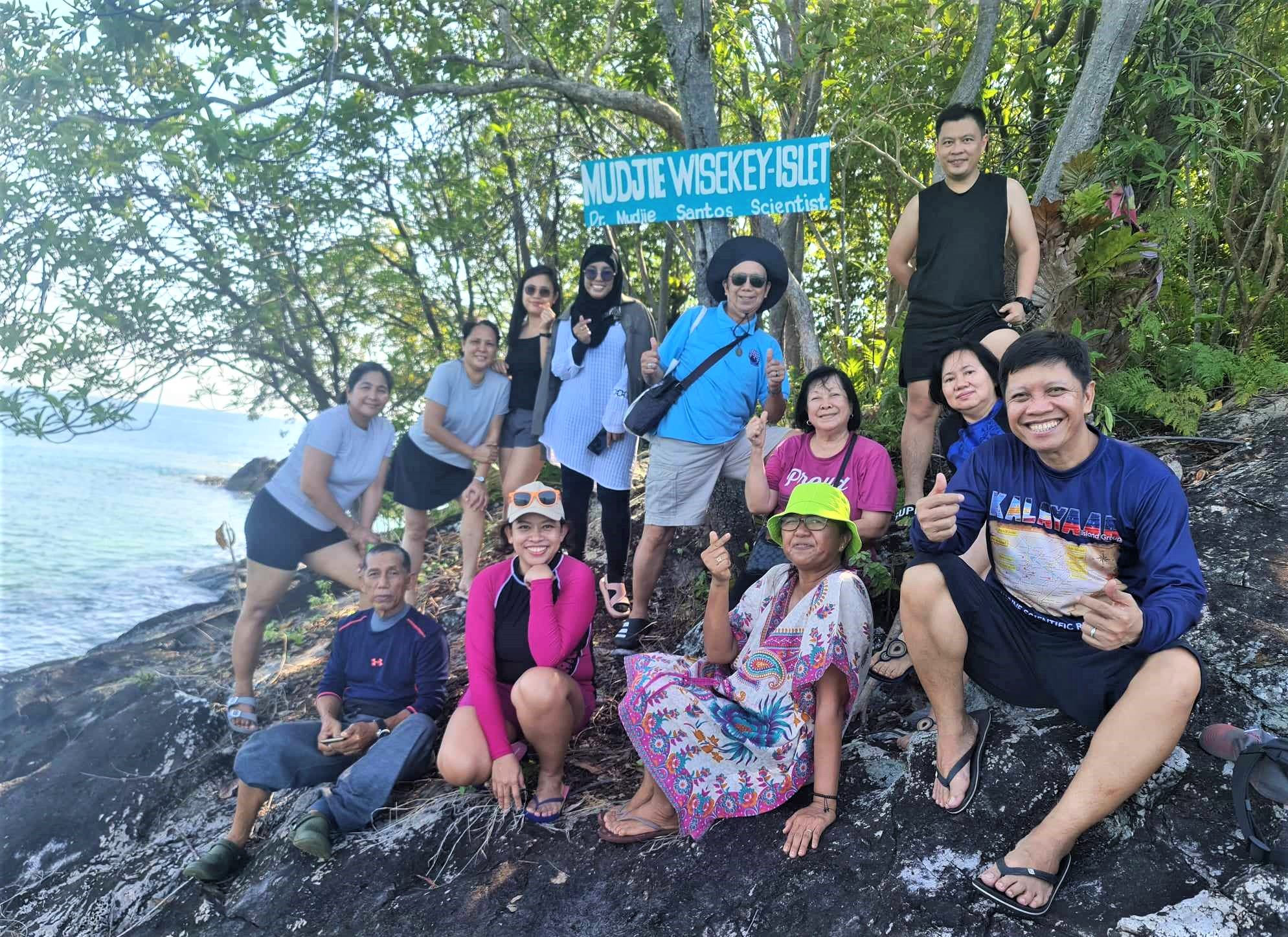
Santos and team in Mudjie Wise Key Islet, Dita, Zamboanga City, Philippines 2023

He became an academician of the National Academy of Science and Technology last 2018.

In 2015, Jeffrey Williams and Kent Carpenter named a marine fish after him in recognition of his contributions to marine scientific research in the country. The Pogi perchlet, Chelidoperca santosi, was discovered in Iloilo's public fish market which was captured in the province of Palawan.

An islet in Zamboanga City was named "Mudjie Wise Key Islet" by the people of Barangay Dita, Zamboanga City, in honor of his contributions that improved the well-being of the local fisherfolk.

Santos also led The Philippine Journal of Fisheries (TPJF) revival and indexing in 2017 as its Editor-in-Chief. He also serves as an editor of Fisheries Science, a journal of the Japanese Society of Fisheries Science based in Japan and the section editor for Marine and Fishery Sciences of The Philippine Agricultural Scientist, published by the University of the Philippines Los Baños (UPLB). He is recognized as one of United Nations Division for Ocean Affairs and Law of the Sea Pool of Experts under the Asia-Pacific States Region with expertise on fish biology and ecology.

He was also the president of the Philippine Society in Biochemistry and Molecular Biology (PSBMB) since 2022 and of the Philippine Association of Career Scientists (PACS) from 2017 to 2019, which he was a member of since 2011. Santos was also one of the Board of Directors of Outstanding Young Scientists, Inc. (OYSI) from 2014 to 2016.

Santos is into science communication via social media to promote his advocacy on fisheries sustainability and marine biodiversity conservation. His verified Facebook page “Doc Mudjie” already has over 16,000 followers as of 2026.

== Other major contribution to science ==
In 2010, Santos established and developed the NFRDI–Genetic Fingerprinting Laboratory, which is now a leading national facility conducting aquatic species identification, population connectivity, seafood traceability and DNA forensics laboratory activities in support of BFAR and other regulators.

He also revived and transformed The Philippine Journal of Fisheries into a leading, SCOPUS- and internationally indexed journal, serving as editor-in-chief and steering its relaunch and global recognition. The Fisheries Scientific Conference (Fish SciCon), conceptualized and established by Dr. Santos in October 2009, was now a leading platform for transforming fisheries science and technology to policy and adoption used to bridging scientists and researchers to policymakers and stakeholders.

Santos led climate change adaptation for Philippine fisheries by serving as focal person and co-developing the FishVool (fisheries vulnerability tool) and Climate Risk Vulnerability Assessment (CRVA) for Fisheries tool. These tools are now the DA’s primary vulnerability assessment frameworks guiding national policy and investments.

== Awards and accomplishments ==
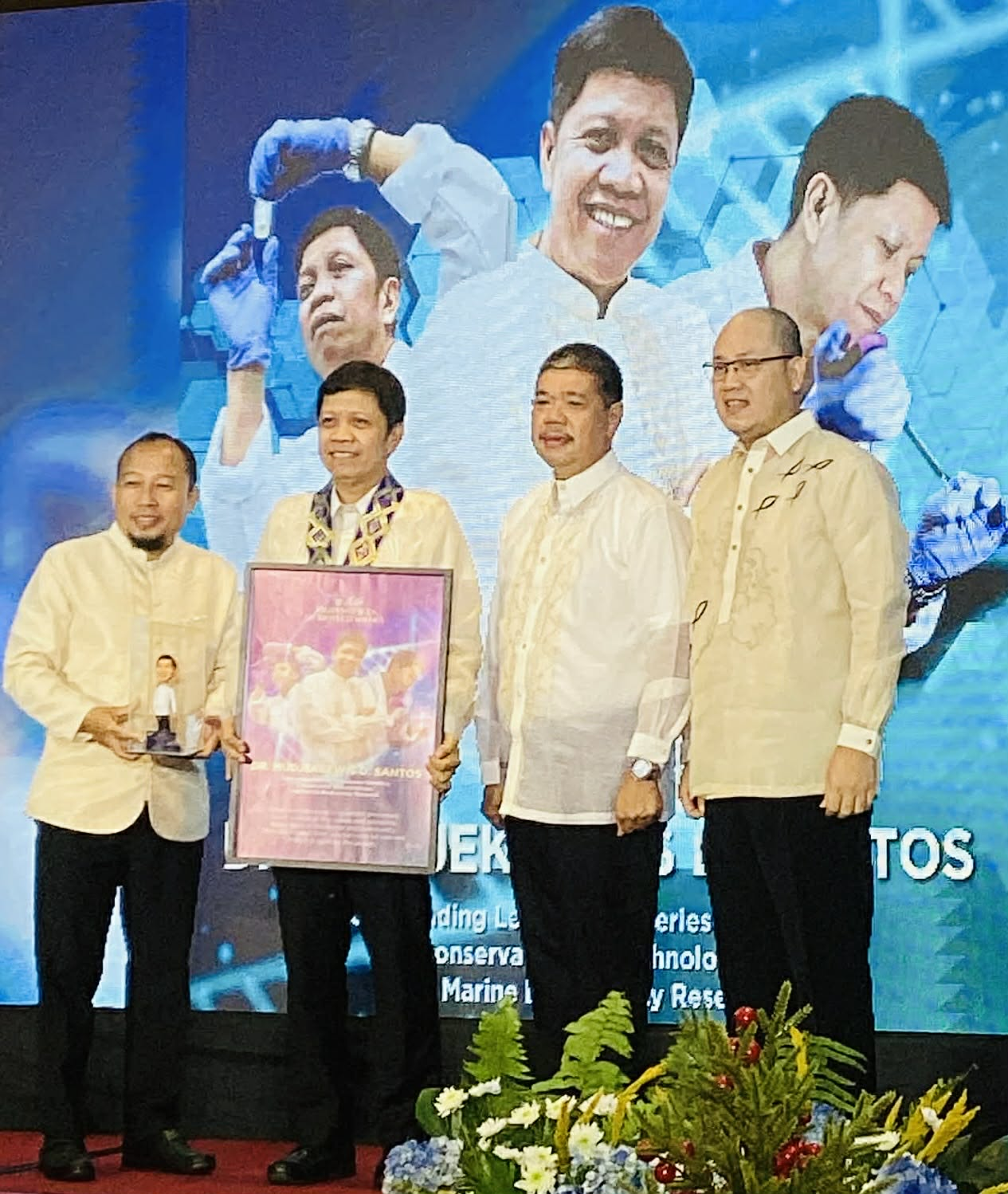
Santos at the awarding ceremony for the 2025 Filipino Faces of Biotechnology Award on December 18, 2025.

Santos was conferred as Career Scientist V by the Scientific Career System in November 2023. He is the first-ever Career Scientist in the Philippines to have accomplished this rank.

In 2019, Santos received the University of the Philippines Alumni Association (UPAA) Achievement Award for Marine Science last August 24, 2019 in the University of the Philippines, Diliman, Quezon City awarded by the University of the Philippines Alumni Association.

A Presidential Lingkod Bayan Award was awarded to Santos during the 2014 Search for Outstanding Public Officials and Employees awarded by the Civil Service Commission and the Office of the President of the Philippines December 15, 2014 in Heroes Hall, Malacañang Palace, Manila.

In 2012, he received the "Parangal ng Pangulo bilang Natatanging Syentista sa Larangan ng Agrikultura" (Presidential Award, Outstanding Agricultural Scientist) from the Office of the President of the Philippines and the Gawad Saka Outstanding Agricultural Scientist from the Department of Agriculture-Bureau of Agricultural Research on November 13, 2012, in Philippine Rice Research Institute, Science City of Munoz, Nueva Ecija.

Santos was given the Outstanding Young Scientist Award for Applied Marine Biosciences by the National Academy of Science and Technology (NAST) on July 14, 2011, in Manila Hotel, Manila.

== Taxon described by him ==
- See Category:Taxa named by Mudjekeewis Dalisay Santos
