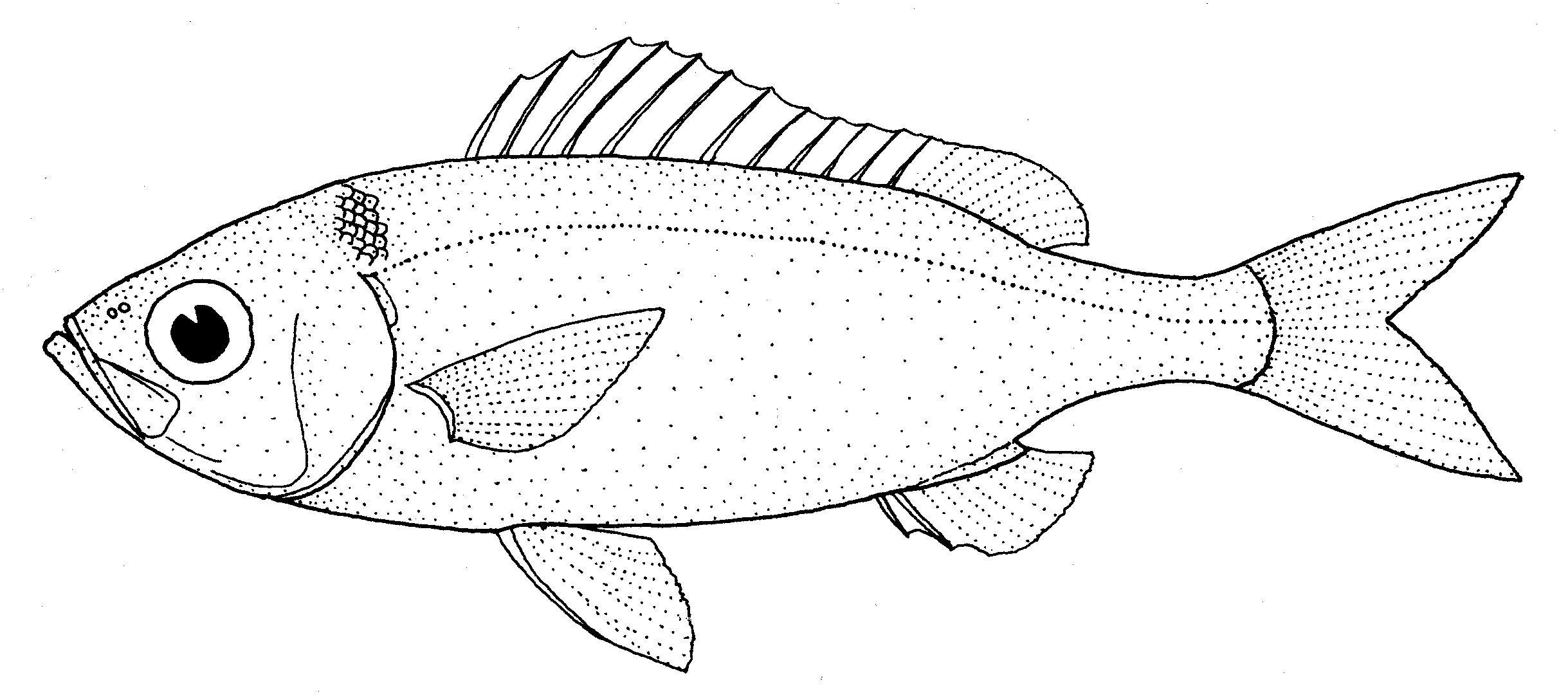
- Rubyfish (Plagiogeneion rubiginosum)

Scientific classification
- Kingdom: Animalia
- Phylum: Chordata
- Class: Actinopterygii
- Order: Acanthuriformes
- Family: Emmelichthyidae; Poey, 1867

Genera
- Emmelichthys; Erythrocles; Plagiogeneion

= Emmelichthyidae =

Family of fishes

Emmelichthyidae is a small family of small to medium-sized marine ray-finned fishes known commonly as redbaits, rovers, bonnetmouths or rubyfishes.

The Emmelichthyidae are poorly known even among researchers who work in fish taxonomy, and as a result much is unknown about species in the family, such as how they feed, breed, and otherwise behave. The most recently discovered species of the family, the papillated redbait (Emmelichthys papillatus). was not identified and described until 2024.

== Taxonomy ==
Emmelichthyidae was first proposed as a taxonomic grouping in 1867 by the Cuban naturalist Felipe Poey. The fifth edition of Fishes of the World classifies the family in the suborder Sciaenoidei, alongside the drum family Sciaenidae, in the order Acanthuriformes. Other authorities classify the Emmelichthyidae and the Sciaenidae as incertae sedis within the series Eupercaria. The Catalog of Fishes retains this family within the Acanthuriformes but does not recognise the suborder Sciaenoidei. The family was formerly regarded as being much larger, including a wide range of plankton-eating fish, but most of the genera previously included were discovered to be unrelated examples of parallel evolution, and were moved to other families.

== Genera ==
The family Emmelichthyidae contains the following three genera:

- Emmelichthys Richardson, 1845
- Erythrocles Jordan, 1919
- Plagiogeneion Forbes, 1890

The three genera include a combined 18 species.

== Characteristics ==
Emmelichthyidae are streamlined fishes with much of their heads and bodies covered in small ctenoid scales which also extend on the base of both the dorsal and anal fin. They have distensible jaws and large mouths with the maxillae widely expanded and clearly scaled. The lower jaw protrudes slightly and the teeth highly reduced or there are none at all. The rear margin of the operculum has a pair of flat spines. The dorsal fin is long and may be divided into two fins with the anal fin being similar and opposite the soft-rayed portion of the dorsal fin. The caudal fin has a deep fork. Typically these fish do not exceed 50 cm (20 in) in length. Emmelichthyidae are usually bright shades of red, orange, and pink.

== Distribution ==
Emmelichthyidae are deep-water fish distributed in tropical and warmer temperate waters in the Indian, southern Pacific, and eastern Atlantic Oceans and the Caribbean Sea.

== See also ==
- List of fish families
