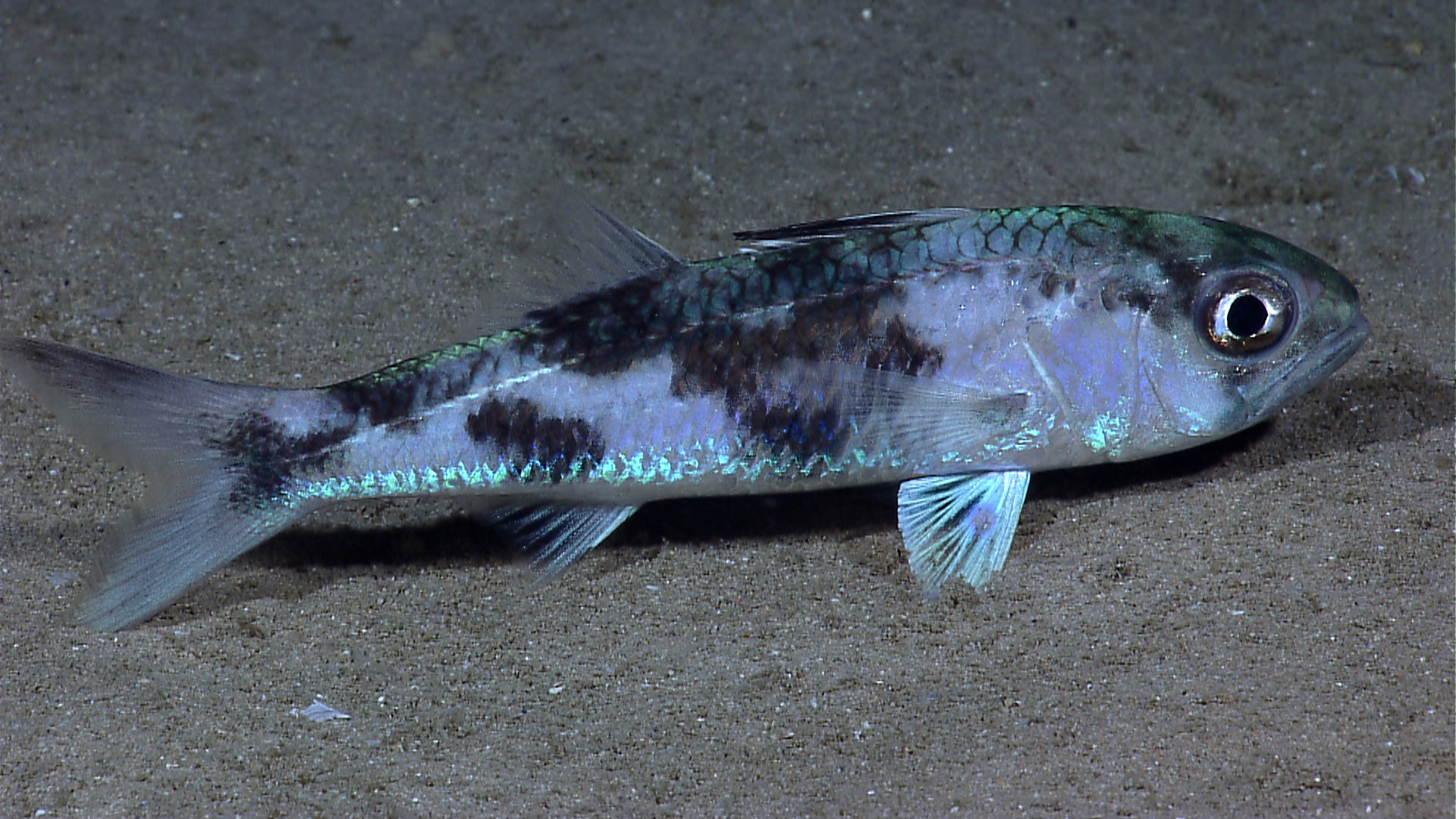
- Synagrops bellus

Scientific classification
- Kingdom: Animalia
- Phylum: Chordata
- Class: Actinopterygii
- Division: Teleostei
- Order: Acropomatiformes
- Family: Acropomatidae; T. N. Gill, 1893

Genera
- See text

= Acropomatidae =

Acropomatidae Temporal range: 55.5–0 Ma Early Eocene to Present

Family of ray-finned fishes

Acropomatidae is a family of ray-finned fish in the order Acropomatiformes, commonly known as lanternbellies. Acropoma species are notable for having light-emitting organs along their undersides. They are found in all temperate and tropical oceans, usually at depths of several hundred meters. There are about 32 species in as many as 9 genera, although some authorities recognise fewer genera than Fishbase does.

Members of the family are generally small, with some ranging up to 40 cm, but most no more than 15 cm. They have two dorsal fins, the first with seven to 10 spines and the second with possibly a spine in addition to eight to 10 soft rays. The anal fin has two or three spines, and the pelvic fins one spine and five soft rays.

== Genera ==
The following two genera are currently placed within the family Acropomatidae, based on the Catalog of Fishes:

- Acropoma Temminck & Schlegel, 1843
- Doederleinia Steindachner, 1883

The 5th edition of Fishes of the World lists seven valid genera, but these have since been moved to other families within the order.

== Taxonomy ==
The Acriopomatidae is placed in the order Perciformes, the suborder Percoidei and the superfamily Percoidea in the 5th edition of Fishes of the World. However, during the 21st Century molecular studies have indicated that a variety of mainly deep-sea fishes which were traditionally placed in the Perciformes, including the Acropomatidae, and in the Trachiniformes in fact from a newly recognised clade which has been named either the Acropomatiformes or Pempheriformes. Within the Acropomatidae phylogenetic work has suggested that the genera Acropoma and Doederleinia are separate from the other genera in the traditional arrangement of the family with two other recognised lineages being placed in the separate families Malakichthyidae and Synagropidae.

This classification would be as follows:

- Acropmatidae
  - Acropoma
  - Doederleinia
- Malakichthyidae
  - Apogonops
  - Neoscombrops
  - Malakichthys
  - Verilus
- Synagropidae
  - Caraibops
  - Kaperangus
  - Parascombrops
  - Synagrops
