= Phanaeng =

Thick, salty, sweet red Thai curry paste

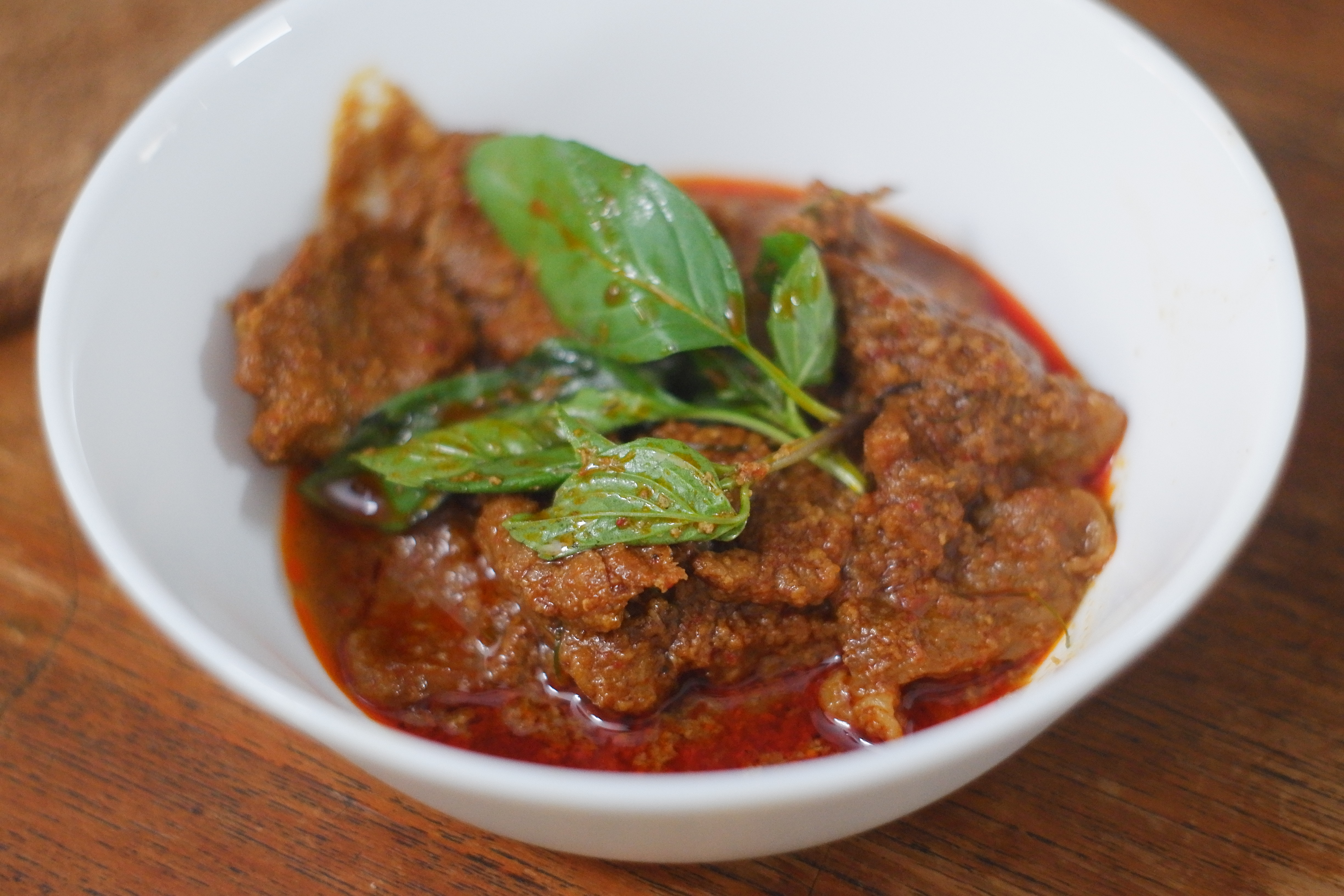
- Pork phanaeng
- Alternative names: Panang, panaeng
- Type: Curry
- Place of origin: Thailand
- Serving temperature: Hot
- Main ingredients: Dried chili peppers, galangal, lemongrass, makrut lime zest, coriander root, coriander seeds, cumin seeds, garlic, shallot, shrimp paste, salt and peanuts

Phanaeng (also panang or panaeng; Thai: พะแนง) is a type of Thai curry distinguished by its thick, creamy texture and by a mildly sweet, aromatic flavor. The dish originated in central Thailand, and is typically prepared with a red curry–based paste cooked in coconut cream until the oils separate, creating a rich sauce that coats the meat. Common featured proteins include beef, chicken, or pork, complemented by kaffir lime leaves, fish sauce, and palm sugar.

Modern versions of Phanaeng are known for their subtle nutty undertone, sometimes derived from ground peanuts, although historical recipes—such as those documented by Thai culinary researchers—often omit peanuts and feature a less sweet, more spice-forward profile. (Note: Peanuts are not native to Thailand, but originated in South America.) Older preparations may also involve techniques like grilling the meat before simmering, reflecting traditional regional cooking practices. Today, Phanaeng remains a popular Thai curry both within Thailand and internationally.

== Phanaeng curry paste ==
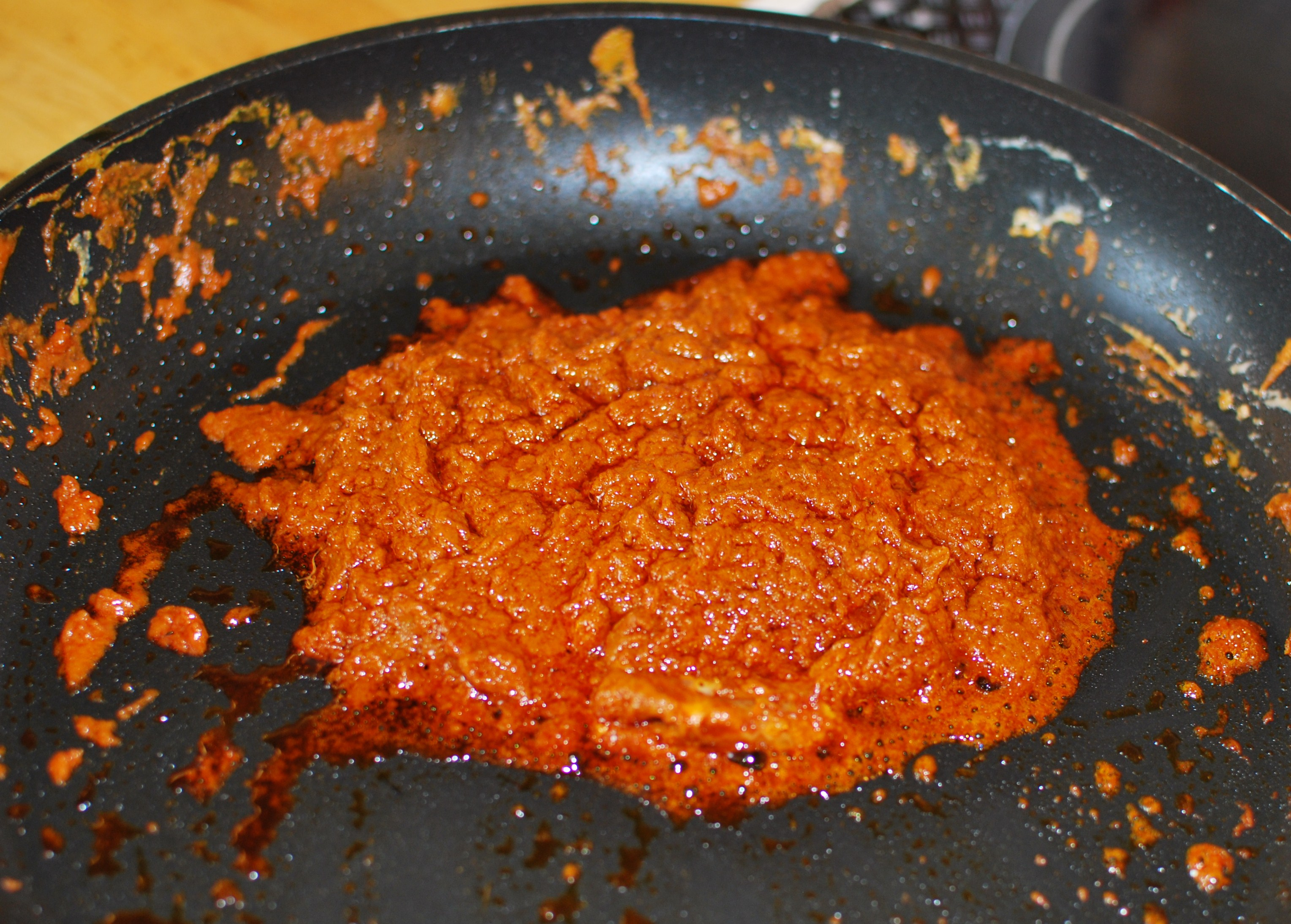
Phanaeng curry paste is fried with coconut cream to make the curry more creamy in taste.

The curry paste is made with dried chili peppers, galangal, lemongrass, makrut lime zest, coriander root, coriander seeds, cumin seeds, garlic, shallot, shrimp paste, salt and peanuts. The dish is usually made with meat cut into thin strips, makrut lime leaves, coconut milk, phanaeng curry paste, palm sugar and fish sauce. It typically contains thick coconut milk and has very little other liquid added.

== History ==
The exact origin of phanaeng curry is still unknown, although most sources can be traced back to the central region of Thailand in the early Rattanakosin era. Early Thai cookbook Tam Raa Kap Khao (ตำรากับข้าว), printed in 1889, already mentioned kai phanaeng (ไก่พะแนง). This dish is said to have originated in that era. This curry is rich in flavor, made with coconut milk, and has a slightly sweet taste. It was later prepared in the palace style before becoming a popular dish in restaurants throughout Thailand.

Some food writers believe phanaeng is influenced by trade and cultural contact with Malaysia. This is noticeable by the use of roasted peanuts and the similarity between the name of this dish and the Malaysian island of Penang. However, other researchers argue that its main ingredients—coconut milk, fish sauce, and Thai curry paste—show a distinctly Thai origin and culinary identity.

In the late twentieth century, phanaeng became widely known outside of Thailand due to the increasing popularity of Thai restaurants abroad.

== Etymology ==
The word phanaeng (พะแนง) is believed from the Thai adaptation of the Malay word panggang, meaning “grilled.” That suggests this dish has referred is grilled or roasted meat cooked with curry paste before evolution to the thick coconut milk curry known today. In Thai words, “panang” refers to a curry dish characterized by smooth texture and subtle sweetness rather than cooking method. Its linguistic origins still unknown, but cultural organizations such as the Thai Foundation say "phanaeng" has a distinctly Thai identity and flavor.

== Preparation ==
=== Ingredients ===
Phanaeng uses a rich curry paste and coconut milk as its main ingredients. The curry paste traditionally includes dried red chilies, lemongrass, galangal, garlic, shallots, coriander root, and shrimp paste, all pounded until smooth. Modern recipes may add kaffir lime peel or ground roasted peanuts to enhance the nutty flavor and aroma, which may be found in some regions.

Coconut milk is essential for cooking and a source of sweetness and fat. Palm sugar gives a mild caramel note that balances the saltiness of fish sauce, while kaffir lime leaves and sliced red chilies give fragrance and color. Phanaeng is thus different from spicier Thai curries like kaeng phet (red curry).

Meat such as beef, pork, or chicken is most often used, though seafood versions exist.

=== Preparation ===
The first step is to stir-fry the curry paste in thick coconut milk until fragrant and the oil separates. This is an important step that intensifies the color and flavor. Then add the meat to absorb the spice mixture, followed by the addition of coconut milk to create the base sauce. Then simmer the soup until thick and the meat is tender. Finishing touches often include finely shredded kaffir lime leaves and a drizzle of coconut milk for gloss and aroma.

Home cooks maintaining balance,the sauce must be thick but smooth, sweet but slightly salty. Phanaeng is milder and richer than red or green curry, because it has more coconut milk and a lower ratio of chilies. Some recipes use ground peanuts for added texture, a popular method in Western-style Thai restaurants.

=== Serving and flavor ===
Phanaeng is often served with steamed jasmine rice, jasmine rice absorbs the thick sauce and balances the dish creamy intensity. It is eaten both at home and in restaurants, often appears as a standalone curry or larger Thai meal. The flavor is sweet, nutty, mildly spicy, and aromatic, which makes it one of the most accessible Thai curries worldwide.

In restaurants, chefs may enhance their visual appeal with coconut or thin chili strips, while homemade versions highlight simplicity and comfort. Phanaeng is regarded as an everyday “comfort curry” that shows the harmony of Thai food, including sweet, salty, and rich flavors.

== Variations ==
=== Meat-based ===
Phanaeng is most commonly prepared with beef, pork, or chicken, as these proteins are traditionally associated with the dish throughout Central Thailand. Beef creates a deeper and richer sauce, pork creates a natural sweetness and tenderness, and chicken creates a lighter and more delicate flavor. Among these, pork phanaeng is often regarded as the classic preparation in the region; it appears in both royal recipes and modern home cooking.

=== Vegetarian and seafood ===
Vegetarian adaptations of phanaeng use soy sauce instead of fish sauce and use tofu, mushrooms, and plant-based proteins instead of meat, which makes a milder flavor while preserving the aromatic qualities of the curry paste. Coastal areas, influenced by local seafood availability, frequently incorporate shrimp, fish, or crab, which made flavor lighter, brinier versions that contrast with the richer meat-based curries. These variations reflect the flexibility and adaptability of Thai curry culture, which naturally shifts with local ingredients and regional tastes.

=== Regional differences ===
In Southern Thailand, phanaeng is usually spicier and more aromatic, often using stronger curry pastes and higher chili content, reflecting the region’s bolder culinary traditions. By contrast, Northern Thailand versions are typically milder and sweeter, aligning with local preferences for less chili heat and a more subtle coconut-based flavor.

=== International adaptations ===
Outside Thailand, phanaeng is frequently adapted for convenience, with many home cooks and restaurants using canned or ready-made curry paste and reducing chili levels to accommodate local tastes. Western restaurants may also add more vegetables.

== Similar dishes ==
Phanaeng has many similarities with other coconut-based or mildly spiced curries across Asia. Even though comes from its own cultural background, they share cooking methods, ingredients, flavor profile, making them useful comparison points when studying Thai curry traditions.

=== Massaman curry (Thailand) ===
Massaman curry is one of the closest dish to Phanaeng, because both menus have a strong, slightly spicy flavor and contain coconut milk. Massaman uses peanuts or cashews, giving a rich, nutty flavor, similar to the sweetness that the signature of phanaeng. The main difference lies in the flavor of the spices. Massaman curry uses spices from Persia and India, such as cardamom, cinnamon, and cloves, which give a warmer and more aromatic flavor.

=== Rendang (Malaysia) ===
Malaysian beef rendang is similar to Phanaeng in its use of slow-cooked beef, coconut-rich base, and aromatic herbs such as galangal, lemongrass, and kaffir lime leaves. Unlike Phanaeng, rendang is cooked until it is almost dry, leaving a caramelized layer of spices instead of a creamy sauce, and the flavor is also more savory and less sweet.

=== Gulai (Indonesia) ===
Indonesian gulai is a coconut-milk-based curry that often uses beef or chicken, which makes it somewhat similar to Phanaeng. Both dishes use galangal, lemongrass, and other Southeast Asian aromatics, but gulai usually has more turmeric and a wider mix of spices. This gives it a stronger, more intensely spiced flavor and makes it less sweet than Phanaeng.

=== Korma (India) ===
Indian korma is a mild, creamy curry that is often compared to phanaeng because both they use nuts or dairy, such as almonds, cashews, or cream, to create a rich texture. However, korma does not usually include Southeast Asian herbs like lemongrass or kaffir lime leaf, even though its sweetness and gentle spice level are quite similar to phanaeng’s flavor profile.

=== Ohn no khao swè (Myanmar) ===
Ohn no khao swè is a Burmese noodle dish made with a mild, creamy coconut broth that can be compared to phanaeng curry, since both use coconut milk and light spices instead of strong chili heat

== Nutritional content and health benefits ==
Phanaeng curry is a calorie-dense dish that provides protein from the meat and a large amount of energy from the coconut-milk base. Nutritional studies show that it is high in total fat and saturated fat, which is expected given its rich and creamy texture. Coconut milk, an essential ingredient, contains lauric acid and medium-chain triglycerides, that may support certain metabolic functions, but it also raises overall fat intake, so eating it in moderation is recommended. The herbs and spices used in the curry paste—such as lemongrass, galangal, kaffir lime leaf, garlic, and chilies—provide antioxidants and bioactive compounds that support digestion and help reduce inflammation, adding extra nutritional value to the dish beyond its basic macronutrients.
