= Kaeng phrik kraduk mu =

Variety of Thai curry

Kaeng phrik kraduk mu (Thai: แกงพริกกระดูกหมู, pronounced [kɛ̄ːŋ pʰrík krā.dùːk mǔː]) is a variety of Thai curry from the areas of southern Thailand. It is similar to Kaeng pa in that it usually contains no coconut milk, but uses turmeric instead of galangal. Kaeng phrik kraduk mhu is popular in Southern Thailand.
