= Evil jungle prince =

Thai-style dish originating in Hawaiʻi

- Alternative names: evil prince tofu
- Course: entrée
- Place of origin: Honolulu
- Region or state: Hawaiʻi
- Associated cuisine: Thai, Hawaiʻian
- Created by: Keo Sananikone
- Invented: 1977
- Main ingredients: tofu or chicken
- Ingredients generally used: chili peppers, lemongrass, makrut lime leaves, coconut milk, fish sauce, sweet basil, cabbage

Evil jungle prince is a Thai-inspired dish which was created in Hawaiʻi in 1977 by Laotian American Keo Sananikone for his Mekong restaurant in Honolulu. Later versions by Sananikone included other proteins. Sananikone also created the evil princess, but that is a cocktail and not a related dish.

The dish has been replicated in other restaurants, as far away as Vermont.

== Name ==
The 'evil' part of the name comes from the hot chili peppers used in the dish. The 'jungle' part of the name has been linked to the dish's similarity to kaeng pa, or jungle curry, although the latter typically does not contain coconut milk.

Other names for the dish include loving jungle prince.
