= Phat phrik khing =

Thai curry, fried in oil without coconut milk

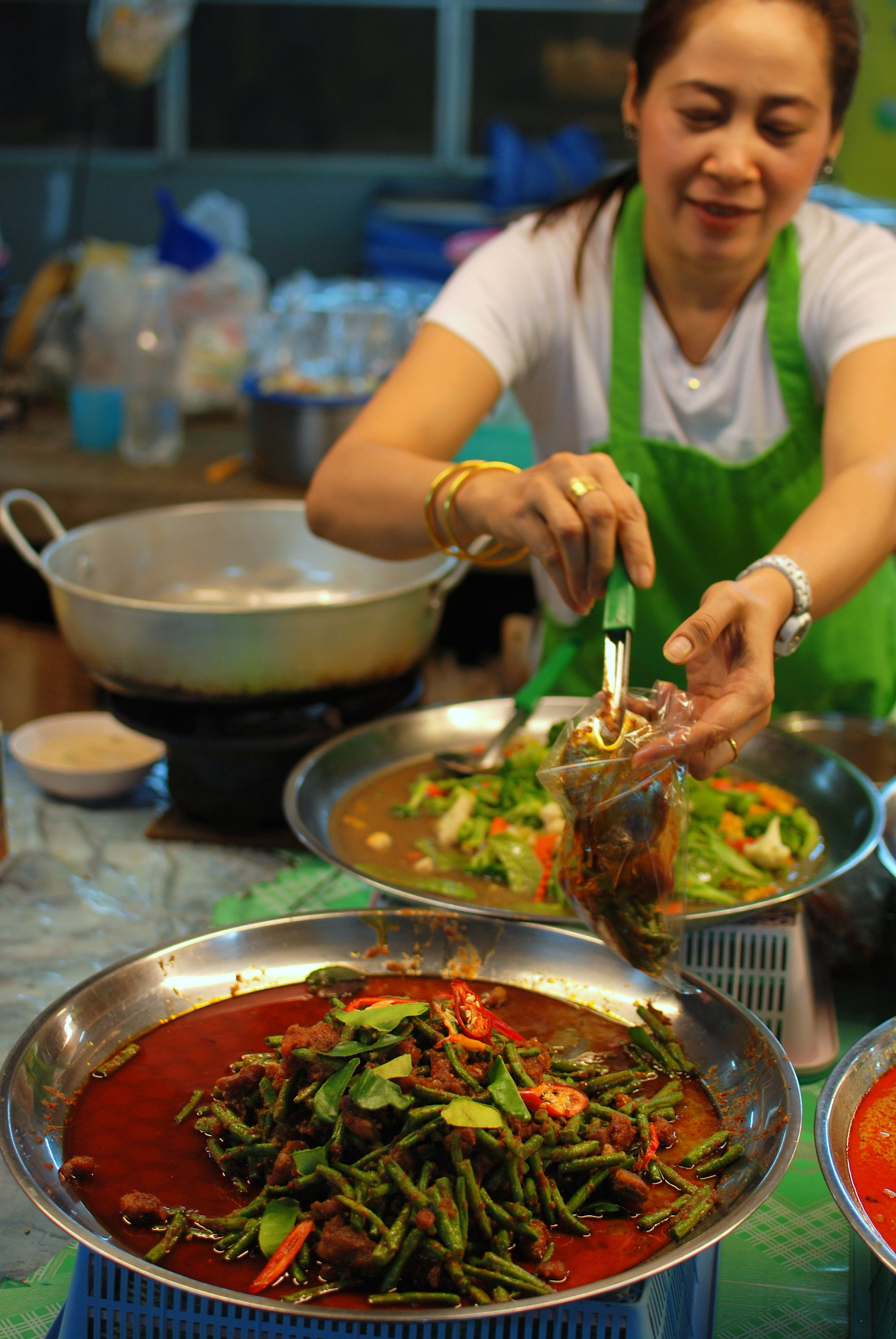
- Mu phat phrik khing - Pork and yardlong beans fried in phrik khing paste, with kaffir lime leaves
- Alternative names: Pad prik king
- Type: Curry
- Course: Lunch, dinner
- Place of origin: Thailand
- Region or state: Southeast Asia
- Created by: Thai people
- Main ingredients: Yardlong bean or green bean, chili peppers, lemongrass, garlic, and galangal

Phat phrik khing or pad prik king (Thai: ผัดพริกขิง, pronounced [pʰàt pʰrík kʰǐŋ]) is a type of Thai curry that is drier than other Thai curries such as red curry as it is fried in oil and does not contain liquid coconut milk. Sometimes, instead of, or in addition to frying oil, coconut milk is heated until it turns to oil for added taste.

The paste is a thick curry presenting a vivid red color due to phrik (chili peppers). Confusingly, the Thai name indicates that ginger (khing) is used in this dish, which in fact is not the case. Recipes for the phrik khing curry paste usually include lemongrass, garlic and galangal. Very often, also in Thailand, red curry paste is used instead.

== Ingredients ==
The curry is mainly made of Yardlong bean or green bean, chili peppers, lemongrass, garlic, galangal and the main protein, traditionally diced pork belly, or chicken.

Palm sugar, dried fish, and fish sauce are added depending on the preference.

== Nutrition ==
The dish is a blend of proteins, greens and carbohydrates, being a fairly balanced meal.

On average, each serving has around 250-380 calories.

== See also ==
- Thai curry
- Phat khing
