= Thai curry =

Dishes in Thai cuisine made with curry paste

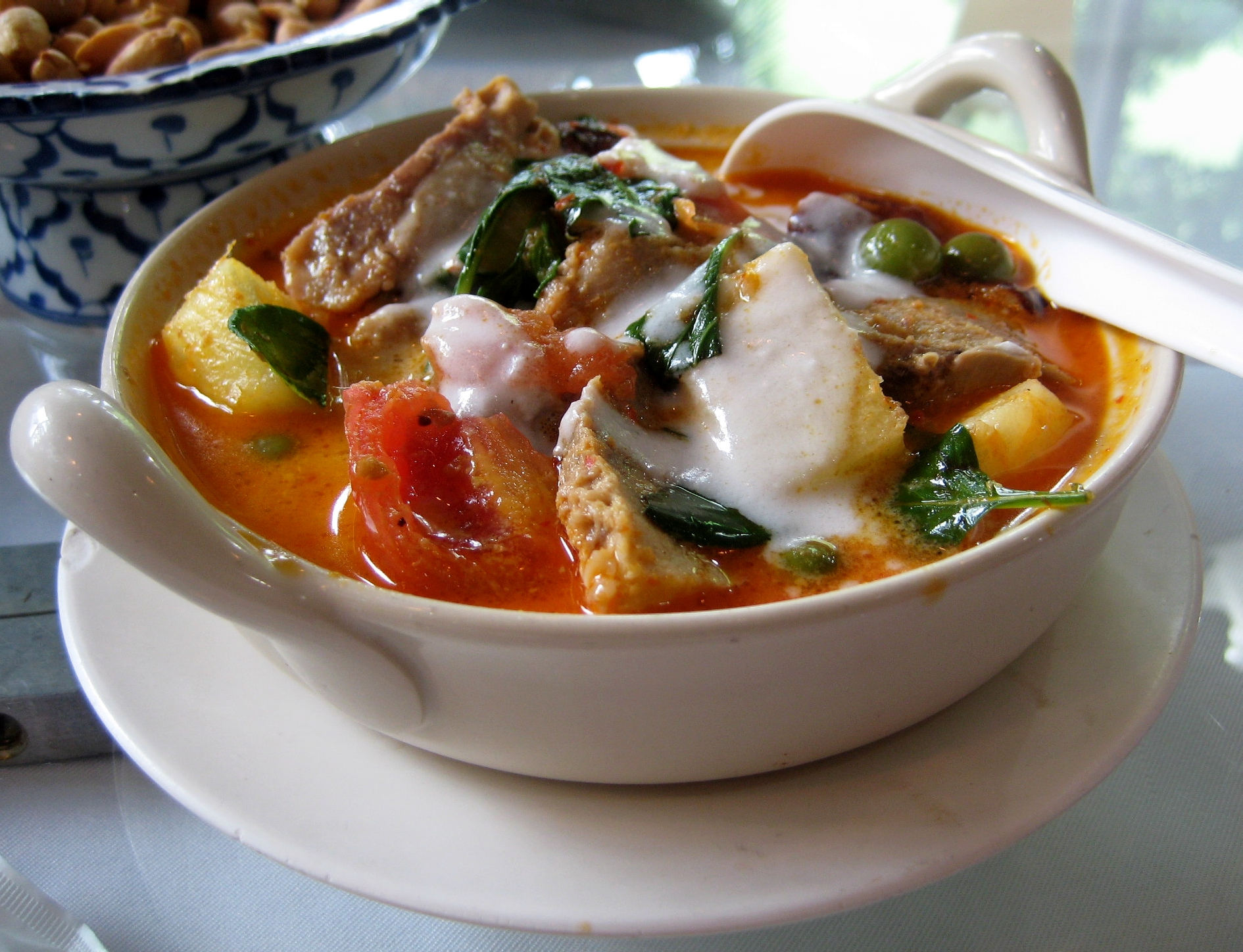
- A bowl of kaeng phet pet yang, roast duck in red curry
- Type: Curry
- Place of origin: Thailand
- Main ingredients: Curry paste; coconut milk or water; meat; seafood; vegetables or fruit; herbs

Thai curry (Thai: แกง, romanized: kaeng, pronounced [kɛ̄ːŋ]) is a dish in Thai cuisine made from curry paste, coconut milk or water, meat, seafood, vegetables or fruit, and herbs. Curries in Thailand mainly differ from the Indian subcontinent in their use of ingredients such as fresh rhizomes, herbs, and aromatic leaves rather than a mix of dried spices.

== Definition ==
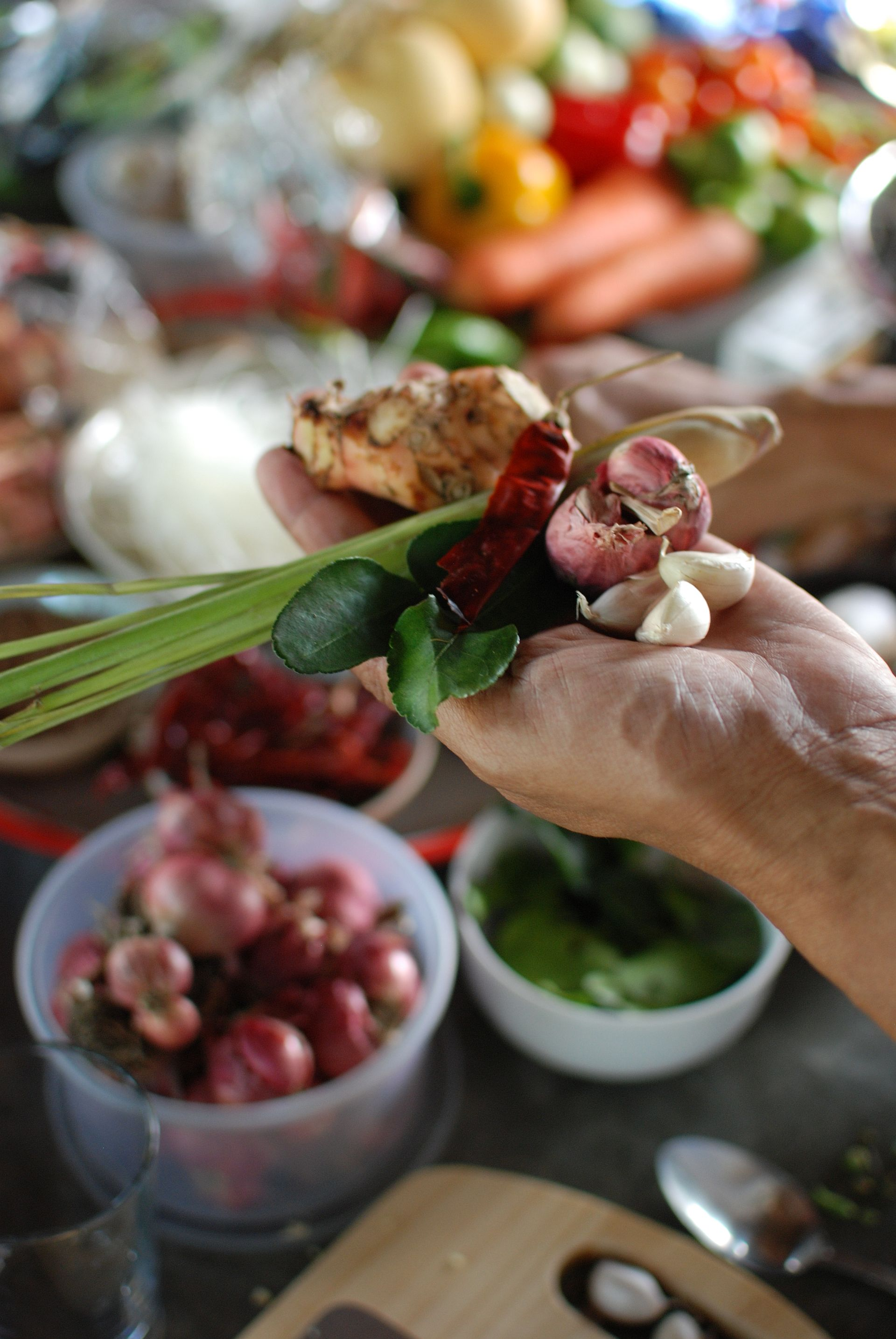
Some of the fresh ingredients for red curry paste

The first Thai dictionary from 1873 CE (2416 in the Thai Buddhist calendar) defines kaeng as a watery dish to be eaten with rice and utilizing shrimp paste, onions or shallots, chillies, and garlic as essential ingredients. Coconut milk is not included in this definition and many Thai curries, such as kaeng som and kaeng pa, do not feature it. Curries in Lanna (northern Thai) cuisine, with only a few exceptions, do not use coconut milk due to coconut palms not growing well, if at all, in the climate of the Thai highlands. The spiciness of Thai curries depends on the amount and kind of chilli used in the making of the paste. Even within one type of curry the spiciness can differ widely.

The word "curry" figures in the Thai language as "kari" (Thai: กะหรี่), and refers to dishes using either an Indian-style curry powder, known as phong kari in Thailand, or to the dish called kaeng kari, an Indian-influenced curry that is made with spices that are common to Indian dishes but less often used in these proportions in Thai cuisine. Kung phat phong kari (prawns fried with egg and curry powder) is an example of a dish using the Indian style curry powder.

Although "kaeng" is also defined as being of "watery" substance, the thickness of the sauce can vary considerably from broth-like to that of a thick stew, and it can even be a completely dry dish. Representatives of dry curries, dishes which are (stir-)fried with a curry paste, are phat phrik khing and khua kling. Kaeng som and keang pa are representatives of the more broth-like curries. Matsaman and kaeng khua resemble stews. Ho mok pla (a steamed fish curry), kaeng kradang (curry aspic from northern Thailand) and noodle dishes such as khanom chin nam ngiao are also seen as Thai curry dishes as they all use curry pastes in their preparation.

The dish called kaeng chuet is an exception to the rule that a kaeng should contain chillies, garlic, onions and shrimp paste. It is a clear Chinese-style meat and/or vegetable broth with mixed vegetables and often also minced pork, tofu and glass noodles. The name translates as "bland curry" but it is seen as being a tom, a soup, and it is therefore also often called tom chuet.

Curries are eaten in combination with rice, the long-grained jasmine rice in central and southern Thailand and sticky rice in northern and northeastern Thailand, and with noodles such as khanom chin (fermented rice noodles). Certain curries can also be eaten with roti, the Thai version of the Indian-style fried flat bread from Malaysia called roti canai.

Khao kaeng or khao rat kaeng, meaning "curry-on-rice", is a traditional type of fast food restaurant in Thailand which specialises in ready-made curries, and often several other dishes as well, served with rice. Their popularity in Bangkok as a place for a quick lunchtime meal is in decline.

== Typical ingredients ==
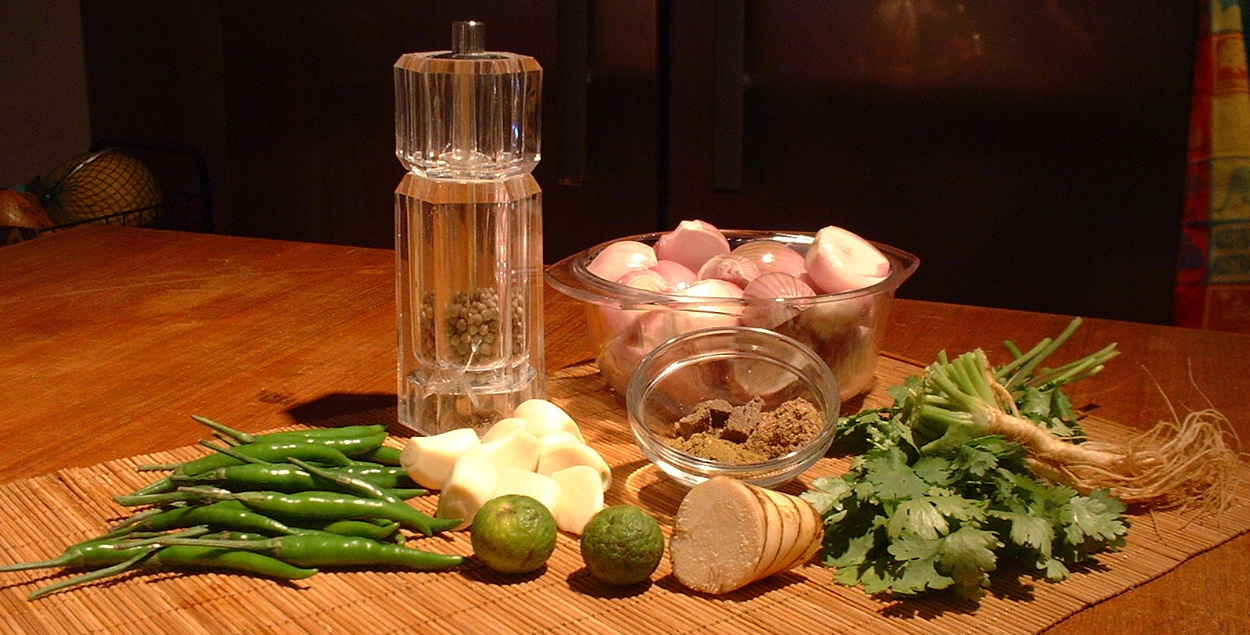
Ingredients for green curry

=== Curry paste ===
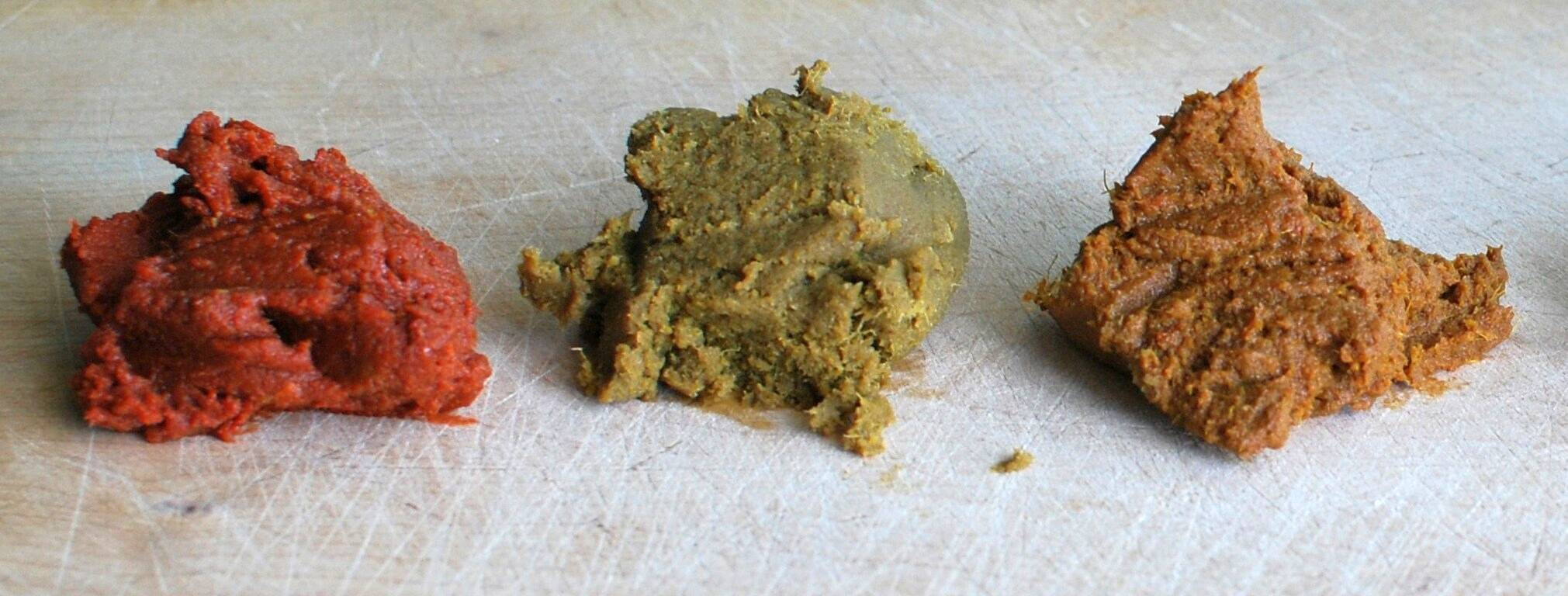
Red, green and yellow Thai curry pastes

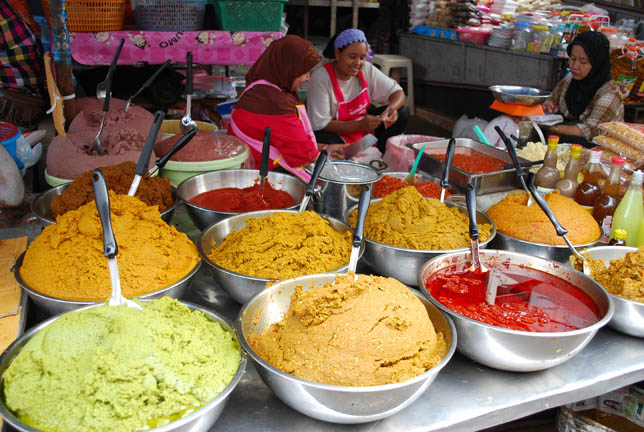
Different types of Thai curry pastes for sale at a market in Hat Yai, in southern Thailand

Thai curries (khrueang kaeng, lit. 'kaeng ingredients', and nam phrik kaeng, lit. 'kaeng chilli paste') are always made with a curry paste. Common ingredients used in many Thai curry pastes include shrimp paste, fresh or dried red or green chillies, onions or shallots, garlic, lemongrass, galangal, and coriander (cilantro) root.

Depending on the type of curry, additional ingredients for the paste can include spices such as turmeric, pepper, coriander seeds, cardamom pods, and cumin, or other ingredients such as boiled fermented fish, and fingerroot. Ingredients are traditionally ground together with a mortar and pestle, though increasingly with an electric food processor. With many curries, the paste is first stir-fried in cooking oil before other components are added in to the dish. This allows certain flavours in the spices and other ingredients in the paste to develop that cannot be released at the lower temperature of boiling water.

Thai curry pastes can be made at home from the bare ingredients, bought freshly made at markets in Thailand, or they can be had packaged at shops and supermarkets.

=== Main ingredients ===
Most Thai curries are made with meat, fish or shellfish as their main ingredient. Vegetables and fruit, but also certain tree leaves such as from the Acacia pennata (cha-om) and the Ficus virens (phak lueat), and flowers such as those of the Sesbania grandiflora (dok khae) and banana (hua pli), can be added. Curries that contain mainly vegetables are, for example, kaeng liang (mixed vegetables) and kaeng nomai (bamboo shoots). Ingredients were dictated by regional and seasonal availability: both pork and chicken (possibly first domesticated from wild jungle fowl in what is now Thailand) are easily available, and so are many varieties of fish, and shellfish, both fresh water species from the many rivers, lakes and rice paddies, as well as salt water species from the Andaman Sea and the Gulf of Thailand. Other traditional ingredients in Thai curries include frogs, snakes, snails, wild birds and game such as Sambar deer and wild boar. Commonly used vegetables in curries are Thai eggplant (makhuea pro), yardlong beans (thua fak yao), and different types of squash and pumpkins (fak).

=== Additional ingredients ===
Fresh kaffir lime leaves (bai makrut), fingerroot (krachai), or fresh herbs such as Thai basil (horapa) are often added to Thai curries. Kaffir lime leaves and krachai are often cooked along with the other ingredients but fresh herbs such as Thai basil are nearly always added at the last moment to preserve the full taste and serve as a contrasting note to the flavours of a curry. Fish sauce is not only used when cooking the curry as a flavouring and for its salty taste, but it is usually also available at the table as a condiment, mixed together with sliced green bird's-eye chillies for those that prefer their curries more salty and spicy. Sugar (traditionally palm sugar) is used with curries that need to be sweetened. Besides lime juice, tamarind juice can also see use in sour curries as the souring agent such as in kaeng som. To achieve the most fragrance from the ingredients in a curry paste, the curry paste is often first fried together with vegetable oil or coconut oil that has separated from the coconut cream, before adding in the other ingredients.

== Popular Thai curries ==
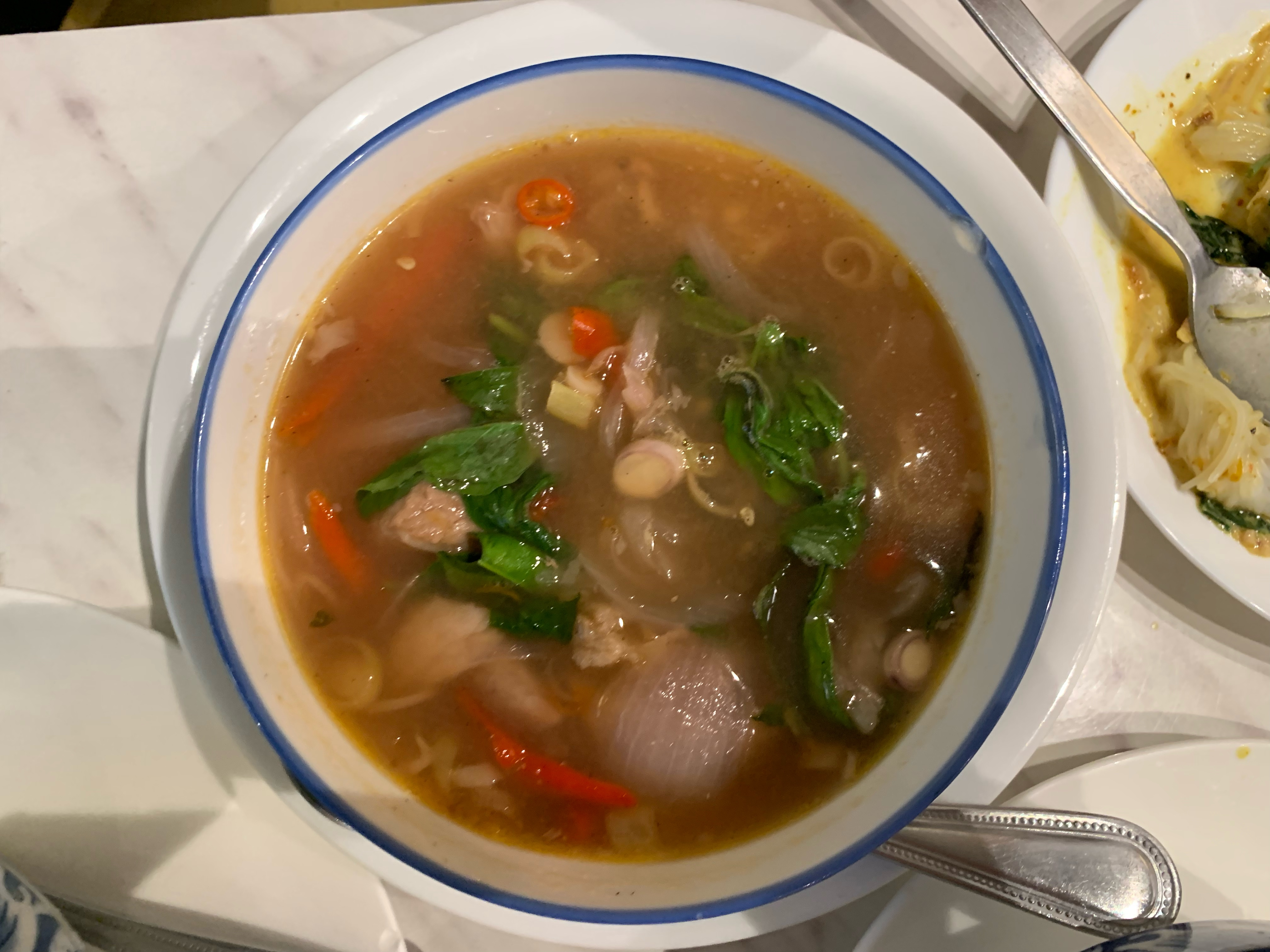
Kaeng ranjuan

- Kaeng kari (lit. '"curry" curry', known as "yellow curry" in the West)
- Kaeng khae, a northern Thai curry
- Kaeng khiao wan (lit. 'green sweet curry', known as "green curry" in the West)
- Kaeng pa (lit. 'jungle curry', in addition to the curry paste, it uses whatever is available in nature)
- Kaeng phet (lit. 'spicy curry', known as "red curry" in the West)
- Kaeng som (lit. 'orange curry', every region has its own variety)
- Kaeng thepho (a curry with pork belly, originally made with thepho fish)
- Kaeng matsaman (lit. 'Muslim curry')
- Kaeng ranjuan (a leftover food with spicy, sour, sweet, and salty beef curry seasoned with no more than fermented shrimp paste chili sauce)
- Khao soi (a Burmese-influenced curry noodle soup from northern Thailand)
- Phanaeng (possibly referring to the Malaysian island state of Penang; a creamy and generally mild curry)
- Phat phrik khing (lit. 'stir-fried chilli ginger', though it contains no ginger)

== Gallery ==
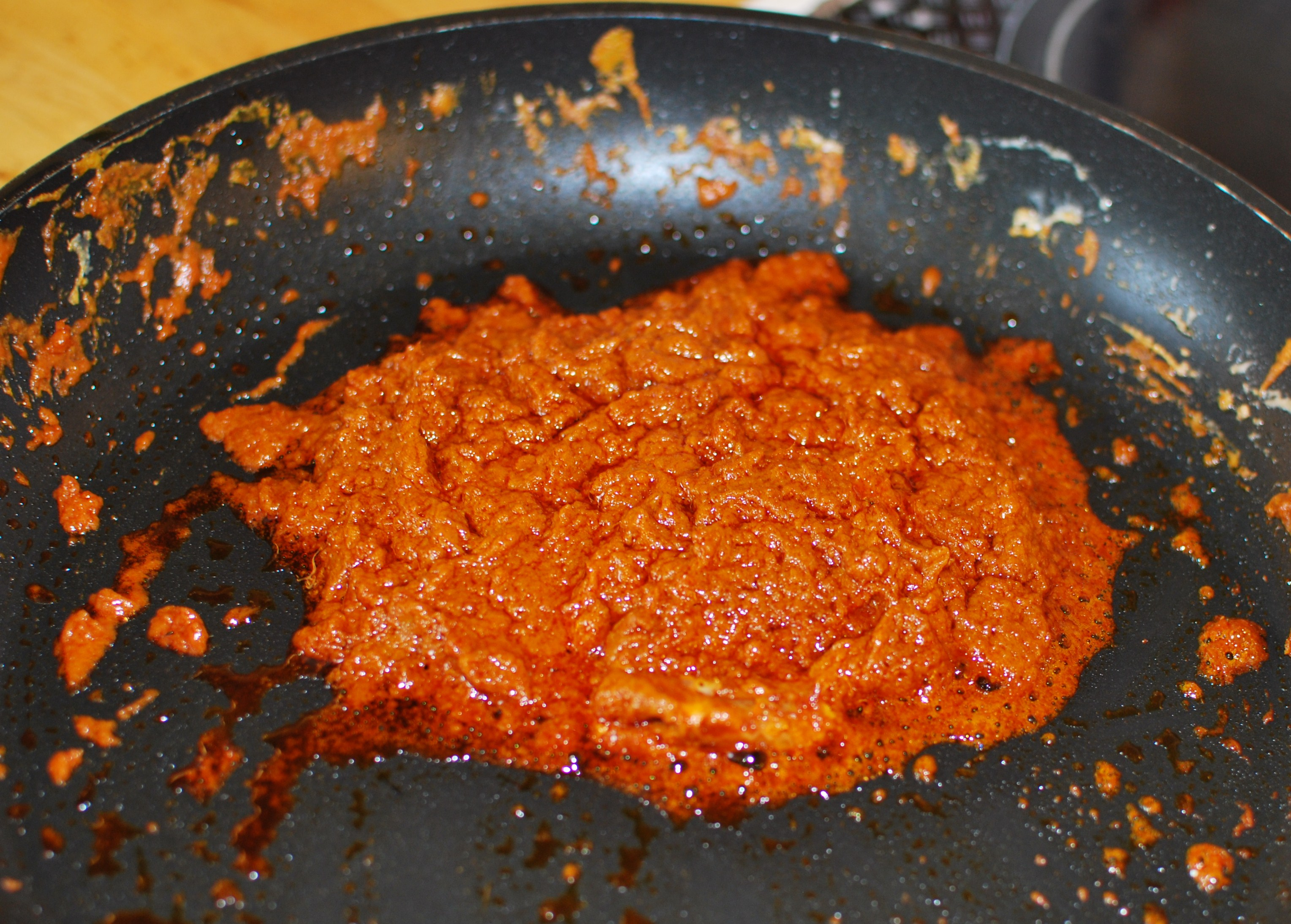
Phanaeng paste is fried together with coconut cream

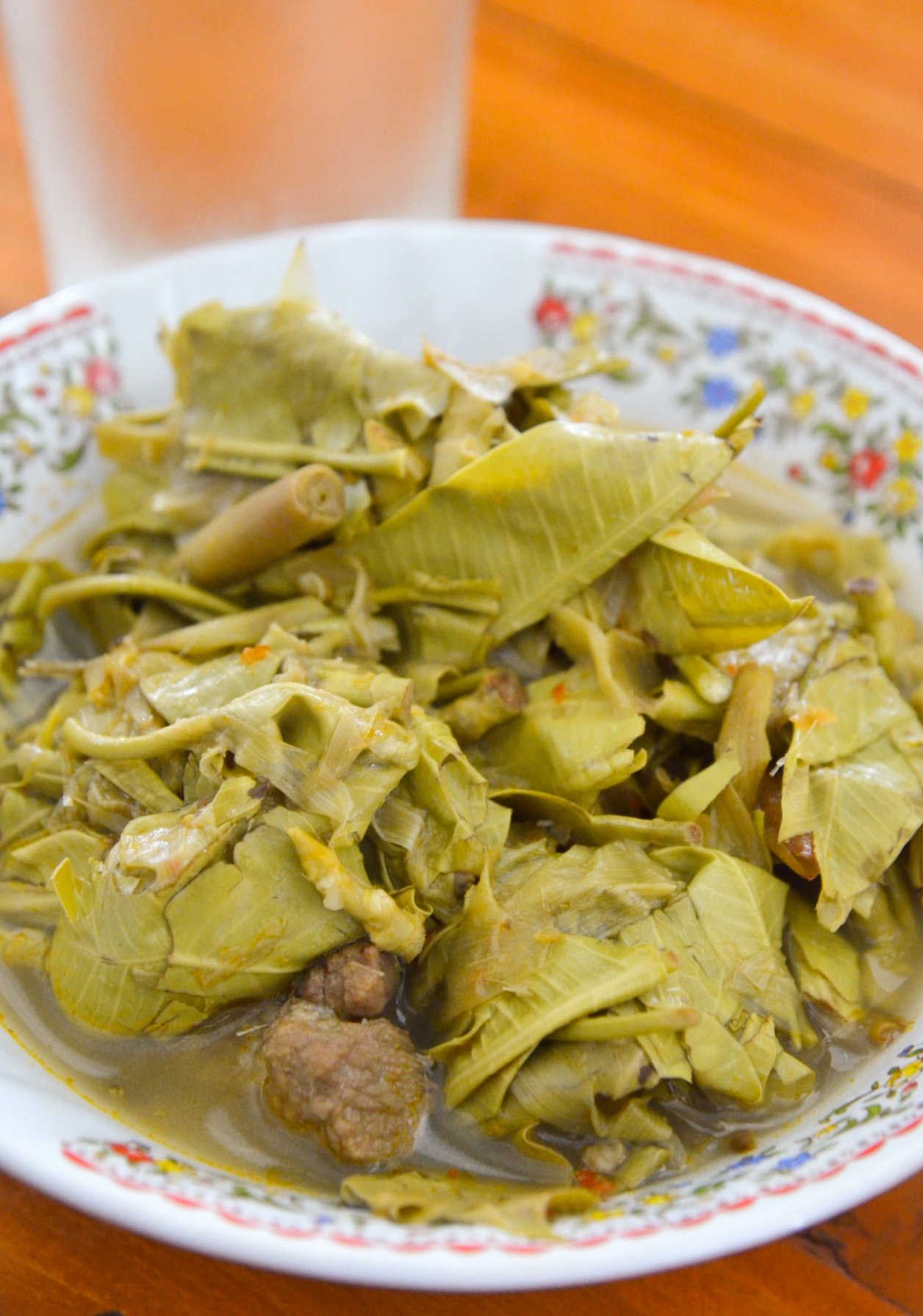
Kaeng phak lueat, a northern Thai curry with ficus leaves

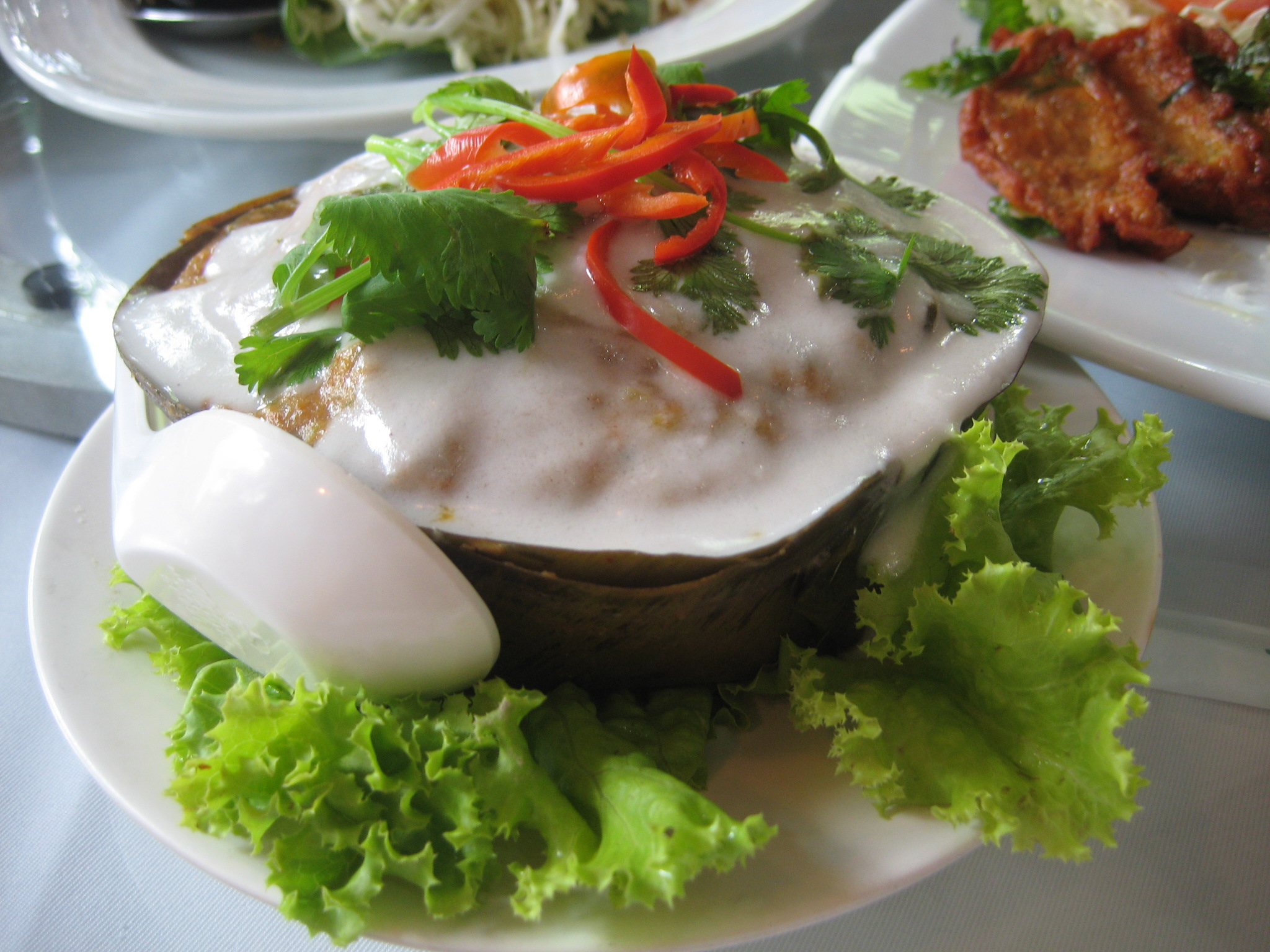
Ho mok pla, steamed fish curry

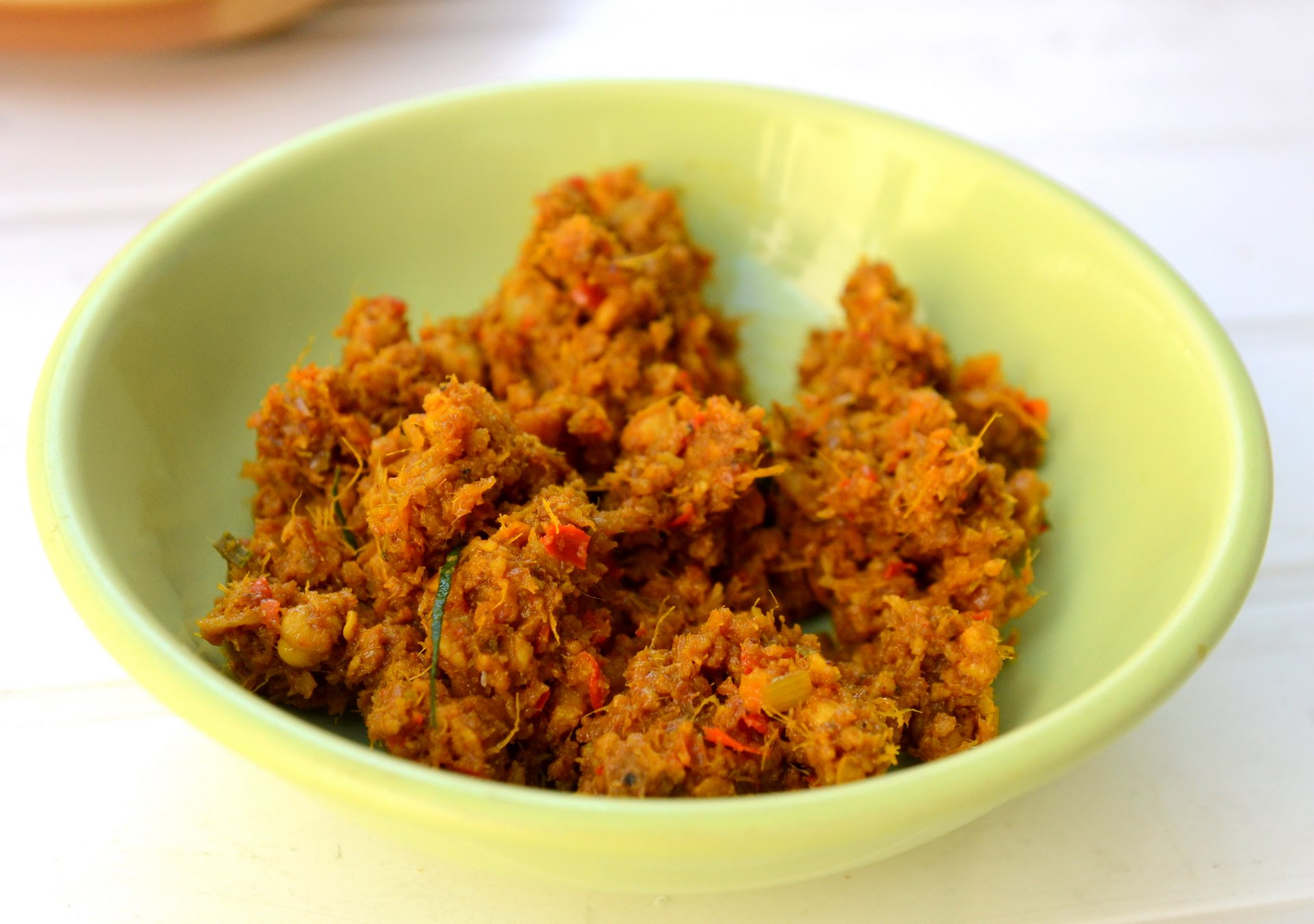
Khua kling, an extremely spicy, dry fried curry from southern Thailand

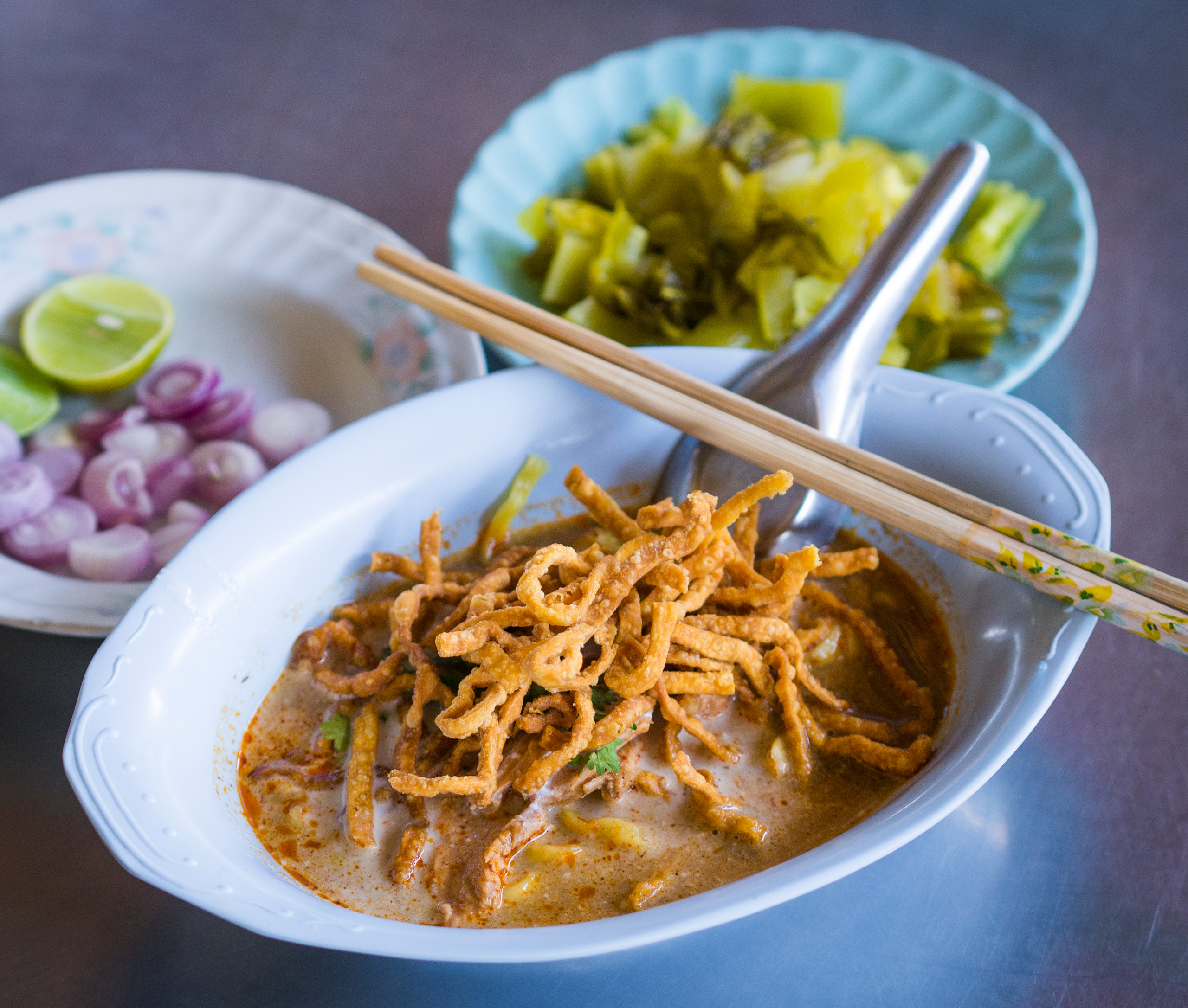
Khao soi, a curry noodle soup from northern Thailand

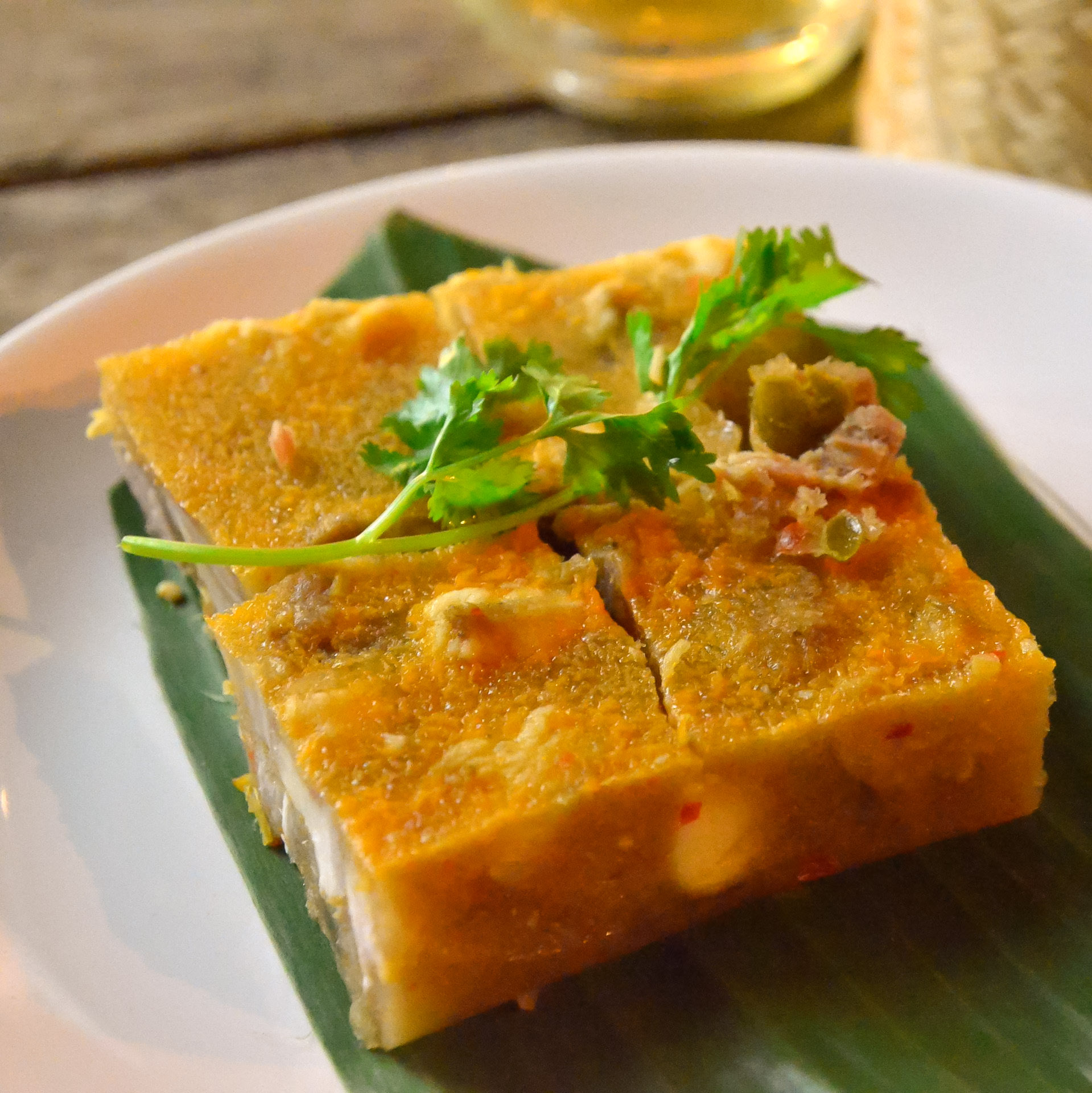
Kaeng kradang, a pork curry aspic

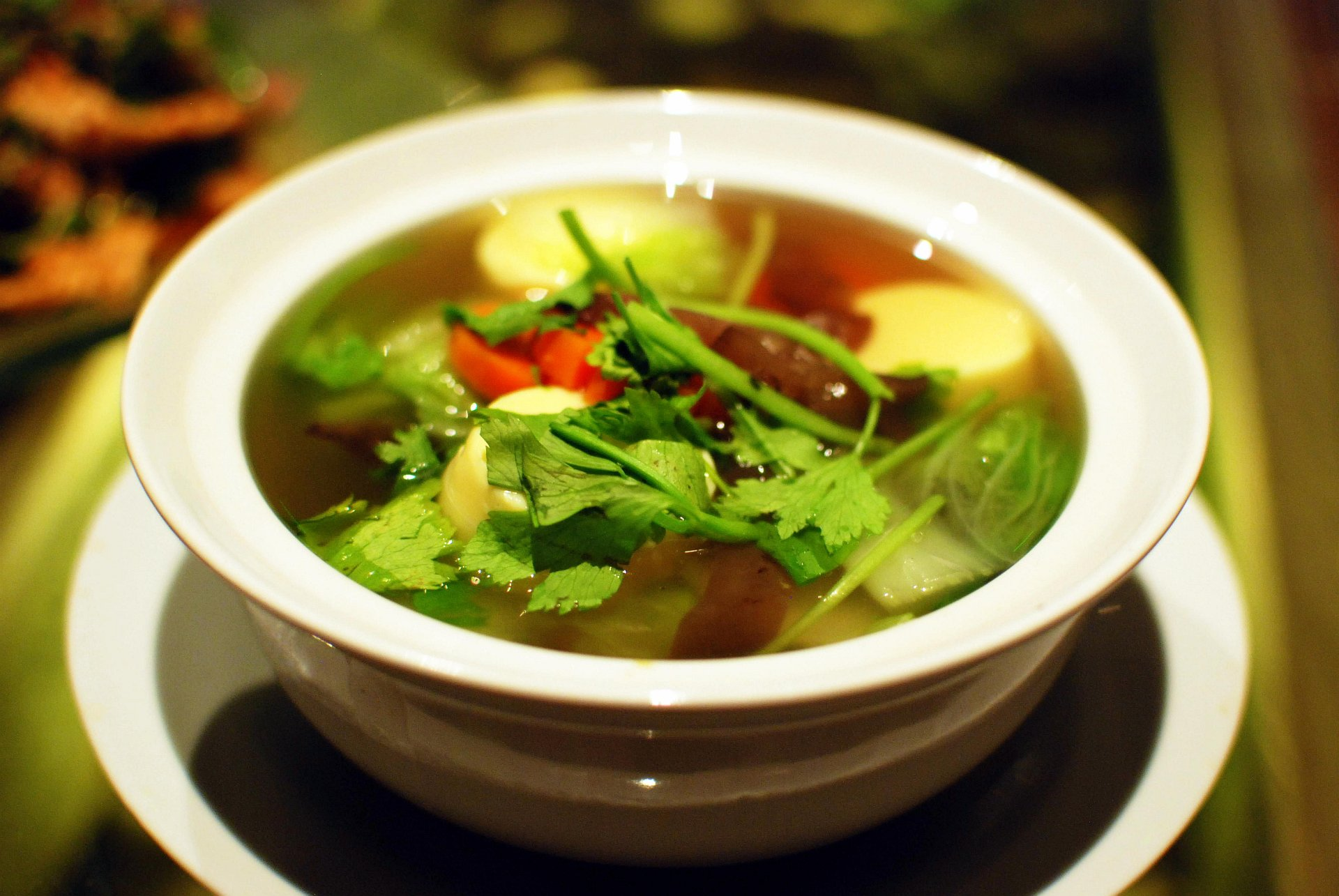
Kaeng chuet, not actually a curry but a soup

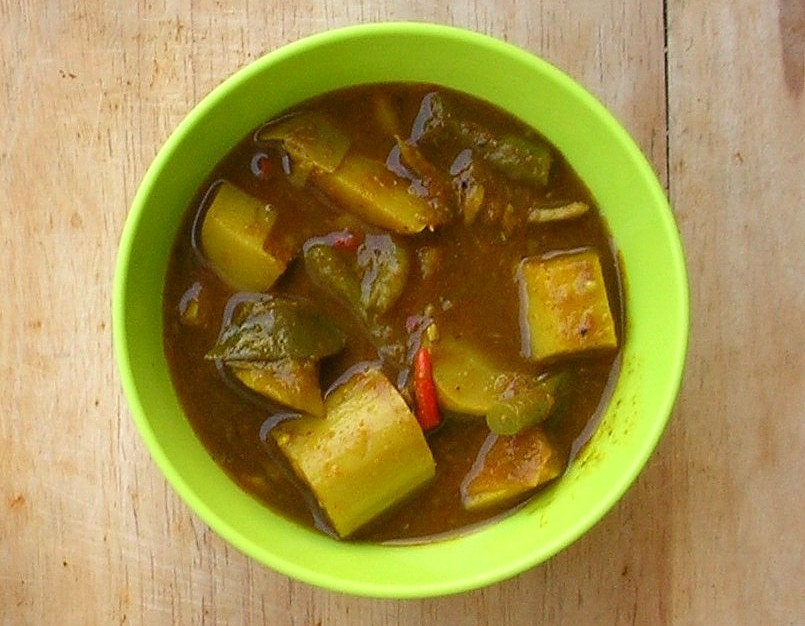
Kaeng tai pla, made from fermented fish entrails

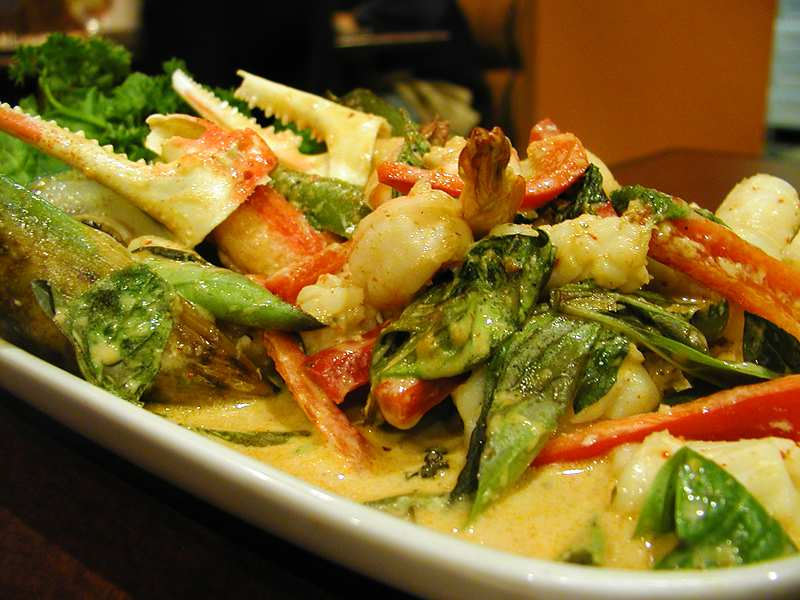
A seafood curry in the United States inspired by the flavors of Thai cuisine

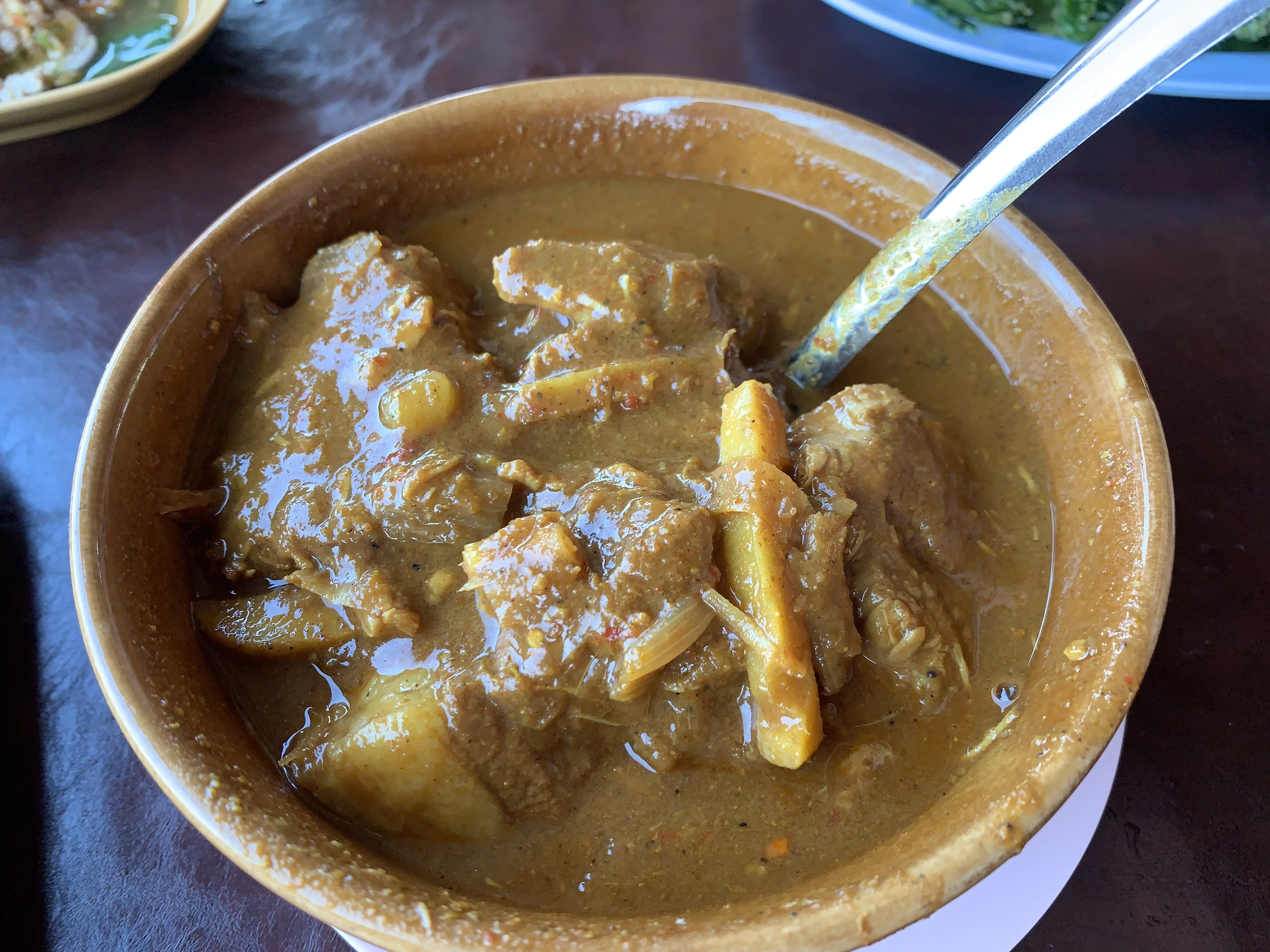
Kaeng hang le, a northern Thai curry with Burmese influences

== See also ==
- Curries in List of Thai dishes
- Kroeung
- Gulai
