= Yellow curry =

Variety of curry

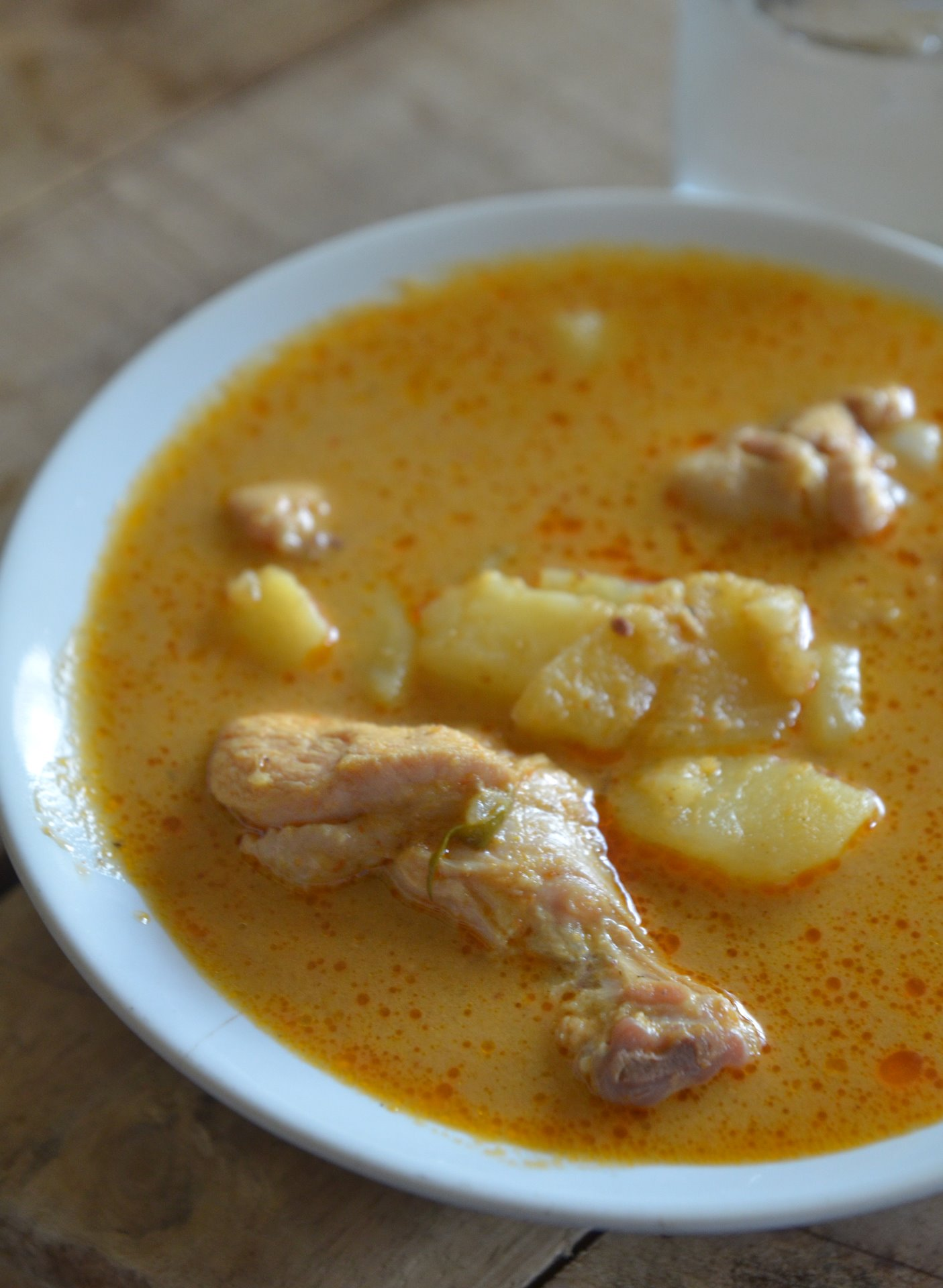
- Yellow curry with chicken and potatoes
- Alternative names: Kaeng Lueang
- Type: Thai curry
- Place of origin: Southern Thailand
- Main ingredients: cumin; coriander; turmeric; fenugreek; garlic; salt; bay leaf; lemongrass; cayenne pepper; ginger; mace; cinnamon

Yellow curry, known in Thai as kaeng kari (Thai: แกงกะหรี่, lit. 'curry curry', pronounced [kɛ̄ːŋ kā.rìː]) is a Thai dish made from cumin, coriander, turmeric, fenugreek, garlic, salt, bay leaf, lemongrass, cayenne pepper, ginger, makrut lime, mace and cinnamon. It is generally milder than other Thai curries, being that it contains less chilli.

== Thai cuisine ==
It is one of three major kinds of Thai curry that are commonly found in Thai restaurants in the West. There are other curry types in Thai cuisine, several of which are yellow. Pre-packaged curry powder of Indian origin is sometimes also referred to as yellow curry in Western countries but is a different blend of spices from Thai yellow curry. Thai yellow curry, outside Thailand, usually refers to the dish kaeng kari.

Thai yellow curry is most typically served with chicken or beef and a starchy vegetable, most often potatoes, but it can be made with duck, tofu, shrimp, fish, or vegetables and is eaten with steamed rice or round rice noodles known as khanom chin.

== See also ==
- Thai curry
- List of Thai dishes
