= Red curry =

Thai dish

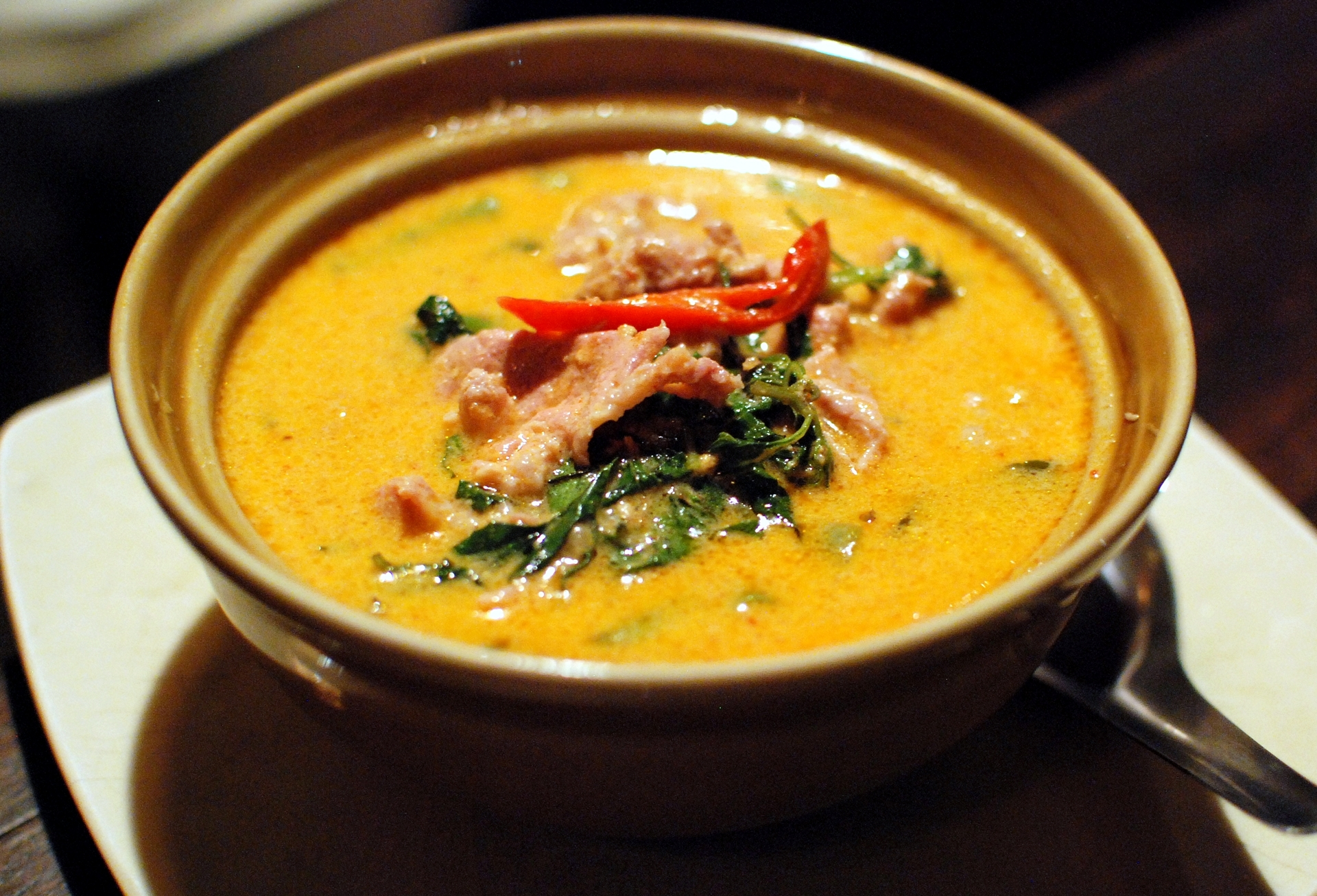
- Red curry with pork
- Alternative names: Kaeng phet
- Type: Thai curry
- Place of origin: Thailand
- Serving temperature: Hot
- Main ingredients: Curry paste; (garlic; shallots; (dried) red chili peppers; galangal; shrimp paste; salt; kaffir lime peel; coriander root; coriander seed; cumin seeds; peppercorns; lemongrass); coconut milk

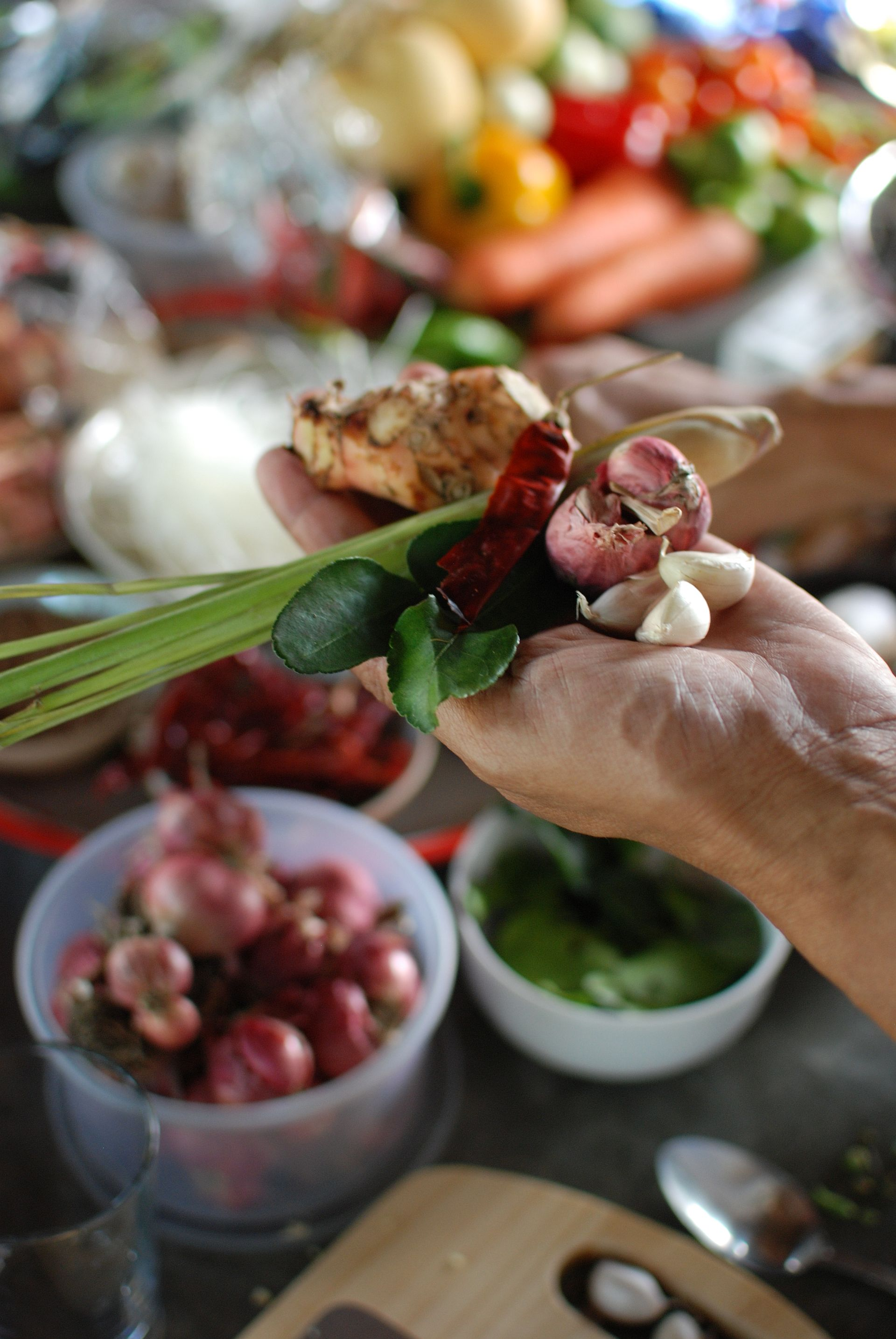
Some of the ingredients for the paste

Red curry (Thai: แกงเผ็ด, RTGS: kaeng phet, pron. [kɛːŋ pʰèt], lit. 'spicy curry') is a Thai dish consisting of red curry paste cooked in coconut milk with meat such as chicken, beef, pork, duck or shrimp added, or else a vegetarian protein source such as tofu.

== Red curry paste ==
The base Thai red curry paste (Thai: พริกแกงเผ็ด, RTGS: phrik kaeng phet) is traditionally made with a mortar and pestle, and remains moist throughout the preparation process. The red coloring is derived from dry red spur chillies (Thai: พริกแห้งเม็ดใหญ่, RTGS: phrik haeng met yai) – which is dried phrik chi fa red chilies. The main ingredients include (dried) red chili peppers, garlic, shallots, galangal, shrimp paste, salt, makrut lime leaves, coriander root, coriander seeds, cumin seeds, peppercorns and lemongrass. Today, the prepared Thai red curry pastes are available at markets produced in mass quantities, and also available in bottles and jars produced by some brands.

== Ingredients and preparation ==
The prepared red curry paste is cooked on a saucepan with cooking oil, to which coconut milk is added. Then the meat as protein source is added into the curry-base soup. Various kinds of meats are used in red curry, such as chicken, beef, pork, shrimp, and duck, and exotic meats such as frog and snake meats. The most common, however, are chicken, pork and beef. The meat is cut into bite-sized pieces. Common additives are fish sauce, sugar, chopped makrut lime leaves, Thai eggplant, bamboo shoots, and Thai basil (bai horapha).

Tofu, meat analogues or vegetables such as pumpkin can be substituted as a pseudo-vegetarian option, but due to the presence of shrimp paste in curry paste, substituting protein does not make the dish vegetarian. There are, however, vegetarian red curry pastes available.

This dish normally has a soup-like consistency and is served in a bowl and eaten with steamed rice.

Red curry paste itself is the core flavouring for a number of other dishes such thot man pla (fish cakes) and sai ua (grilled Chiang Mai sausage).

== See also ==
- Coconut soup
- Thai curry
- Green curry
- Massaman curry
