= Massaman curry =

Mild Thai curry

Massaman-curry
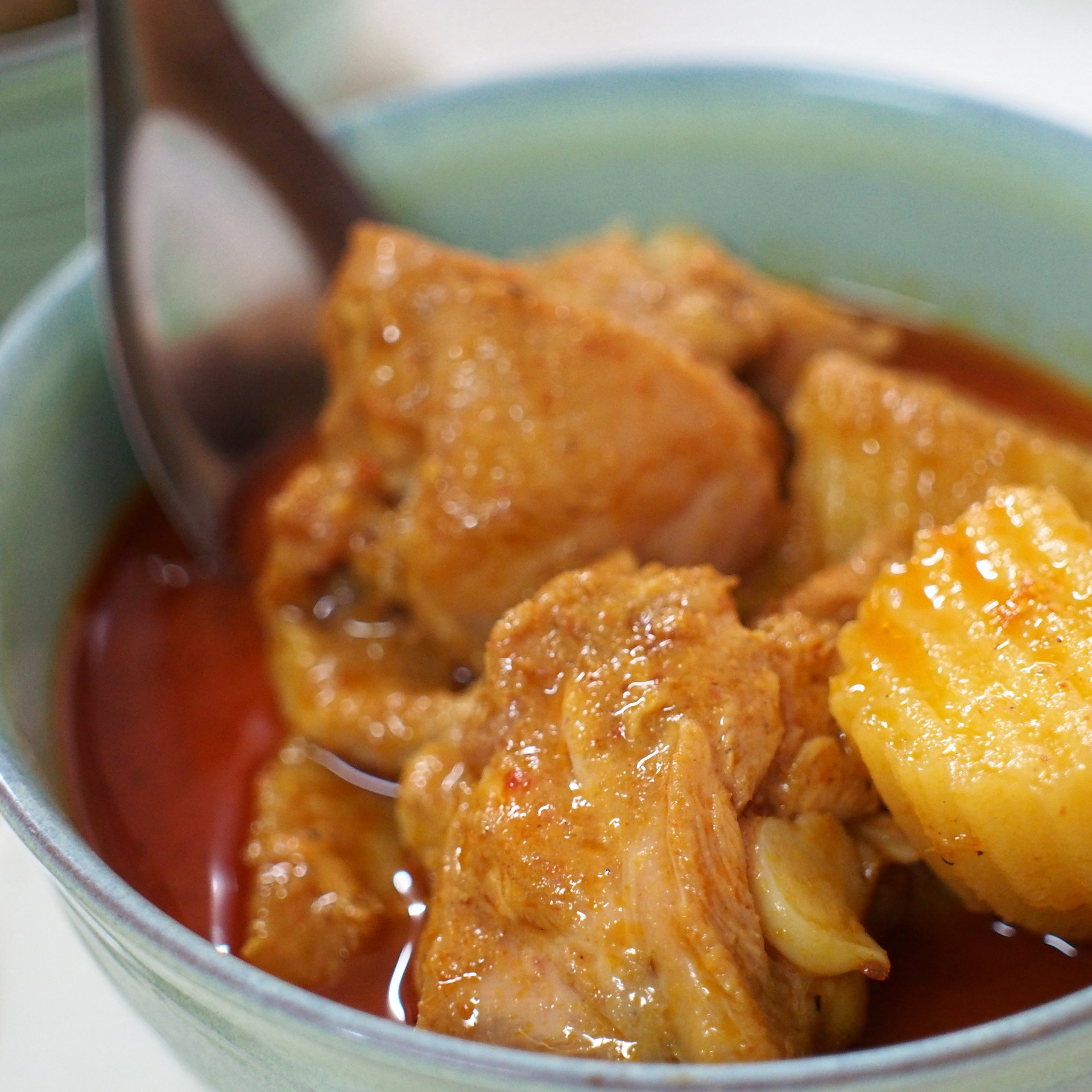
- Chicken massaman with potato
- Type: Curry
- Place of origin: Thailand
- Main ingredients: Meat (duck, chicken or beef) or tofu, coconut milk, onion, peanuts or cashews, potatoes, bay leaves, cardamom pods, cinnamon, star anise, palm sugar, fish sauce, chili and tamarind juice
- Similar dishes: Saraman curry

Massaman curry (Thai: แกงมัสมั่น, RTGS: kaeng matsaman, pronounced [kɛ̄ːŋ mát.sā.màn]) is a Thai dish consisting of potatoes, onions, peanuts, and massaman curry paste cooked in coconut milk, generally with chicken added. It is a fusion dish, combining foreign ingredients from three regions — Persia, India, and the Malay Archipelago (e.g., cardamom, cinnamon, cloves, star anise, cumin, bay leaves, nutmeg, and mace) — with ingredients more commonly used in native Thai cuisine (e.g., chili peppers, coriander, lemongrass, galangal, white pepper, shrimp paste, shallots, and garlic) to make massaman curry paste. The substance of the dish is usually based on chicken, potatoes, onions, and peanuts. The richness comes from the coconut milk and cream used as a base, as for many Thai curries.

== Description ==
This curry is most commonly made with chicken, but there are also variations on this dish using duck, beef, venison, mutton, goat. Pork is sometimes used, but is rare due to the dish's Muslim roots and the fact that pork is haram (forbidden) in Islam. Correspondingly, this last variant is not eaten in the present-day by observant Thai Muslims. Vegetarians and vegans have created their own versions of this dish, such as by using tofu and substituting any shrimp paste or fish sauce used.

The Muslim roots of the dish are evident in many of the flavors of the massaman curry paste (nam phrik kaeng matsaman) that come from spices not frequently used in other Thai curries. Cardamom, cinnamon, cloves, star anise, cumin, bay leaves, nutmeg and mace would, in the 17th century, have been brought to Thailand from the Malay Archipelago and South Asia by foreigners, a trade originally dominated by Muslim traders from the Middle East, India, and from the archipelago itself, but increasingly undertaken by the Portuguese, the Dutch, and the French East India Company.

These foreign spices and flavors are then combined with local produce and flavors commonly used in native Thai cuisine such as dried chili peppers, coriander seeds, lemongrass, galangal, white pepper, shrimp paste, shallots, and garlic to make the massaman curry paste.

The curry paste is first fried with coconut cream, and only then are meat, potatoes, onions, fish sauce or salt, tamarind paste, sugar, coconut milk and peanuts added. Massaman is usually eaten with rice together in a meal with other dishes. There are also traditional versions using oranges, orange juice, or pineapple juice as additional ingredients.

== History ==
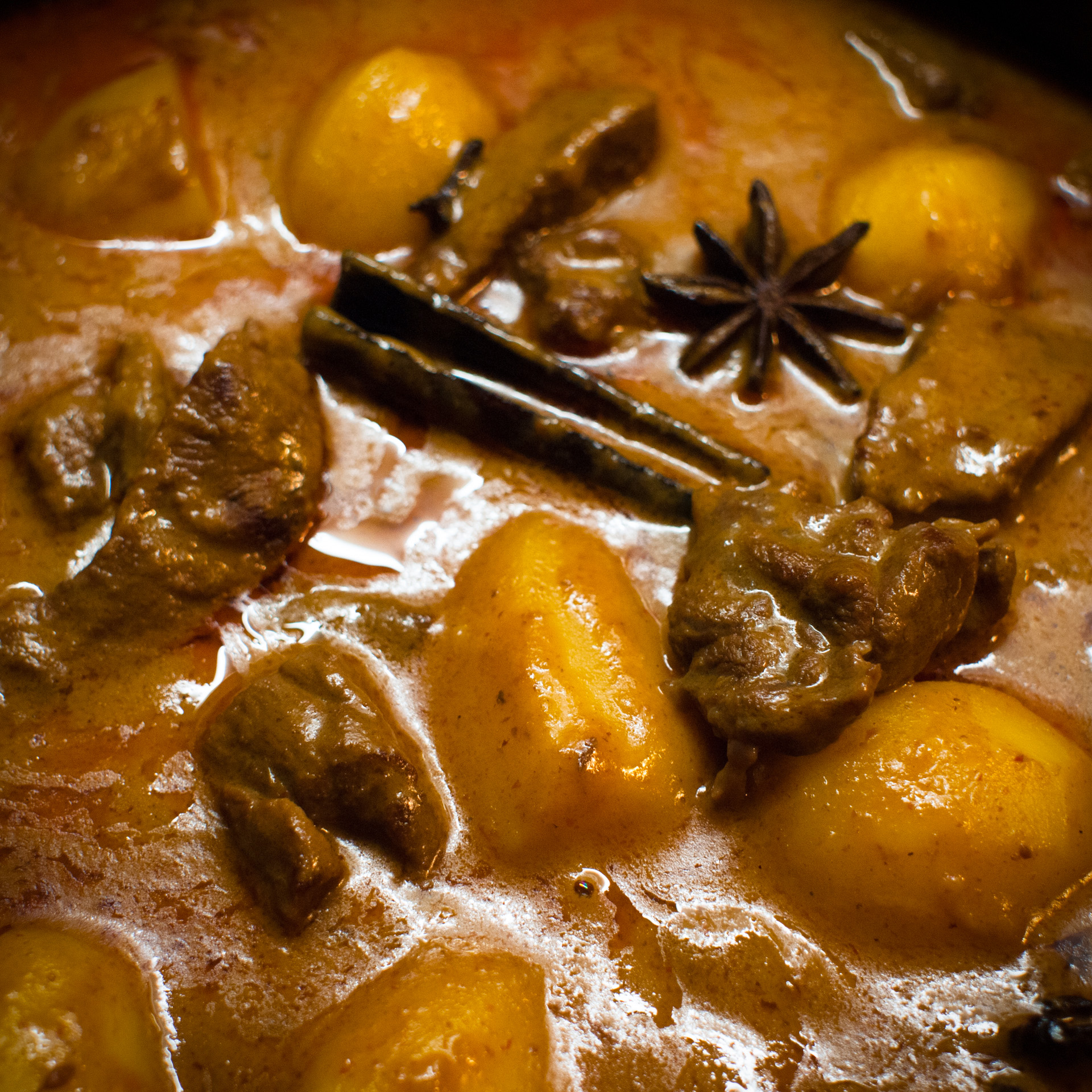
Matsaman nuea (beef massaman) with potato, star anise, cinnamon and clove

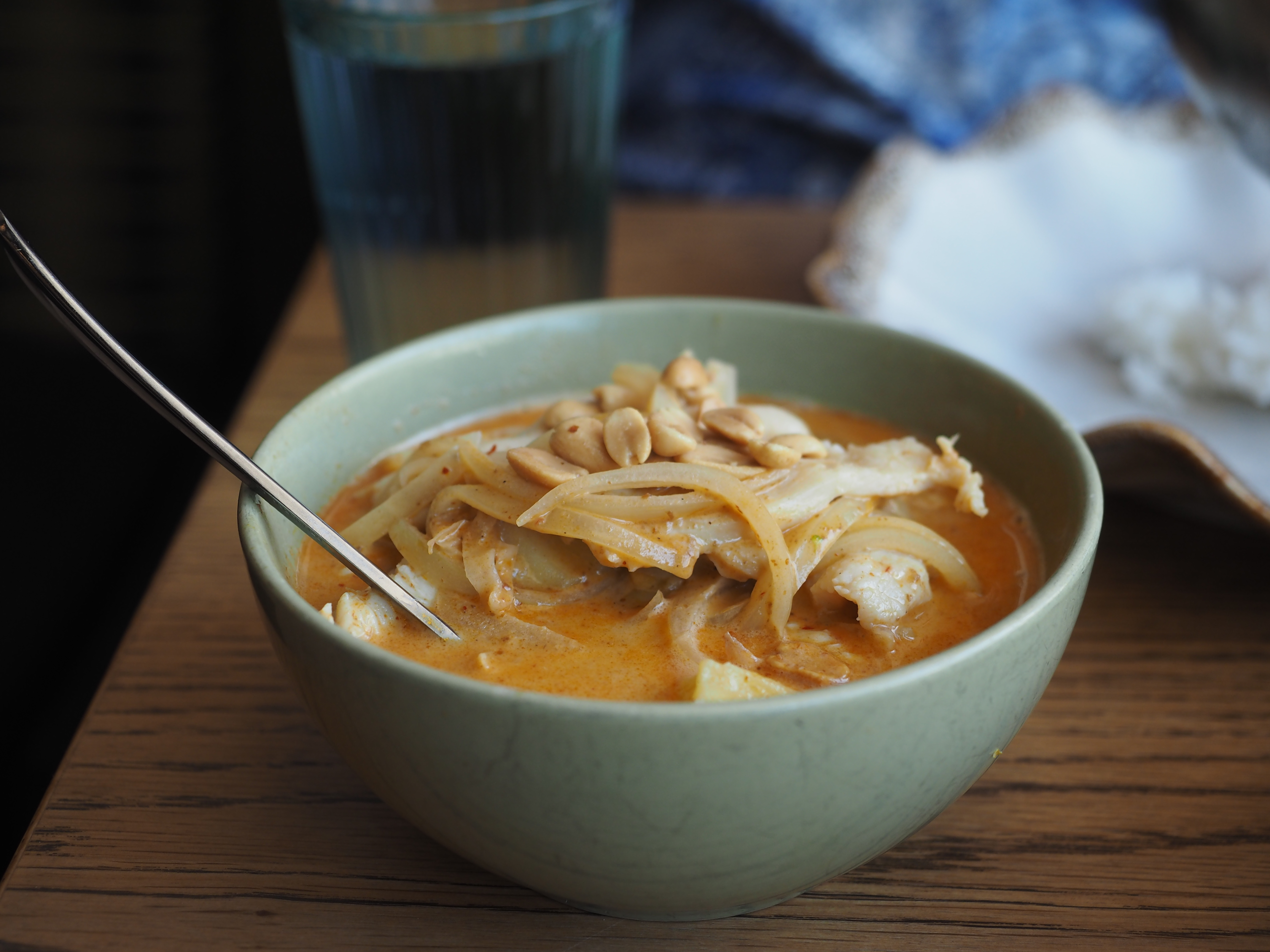
Beef massaman curry in Finland, served in a bowl

The name massaman is a corruption of the Persian term mosalmân (Persian: مسلمان), meaning "Muslim," and the name massaman did not exist in Persian or Indian languages. Hence, many earlier writers from the mid-19th century called the dish "Mussulman curry".

According to Thai journalist and scholar Santi Sawetwimon, as well as Thai food experts David Thompson and Hanuman Aspler the dish originated in 17th century central Thailand at the cosmopolitan court of Ayutthaya, through the Persian merchant Sheik Ahmad Qomi, from whom the noble Thai Bunnag family descends. Most theories contend that massaman is a southern Thai dish influenced by Malay and Indian cuisines.

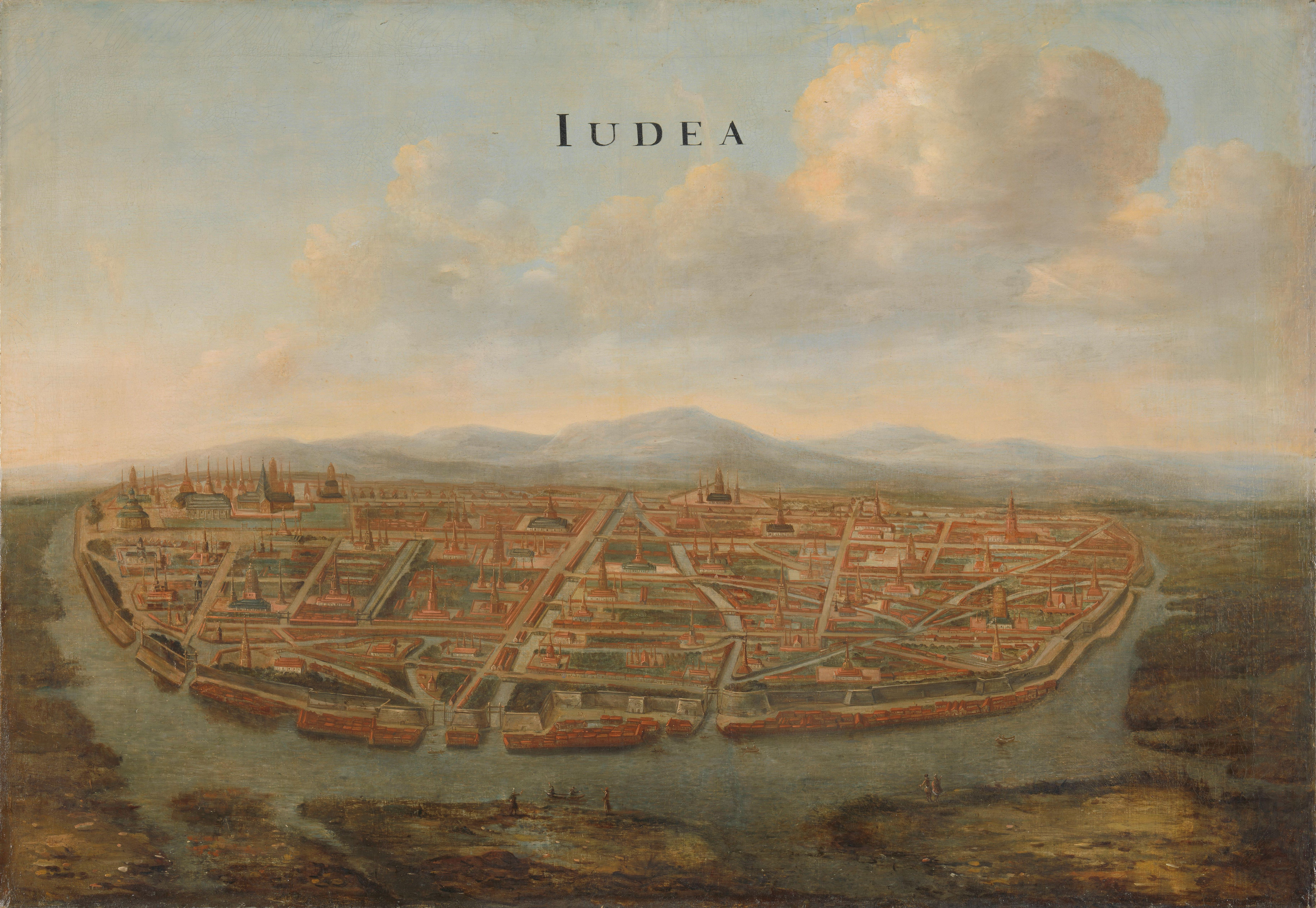
Ayutthaya, mid-17th century

The curry is extolled in the poem Kap He Chom Khrueang Khao Wan from the end of the 18th century, attributed to Prince Itsarasunthon of Siam (now Thailand), the later King Rama II (1767–1824). It is dedicated to a lady who is thought to be Princess Bunrot, the later Queen Sri Suriyendra, wife of King Rama II. The second stanza of the poem reads:

มัสมั่นแกงแก้วตา หอมยี่หร่ารสร้อนแรง
ชายใดได้กลืนแกง แรงอยากให้ใฝ่ฝันหา

Translation:

Massaman, a curry made by my beloved, is fragrant of cumin and strong spices.
Any man who has swallowed the curry is bound to long for her.

The first-ever recorded recipe for massaman curry by Lady Plean Phatsakorawong in 1889: "Chicken Massaman curry with bitter orange juice", with Massaman spelled Matsaman (หมัดสมั่น). By 2002, it was being included in Australian recipe books as "Musaman beef curry".

In 2011, CNNGo ranked massaman curry as the number one most delicious food in an article titled "World's 50 most delicious foods". However, in a readers' survey, it ranked at number ten. It remained at number one in the official, updated 2018 version.

== See also ==
- Kaeng hang le
- Thai curry
- Thai cuisine
- List of Thai dishes
- List of Thai ingredients
