= Khua kling =

Spicy, dry-fried curry from Thai cuisine

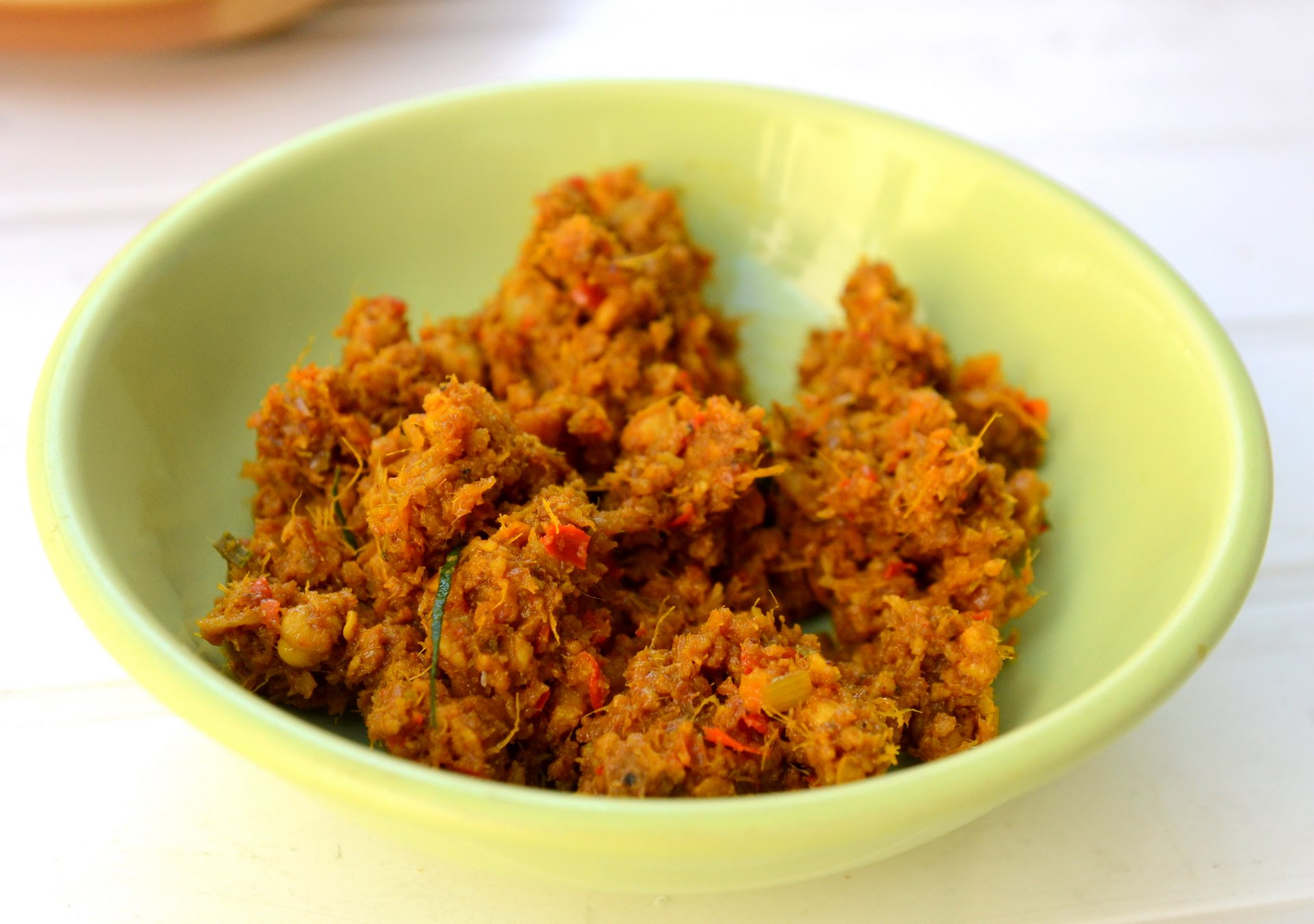
Khua kling in a bowl

Khua kling (Thai: คั่วกลิ้ง, pronounced [kʰûa̯ klîŋ]) is a spicy, dry-fried curry from Thai cuisine originating from the Southern Region. The primary components are meat and Southern Thai style red curry paste. Unlike most curries that are cooked in a spicy sauce, the dry meat style directly seasons the meat. When dry-frying the meat its fat renders allowing the curry paste to adhere.
