= Green curry =

Variety of curry

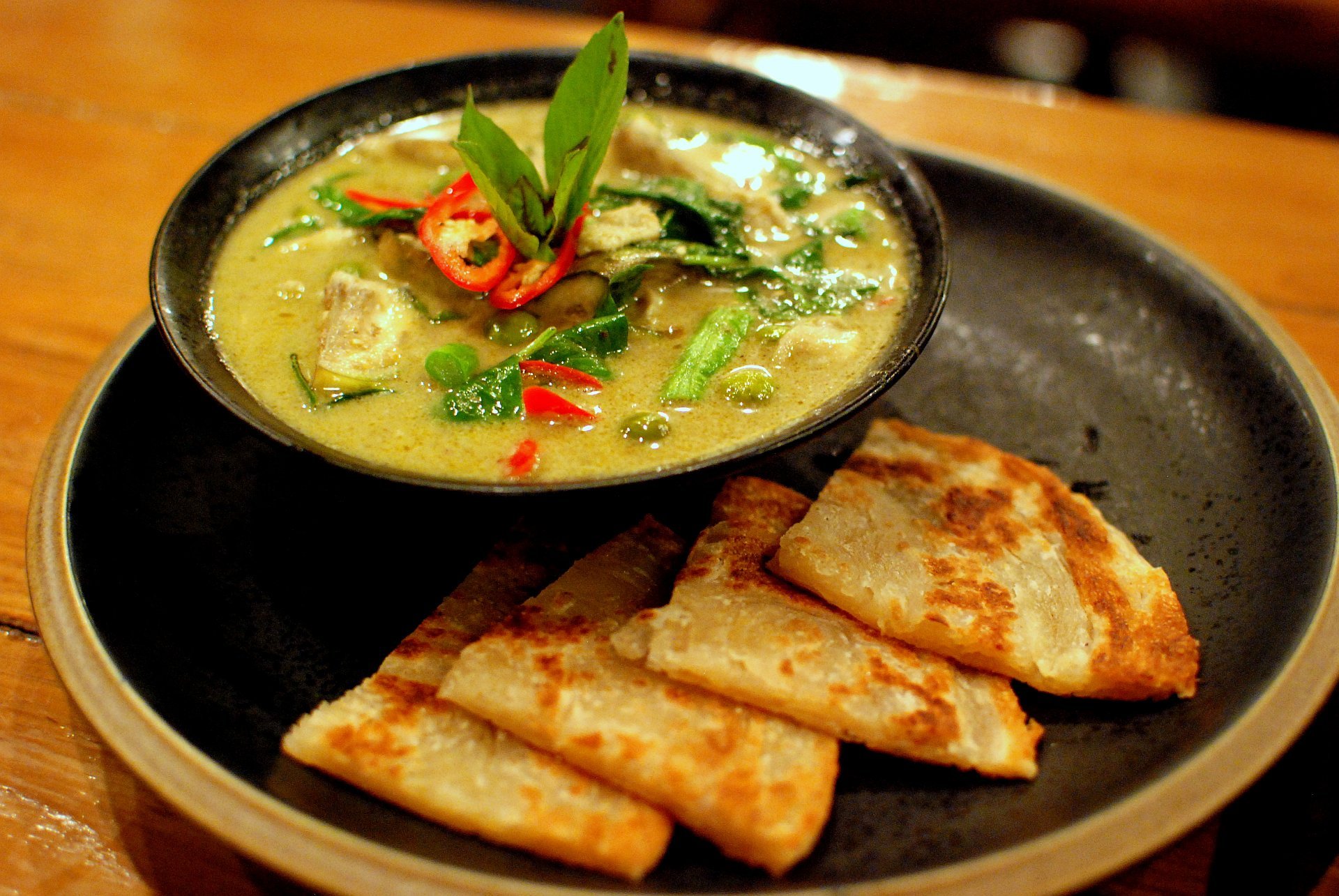
- Green curry with chicken, served with roti
- Alternative names: Kaeng khiao wan (native name); Thai cream curry
- Type: Thai curry
- Place of origin: Thailand
- Serving temperature: Hot
- Main ingredients: Coconut milk; green curry paste; palm sugar; fish sauce; kaffir lime leaves; Thai basil

Green curry (Thai: แกงเขียวหวาน, RTGS: kaeng khiao wan, pron. [kɛ̄ːŋ kʰǐaw wǎːn], lit. 'sweet-green curry') is a variety of curry originating from central Thailand.

== Etymology ==
The name green curry derives from the color of the dish, which comes from green chilies. The "sweet" in the Thai name (หวาน, wan means 'sweet') refers to the particular color green itself and not to the taste of the curry. As this is a Thai curry based on coconut milk and fresh green chilies, the color comes out creamy mild green or, as this color is called in Thai, 'sweet green' (เขียวหวาน, khiao-wan).

Its ingredients are not fixed. The curry is not necessarily sweeter than other Thai curries, but although the spiciness varies, it tends to be more pungent than the milder red curries. Green curry evolved during the reign of King Rama VI or Rama VII, between the years 1908–1926.

== Ingredients ==
Apart from the main protein (traditionally fish, fish balls, or meat), the other ingredients for the dish consist of coconut milk, green curry paste, palm sugar, and fish sauce. Thai eggplant (aubergine), pea aubergine, basil leaves (or other green or whitish vegetables), and even fruit are often included.

The consistency of its sauce varies with the amount of coconut milk used. Green curry paste is traditionally made by pounding in a mortar green bird's eye chillies, shallots, garlic, galangal, lemongrass, kaffir lime peel, cilantro roots (coriander), cumin seeds, white peppercorns, shrimp paste and salt.

== Cooking method ==
The paste is fried in split coconut milk until the oil is expressed to release the aromas in the paste. Once the curry paste is cooked, more coconut milk and the remaining ingredients are added, along with a pinch of palm sugar and fish sauce. Finally, as garnishes, Thai basil, fresh kaffir lime leaves, sliced phrik chi faa (the common name means 'sky-pointing chilies', which refers to large mild chilies such as Cayenne pepper) are often used. For a more robust green curry, such as with seafood, julienned krachai (fingerroot or Chinese keys), white turmeric, and holy basil can be used as garnishes.

== Serving ==
Green curry is typically eaten with rice as part of a wider range of dishes in a meal or with round rice noodles known as khanom jeen as a single dish.

== Gallery ==
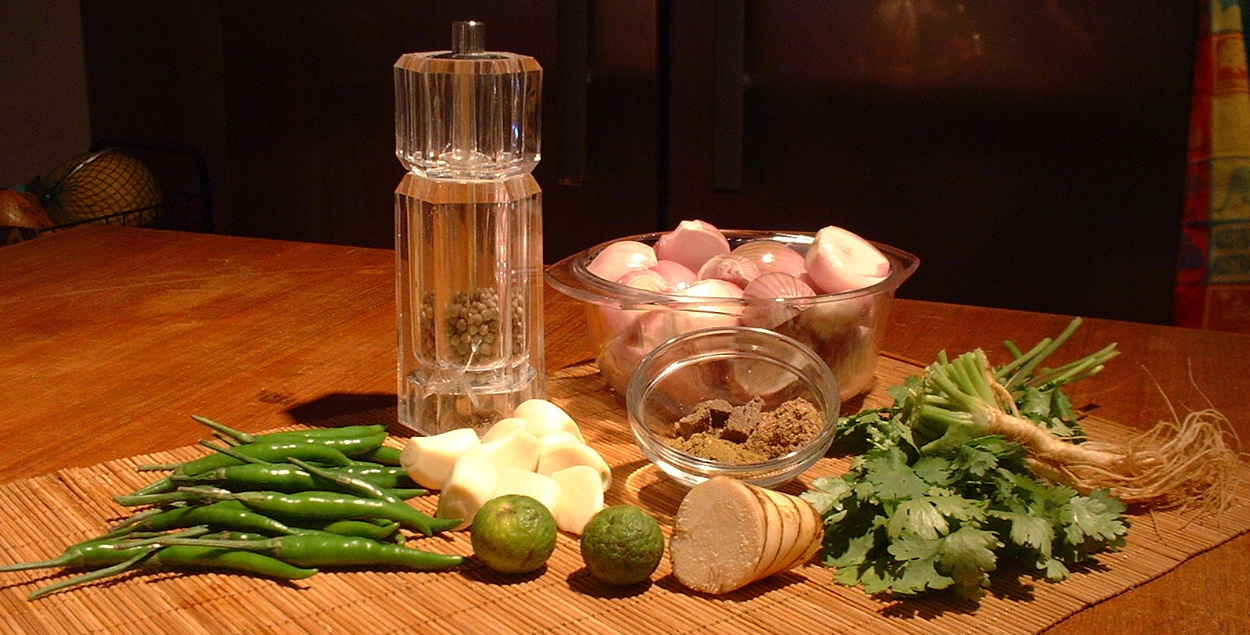
Ingredients for green curry paste

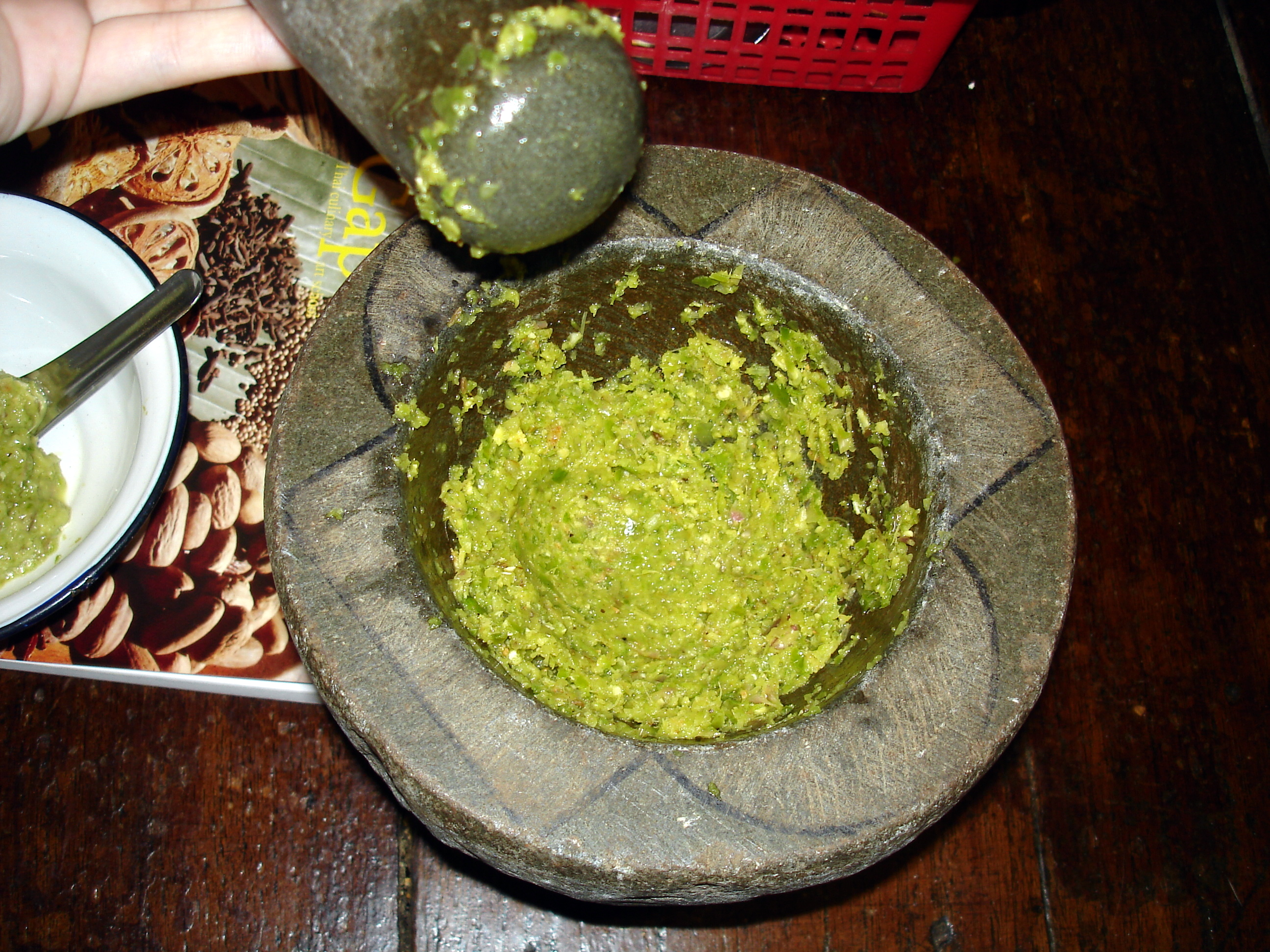
Freshly made green curry paste in a mortar

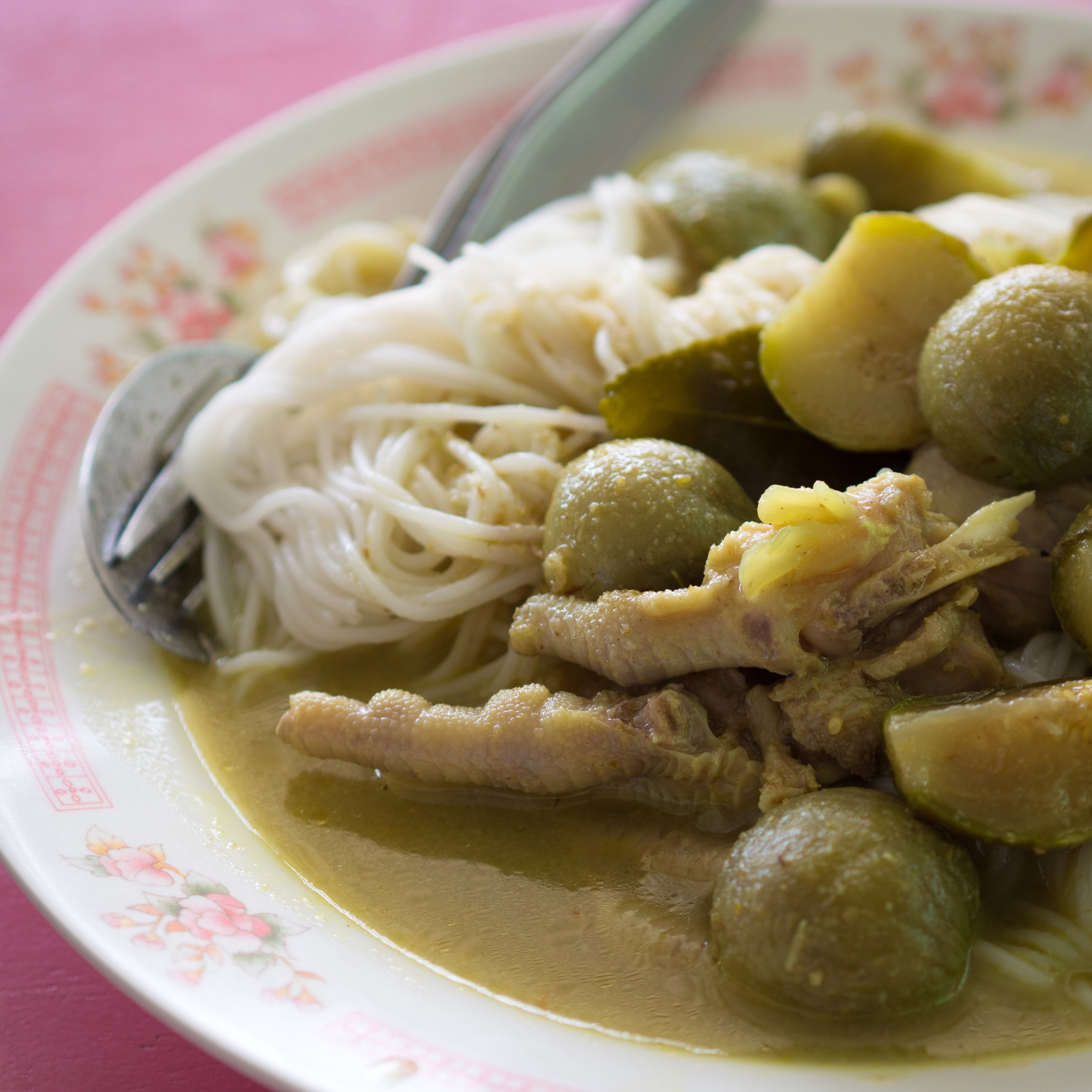
Green chicken feet curry served with khanom jeen

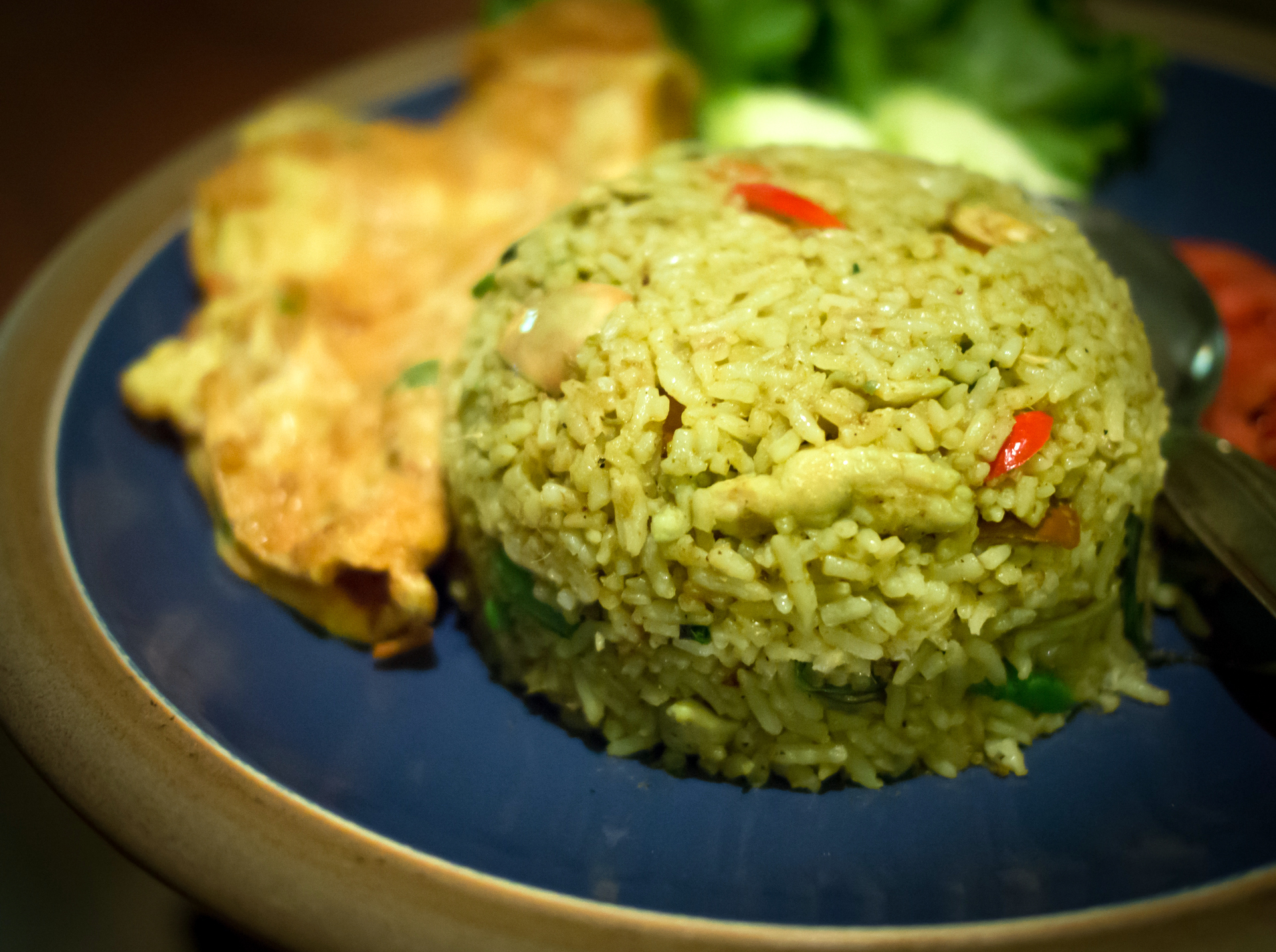
Rice fried with green curry

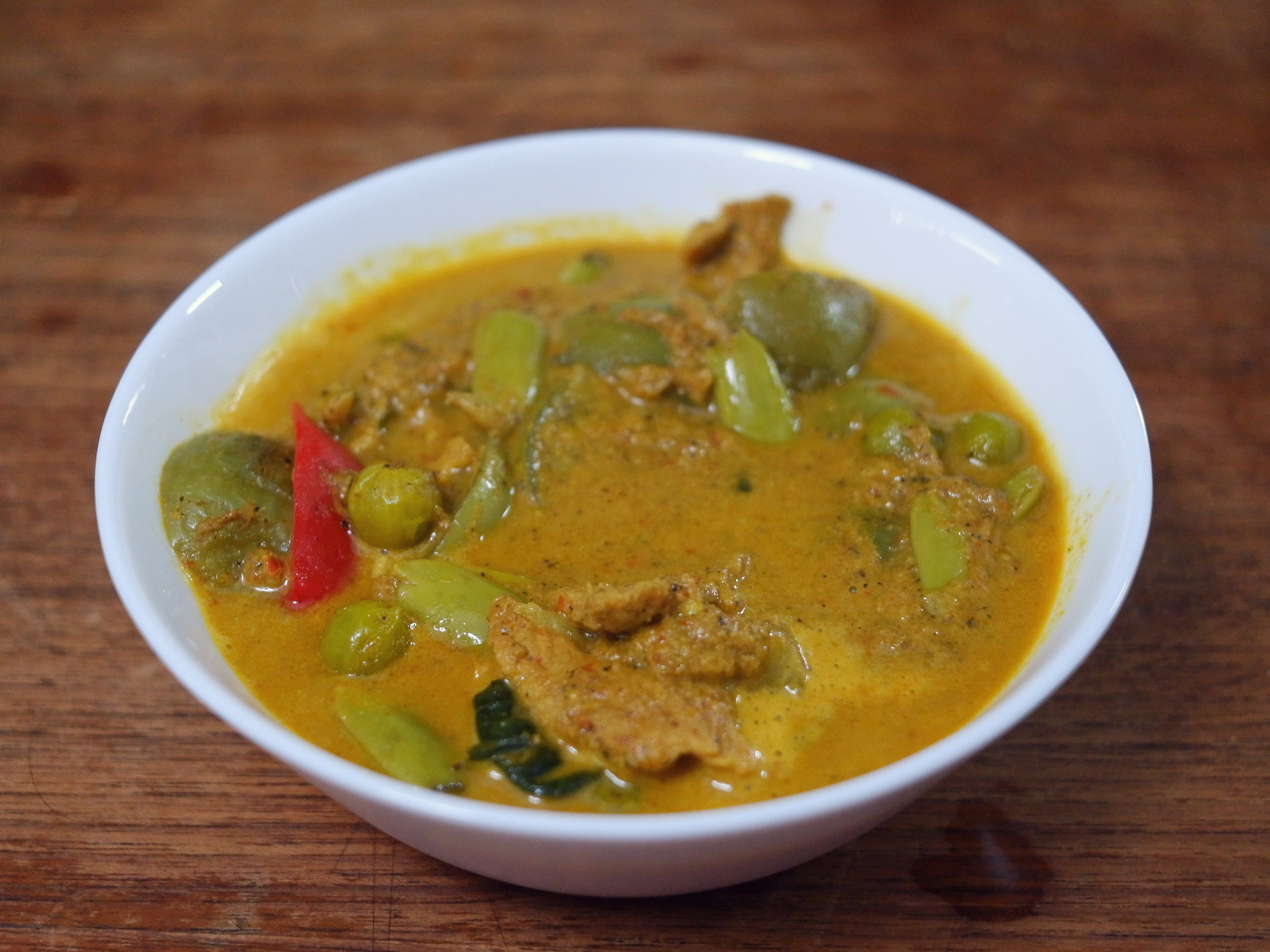
Green curry with meat

== See also ==
- Thai curry
- Red curry
- Masak lemak
