= Kaeng pa =

Spicy Thai curry dish

- Jungle curry at Jitlada
- Alternative names: Gaeng pa, jungle curry, forest curry
- Type: Curry
- Course: Main
- Place of origin: Central-/North Thailand
- Region or state: Southeast Asia
- Serving temperature: Hot
- Main ingredients: Pork, chicken

Kaeng pa (Thai: แกงป่า, pronounced [kɛ̄ːŋ pàː], lit. 'jungle curry' or 'forest curry') is a variety of Thai curry from the forested areas of Thailand. Unlike many other Thai curries, traditional kaeng pa usually contains no coconut milk, as coconuts are not naturally found in the rainforests in the northern part of the country. This quality makes it more suitable for people on low saturated fat diets. There are, however, variants that do include coconut.

Kaeng pa is a highly spicy and watery curry that has a distinctive full taste. Ingredients usually include kaffir lime peel and leaves, lemongrass, green pepper corns, galangal, garlic, pea eggplant and chilli. It was originally prepared with wild boar, but is now more commonly prepared with pork or chicken.

== See also ==
- Thai curry
