= Curry paste =

Food paste used in the preparation of a curry

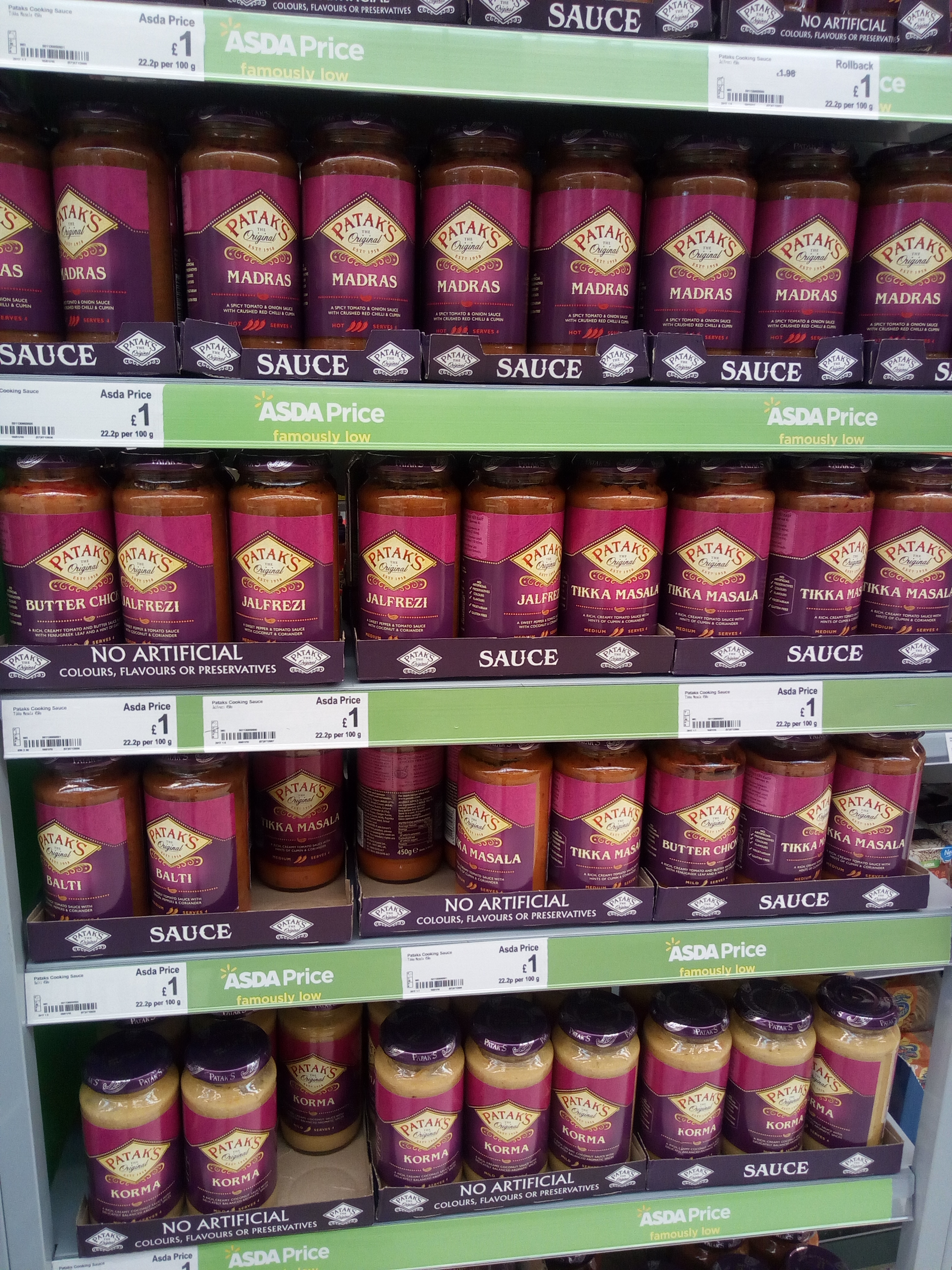
Indian curry pastes in a UK supermarket

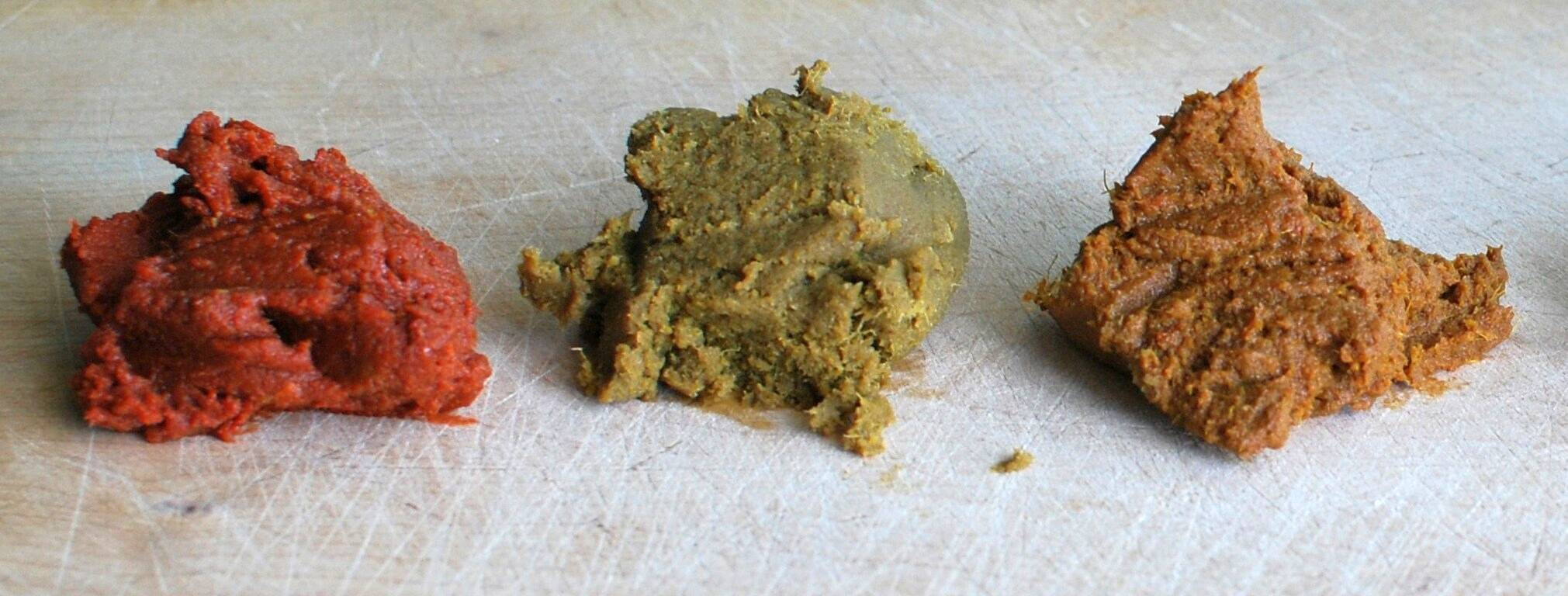
Thai red, green and yellow curry pastes

Curry paste is a mixture of ingredients in the consistency of a paste used in the preparation of a curry. There are different varieties of curry paste depending on the region and also within the same cuisine. It is generally a mixture of fine-powdered spices with either oil and water or coconut milk; the fat content helps extract the flavor. Some cuisines (e.g. Thai) favor the use of a curry paste over a curry powder.

== In Chinese cuisine ==
Lee Kum Kee makes a curry paste (Chinese: 咖喱酱; lit. 'curry paste') in Hong Kong which is standard for local curries. Another Hong Kong company calls the type of product "oil curry" (Chinese: 油咖喱), which is also the term used in Mainland China, especially Shanghai where it is a staple.

== In Southeast Asian cuisines ==
Curry pastes are believed to have entered Southeast Asian cuisines via trade routes with southern India through the kitchens of Indianized royal courts of Southeast Asia, where the curry pastes were adapted for local taste preferences, as well as available spices and herbs. In Burmese cuisine, turmeric was added to the mixture of chiles, garlic, ginger, and onions. Through Java, the preparation of curry pastes from India entered Khmer royal cuisine, which then made its way into the royal kitchens of Ayutthaya Kingdom, where turmeric was replaced with cardamom and tamarind. In Cambodian and Thai cuisine, lemongrass and galangal were added to the mixture. Malaysian cuisine uses more wild lime leaves, while Vietnamese cuisine adds more star anise. Malaysian and Indonesian cuisine make a greater use of cinnamon (or cassia), cloves, and nutmeg.

== See also ==
- Curry powder
- Kroeung
- Masala
- Thai curry paste
