= Walter Scheib =

American chef (1954-2015)

- Born: Walter Stanley Scheib III; May 3, 1954; Oakland, California, U.S.
- Died: c. June 13, 2015 (aged 61); Near the Yerba Canyon trailhead in the Sangre de Cristo Mountains near Taos, New Mexico, U.S.
- Education: The Culinary Institute of America
- Spouse(s): Jean Prince (divorced); Yvonne Swartz (divorced)
- Children: 2
- Culinary career
- Cooking style: American cuisine

Walter Stanley Scheib III (May 3, 1954 – c. June 13, 2015) was an American chef who was White House Executive Chef from 1994 until 2005.

== Early life and work ==
=== Early life ===
Scheib was born on May 3, 1954, in Oakland, California, to Walter S. Scheib Jr. and his wife, Jean Scheib. His father worked for the Atomic Energy Commission, and his mother was an accountant. The Scheibs moved to Bethesda, Maryland, when Walter was a young boy.

Scheib's mother was a devotee of French cooking long before it became popular in the United States, often making paella and bouillabaisse. She also cooked Spanish cuisine, and taught Walter to appreciate unusual flavor combinations. Scheib's favorite television programs were The Galloping Gourmet with Graham Kerr and The French Chef with Julia Child. He asked his mother to allow him to chop vegetables or prepare food so often, that in time he became extremely proficient at cooking and was allowed to prepare all the family's meals. In his teens, he worked in local restaurants as a pot washer, busboy, and prep cook.

Scheib graduated from Walter Johnson High School in Bethesda in 1972. He enrolled at the University of Maryland, College Park, but quit and enrolled at The Culinary Institute of America in Hyde Park, New York, where he graduated in 1979.

=== Early work ===
After a period where he worked in France, Scheib moved to Washington, D.C., where he found work as a line chef in the kitchen at the Capital Hilton. Within three years, he had risen to the position of chef de cuisine (executive chef).

He moved to the Boca Raton Resort and Club in Boca Raton, Florida, in 1986, where he served four years as the executive chef. Scheib then returned to D.C., where he served briefly as executive chef at the Mayflower Hotel.

In 1990, he took a position as the executive chef at The Greenbrier, a luxury resort near White Sulphur Springs, West Virginia. At The Greenbrier, Scheib directed a staff of 200, and often prepared as many as 1,000 meals a night.

== White House ==
=== Auditioning ===
The White House kitchen had been dominated from 1966 to 1987 by Henry Haller, a Swiss-trained chef who emphasized French cooking. His successor, Jon Hill, lasted just five months before being replaced by long-time sous-chef Hans Raffert, but Raffert retired in October 1992, and French-born and trained chef Pierre Chambrin, who succeeded Raffert, was asked to resign in March 1994 after refusing to cook the low-fat American cuisine favored by President Bill and First Lady Hillary Clinton. Most of Chambrin's staff were also asked to leave.

Scheib's mother had just died, and Scheib did not want to take on a new job. Scheib's wife submitted his résumé without his knowledge. He was among 4,000 applicants for the position, and one of just five asked to audition for the First Lady. Mrs. Clinton was impressed with Scheib's managerial skills and ability to prepare hundreds of first-class meals in a short period of time. She also wanted the White House to feature more distinctively American cooking techniques, dishes, and presentation, something she believed Scheib could bring to the White House. She also wanted to get away from the cream- and fat-heavy dishes of French cooking. Scheib was competing against some of the best chefs in the United States, including Nora Pouillon and Patrick Clark (then at the Hay–Adams Hotel). Scheib auditioned before the First Lady and several other women by presenting pecan-encrusted lamb, red-curried sweet potatoes, and morel sauce. While other chefs primarily brought in dishes they normally serve in their restaurants, Scheib's lunch featured a wide variety of American cuisines: Cal-Italian, Mid-Atlantic, Southwestern, Floridian, and even a vegetarian serving. Hillary Clinton hired Scheib after Clark, her first choice, turned her down.

=== Clinton years ===
Among Scheib's immediate innovations as White House Executive Chef was the establishment of a vegetable garden on the roof of the White House and the modernization of the kitchen in 1993. He also taught Chelsea Clinton how to cook. Meeting the dining needs of the Clintons was demanding. Hillary Clinton enjoyed hot sauces, and Bill Clinton loved to gorge on cheeseburgers and a 24-ounce porterhouse steak with béarnaise sauce and onion rings whenever the First Lady was absent. Chelsea Clinton's decision to become a vegetarian in 1999 created major problems for the kitchen staff, who could no longer use the same utensils and pans for cooking meat and vegetables.

=== Bush years and dismissal ===
White House Executive Chefs do not normally change when a new administration arrives, and, as usual, President George W. Bush and First Lady Laura Bush retained Scheib when they entered the White House in 2001. However, the Bushes had different tastes and styles than the Clintons. Laura Bush wanted a more formal presentation at meals, and President Bush disliked soup, salad, and poached fish—staples of Scheib's cuisine. Instead, the president favored peanut butter and honey sandwiches, BLTs, and cheeseburgers. The twin Bush girls both required that the calories in each meal be given to them. After the September 11 attacks in 2001, Scheib's cooking duties were largely restricted to the First Family, as all social engagements at the White House were curtailed for nearly a year. President Bush affectionately called Scheib "Cookie".

Tension between the Bushes and Scheib was soon apparent. An anonymous White House staffer later claimed that Scheib kept serving the Bushes scallops, even though they disliked them. Scheib angrily denied the assertion. The differences became too great, and Scheib was fired by the Bushes in February 2005. He was succeeded in August 2005 by Cristeta Comerford, a White House sous-chef whom Scheib had hired in 1995.

During both the Clinton and Bush administrations, Scheib usually served three meals a day to the First Family. He often worked long hours each day, and as many as six days a week. The number of expected guests at both informal and formal dining occasions fluctuated greatly, and pleasing both First Families took a great deal of attention and care. Both the Bushes and Clintons loved enchiladas, fresh fruit, salads, and sorbets, and both presidents asked for junk food when their wives were not present. During his tenure at the White House, Scheib cooked for a large number of heads of state and VIPs, including Akihito, Emperor of Japan; Tony Blair, Prime Minister of the United Kingdom; Diana, Princess of Wales; Jacques Chirac, President of France; Nelson Mandela, the President of South Africa; and Boris Yeltsin, the first President of Russia.

== Post-White House ==
In 2007, Scheib authored (with Andrew Friedman) a memoir, The White House Chef: Eleven Years, Two Presidents, One Kitchen. He subsequently formed a corporation, The American Chef, which provided his services as a consultant and lecturer, and assisted in planning, preparing, and presenting Scheib-cooked meals for large groups. Between 2007 and 2015, he traveled to nearly every U.S. state and to 154 countries.

Scheib appeared on the television series Iron Chef America, which aired on the Food Network, in 2006.

=== Death ===
Scheib went hiking in Taos, New Mexico, and went missing on June 13, 2015. He was found dead on June 21, 2015.

An autopsy revealed that Scheib died from drowning on or about June 13. A precise date of death was not determined, as the cold water temperature of the ravine preserved his body in a manner that made it impossible to determine when exactly he had died. The area where he was hiking is prone to flash floods, and thunderstorms had struck the area the day he went missing. (Note: Scheib's body was found partially submerged in water in an inescapable ravine through which thunderstorm run-off was draining. The site was 25 yards (23 m) off the trail, and about 1.7 miles (2.7 km) from the head of the Yerba Canyon trail.)

== Personal life ==
Scheib met his first wife, Jean Prince, at the Capital Hilton, where she was working as a chef. The couple had two sons, Walter S. Scheib IV (born in 1988) and James Prince (born in 1991). Their marriage ended in divorce.

Scheib then married Yvonne Swartz; their marriage also ended in divorce.

== Bibliography ==
- Scheib, Walter; Friedman, Andrew (2007). White House Chef: Eleven Years, Two Presidents, One Kitchen. New York: John Wiley & Sons. ISBN 9780471798422.
- Tederick, Lydia Barker (Spring 2007). "A Look at the White House Kitchens" (PDF). White House History Journal: 10–29. Archived from the original (PDF) on June 23, 2015.

Preceded by Pierre Chambrin	White House Executive Chef; 1994–2005	Succeeded by Cristeta Comerford
