= Collinet =

Collinet is a surname. Notable people with the surname include:

- Dominique Collinet (born 1938), Belgian businessman
- Georges Collinet (born 1940?), American broadcaster
- Jean-Louis-François Collinet, French chef
- Rodolphe Collinet, Belgian businessman
