= Zephyr Wright =

Chef to U.S. President Lyndon Johnson

- Photograph of the signing of the Voting Rights Act in 1965. Wright is second from the right.
- Born: Zephyr Black; 1915; Marshall, Texas, U.S.
- Died: April 25, 1988 (aged 72–73); Washington D.C., U.S.
- Education: Wiley College
- Occupations: Presidential personal chef, maid
- Known for: Civil rights activism
- Spouse: Sammy Wright

Zephyr Wright (née Zephyr Black; 1915 – April 25, 1988) was an African-American civil rights activist and personal chef for President Lyndon B. Johnson and First Lady Lady Bird Johnson from 1942 until 1969. Wright influenced the passage of the Civil Rights Act of 1964; she had communicated her experiences living under Jim Crow laws to Johnson, which were later shared by Johnson with other influential lawmakers.

== Early life and education ==
Wright grew up in Marshall, Texas. She attended Wiley College, where she studied Home Economics. At Wiley, Wright took classes from professor and activist Melvin B. Tolson, who inspired her to become engaged with the civil rights movement.

In September 1942 with a recommendation from Wiley College president Dr. Matthew W. Dogan, Wright was hired by Lady Bird Johnson as a cook for herself and then-representative Lyndon Johnson.

== Racial discrimination ==
Wright accompanied Mrs. Johnson and another newly hired staff member, John Hickey, on their drive to Washington, D.C. The three had difficulty finding restaurants and hotels throughout the trip since segregated establishments often refused to serve Wright and Hickey. Wright said about the journey in a 1974 interview that she was often asked to enter restaurants through the kitchen or eat outside, but always refused, stating: "I felt that if I wasn't wanted, I wouldn't go. I felt happier not going."

When Wright moved with the president's family to Washington, D.C., several hotels in the Southern United States refused to let her stay because she was black. When Lyndon Johnson was senator, Wright refused to drive to Austin, Texas, with him, telling him: "When Sammy and I drive to Texas and I have to go to the bathroom, like Lady Bird or the girls, I am not allowed to go to the bathroom. I have to find a bush and squat. When it comes time to eat, we can't go into restaurants. We have to eat out of a brown bag. And at night, Sammy sleeps in the front of the car with the steering wheel around his neck, while I sleep in the back. We are not going to do it again."

During Johnson's presidency, Wright credits many of the racially charged experiences she and her husband experienced to describe the Johnson families' energy towards improving the rights and experiences of Black Americans.

== Friendship with Johnson ==
President Johnson often asked Wright's opinion of his legislative actions and appointments. Wright recalled one instance in 1967:

One day he came home, and he said, "Oh, do you see that I have appointed the first Negro to the Supreme Court?" I said, "Oh! Has it gone through?" And he said, "Well, no, but I'm sure it will. I've appointed him." That was referring to his appointment [Thurgood] Marshall to the Supreme Court.

Wright often relayed messages to President Johnson that she heard from people she encountered in her daily life, both of approval and disapproval of the Johnson administration. In one instance, Wright recalls approaching Johnson about the difference in salary between herself and another White House chef, to which Johnson responded by increasing the salaries of both Zephyr and her husband. Wright frequently cooked for guests of Johnson, including Speaker of the House Sam Rayburn. She spoke of serving food to longtime anti-civil rights senator Richard Russell Jr. and noted that she did not view his company as at all unpleasant.

Wright and Johnson maintained a friendly relationship and often conversed in a casual manner. Wright named several instances in which she and Johnson traded lighthearted words and poked fun at each other's sleep schedules. Wright was outspokenly supportive of Johnson's work on civil rights, stating that: "In talking with him I know he is for all of the Negro people, and he has done more for them than anyone else." Her time with the Johnsons concluded in 1969, at the end of Lyndon's presidential term.

When Johnson became Vice President of the United States, he sought Wright's opinion on matters such as the March on Washington for Jobs and Freedom. Wright's experiences with Jim Crow laws were used in conversations to build Congressional support of the Civil Rights Act of 1964. She was later a witness to his signing of the Civil Rights Act of 1964, and at the signing ceremony, he gave her the pen he had used to sign the act, saying: "You deserve this more than anyone else."

== End of life, death and legacy ==
She had been briefly replaced in her role cooking for the Johnson family by French-born White House Executive Chef René Verdon, who had also served the Kennedy family; however, by 1965 Johnson had disagreements with chef Verdon on creative differences and cost. Wright returned to cooking specifically for the Johnson family, and the role of White House Executive Chef was given to Henry Haller. Around 1966, Wright taught Luci Baines Johnson how to cook.

After retiring from service in 1969, Wright continued to live in Washington, D.C. She would receive fan mail for her work in the White House. In December 1963, Lady Bird Johnson said in an interview with Time magazine: "Zephyr is an expert at spoon bread, homemade ice cream and monumental Sunday breakfasts of deer sausage, home-cured bacon, popovers, grits, scrambled eggs, homemade peach preserves and coffee." Unfortunately, during her lifetime, Zephyr was not as well credited for her impactful civil rights work and her contributions to the Civil Rights Act of 1964 as she was for her cooking.

She was married to Sammy Wright, a chauffeur for President Johnson and his family, who preceded her in death in 1969. Wright died of a heart condition on April 25, 1988, in Washington, D.C.

Many of her recipes live on, including her "Pedernales River chili", published in the book Eating With Uncle Sam (2011; National Archives Foundation); and "Shrimp Curry A La Zephyr Wright", published by NPR (2008). In 2016, the Kitchen Sisters podcast on National Public Radio featured Wright in episode 44. Wright was named by The New York Times in 2019 as one of the "6 Black Chefs Who Changed the History of Food".

Wright was portrayed in a 2023 episode of the Max series Julia by actress Deidrie Henry. The episode depicted Wright's service to, and relationship with, the Johnson family.
