= Alexandre Choron =

Alexandre Choron may refer to:

- Alexandre Étienne Choron, French chef
- Alexandre-Étienne Choron, French musician
