= Intramotev =

American train refitting company

Intramotev is an American technology company headquartered in St. Louis, Missouri that develops battery-electric, self-propelled freight railcar retrofit systems. The company was founded in 2020 by Tim Luchini, Alex Peiffer, and Corey Vasel.

== Products ==
Intramotev produces two retrofit systems. The TugVolt converts a conventional freight car into a self-propelled battery-electric vehicle capable of autonomous or remote-controlled operation. It can decouple from a train consist and operate independently for short-haul movements. The ReVolt is designed to remain within a conventional train consist, capturing energy through regenerative braking and using it to power traction motors, reducing diesel consumption by the locomotive. Both systems are designed to be compatible with existing freight cars of various types, including hopper cars, well cars, and box cars.

== History ==
=== Founding and early development (2020–2023) ===
Intramotev was founded in St. Louis in 2020. The company received a $200,000 grant from Michigan's Office of Future Mobility and Electrification (OFME) to support development and testing of TugVolt railcars in Michigan's Upper Peninsula.

=== 2024 ===
In August 2024, Intramotev closed a $14.4 million Series A funding round led by Flybridge Capital Partners and Alpaca VC, with additional investors including Advantage Capital, Aera VC, Band VC, Cantos, Cathcart Rail, Collide Capital, Decisive Point, and Idealab Arizona.

Also in August 2024, the company demonstrated an autonomous double-stack well car carrying two 40-foot intermodal containers at its St. Louis facility.

In December 2024, Intramotev deployed its TugVolt system at a calcium mine operated by Carmeuse Americas in Cedarville, Michigan. The deployment was the first of three planned TugVolt units at the site.

=== 2025–present ===
In March 2025, the company named Harry Zander, formerly Chief Revenue Officer of Patriot Rail, as its Chief Commercial Officer.

In June 2025, a retired two-star U.S. Army general with experience at the Army's Transportation School joined the company as an adviser as Intramotev began pursuing government and defense applications.

In September 2025, Intramotev announced a commercial agreement with Watco, a shortline railroad holding company, with initial deployment planned at Watco's transload terminal in Wood River, Illinois.

In January 2026, Rail Cargo Austria, the freight subsidiary of ÖBB (Austrian Federal Railways), awarded Intramotev a contract for the design, manufacture, commissioning, testing, and support of self-propelled freight wagons, with a contract value of approximately €3.3 million.

== Regulatory environment ==
Because early deployment sites have been private lines isolated from the national rail network, Intramotev's technology has operated outside the jurisdiction of the Federal Railroad Administration (FRA). Operation on the common-carrier rail network would require a regulatory waiver from the FRA.
