= Pommes soufflées =

Fried potato dish

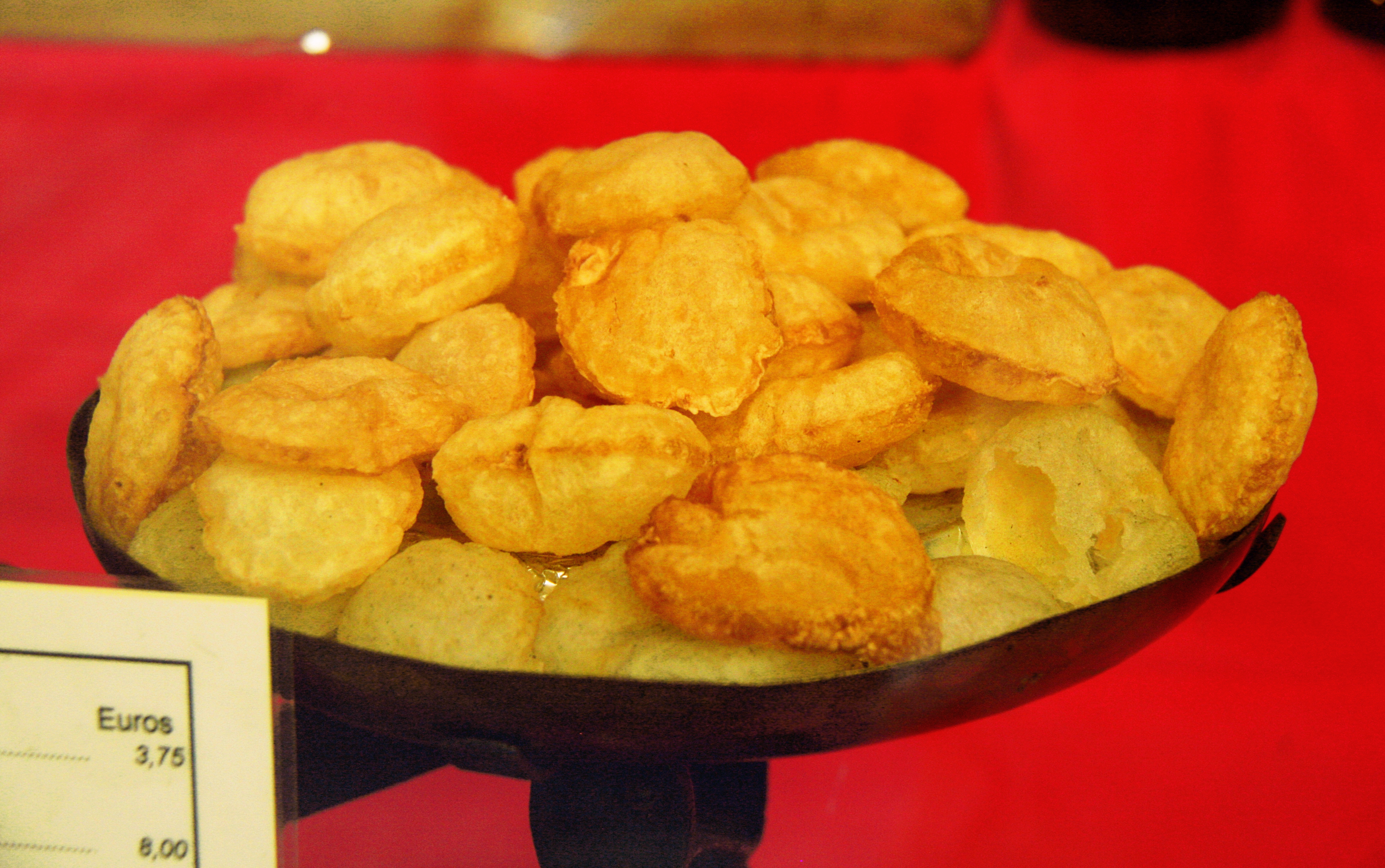
- Main ingredients: Potatoes

Pommes soufflées are a variety of French fried potato. Slices of potato are fried twice, once at 150 °C (302 °F) and a second time after being cooled, at 190 °C (374 °F). The potato slices puff up into little pillows during the second frying and turn golden brown.

Pommes soufflées were, according to a famous legend, discovered by chance on 24 August 1837, when Queen Marie-Amélie and other notables were delayed in their arrival for a meal at the Pavillon Henri IV in Yvelines after inaugurating the first passenger steam-powered railway in Paris, France. Chef Jean-Louis-François Collinet, reputedly also the inventor of sauce béarnaise, removed the potatoes from the fryer half cooked. After the royal party had arrived, during serving time, he observed the potatoes expand when they were returned to the oil. This story has been disputed on a number of grounds.

== See also ==
- List of deep fried foods
- Triple-cooked chips
