= Musée en Herbe =

Children's art museum in Paris, France

Museum in the Making 'Budding Museum'
- Le Musée en Herbe

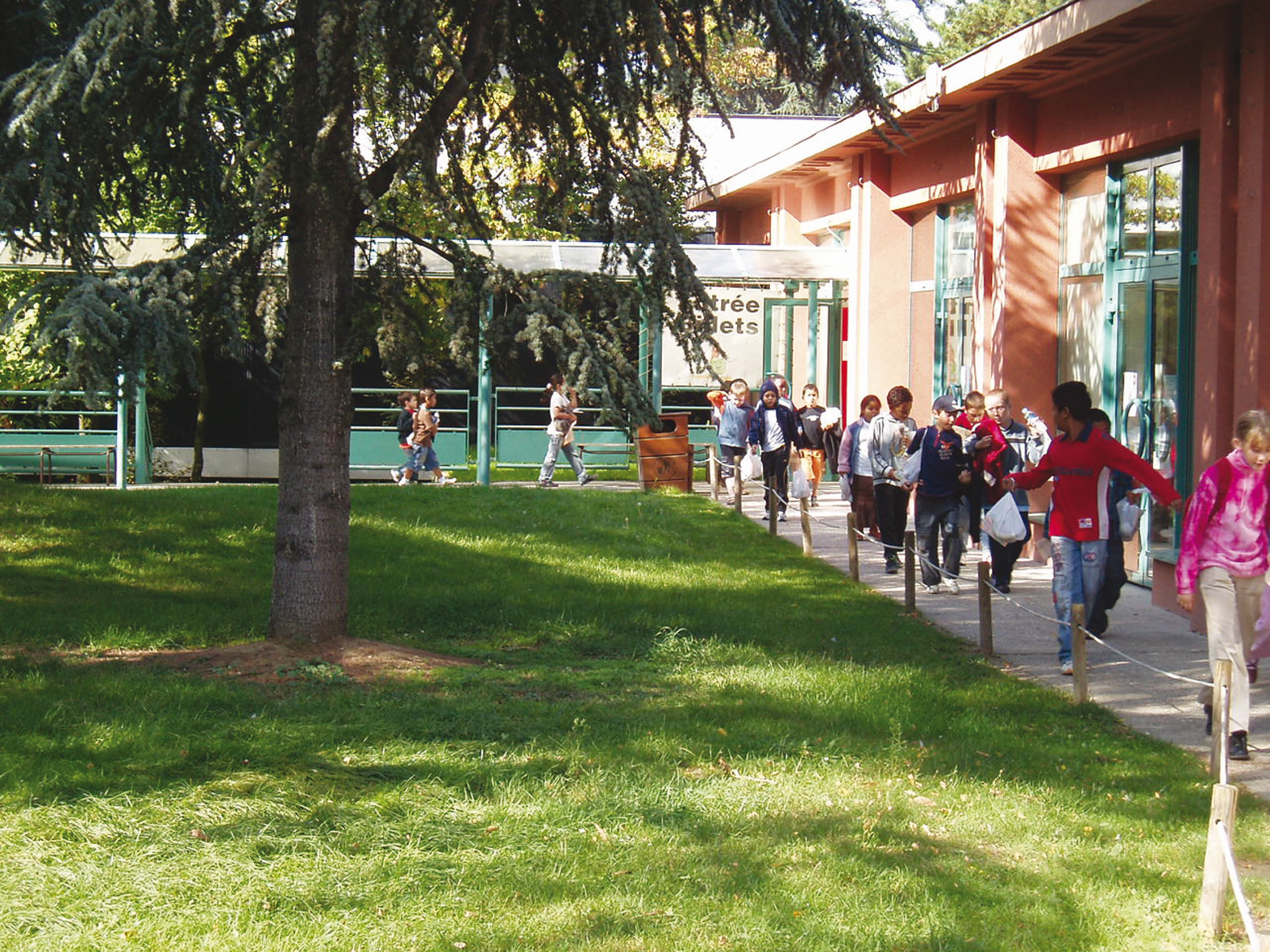
- Building exterior
- Established: 1 April 1975
- Location: 23 rue de l'Arbre-Sec; 75001 Paris, France
- Coordinates: 48.8601518°N 2.3419528°E
- Type: Children's museum, art museum
- Visitors: 130,000
- Founders: Sylvie Girardet, Claire Merleau-Ponty, & Anne Tardy
- Website: musee-en-herbe.com

The Musée en Herbe (English: Museum in the Making, lit. 'Budding Museum') is children's museum in Paris, France. It provides art education based out of the 1st arrondissement near the Louvre.

The museum was established by Sylvie Girardet, Claire Merleau-Ponty, & Anne Tardy in 1975. Originally located in the Jardin d'Acclimatation amusement park, the organization strives to bring art a children who would not otherwise go to a museum. During the COVID-19 pandemic, the museum relied on public appeals to offset lost ticket sales in order to continue operations.

Children can either participate in hands-on workshops or view traveling exhibits. These exhibits have included Tintin comics by Hergé, street art by Invader, book illustrations by Roger Hargreaves, spider art in conjunction with the Museum of Natural History, Chinese mythological paintings by Wenna, and luminescent sculptures by Miguel Chevalier. The museum displays the art at children's height.

== Gallery ==
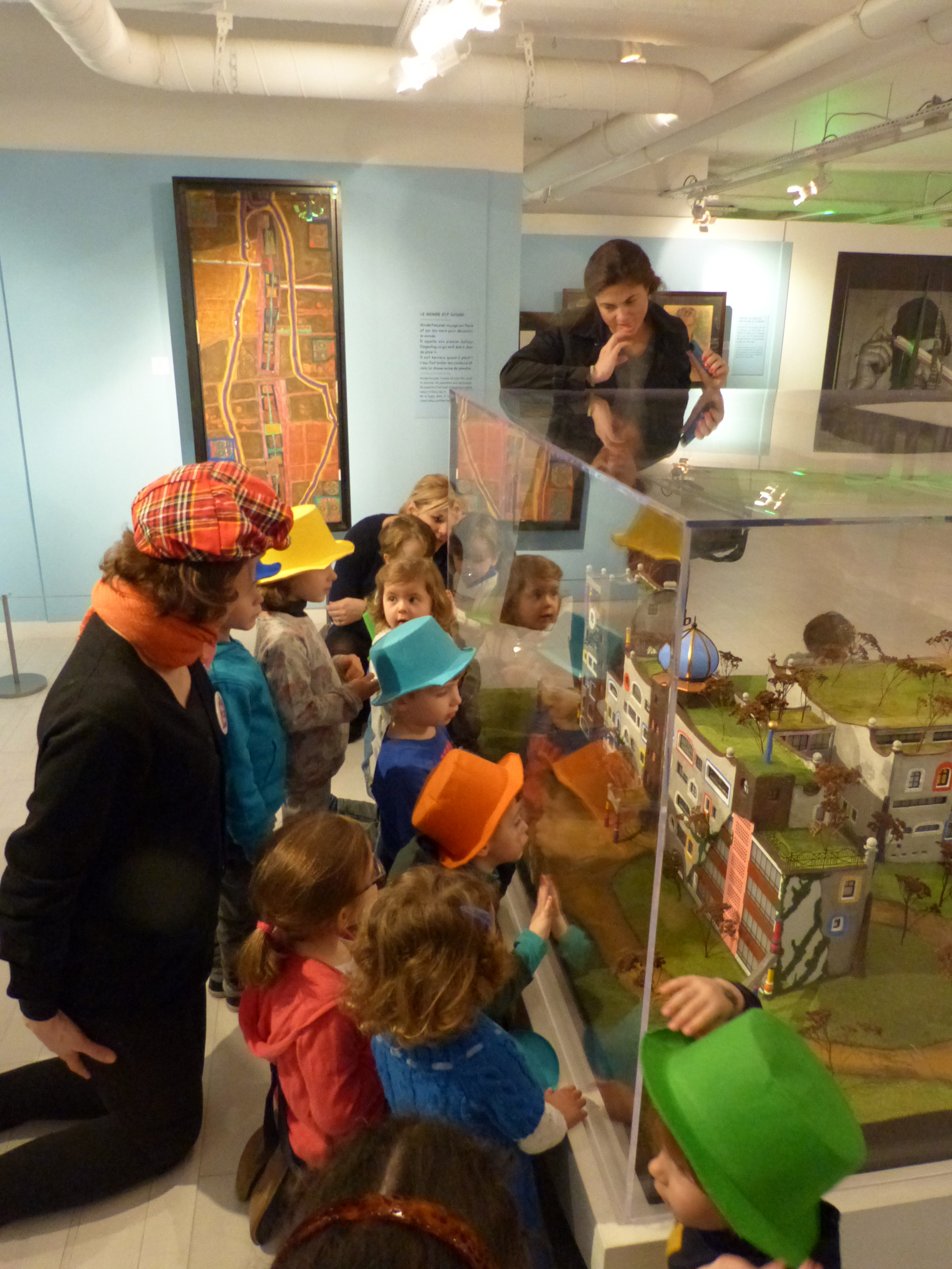
Diorama in glass showcase

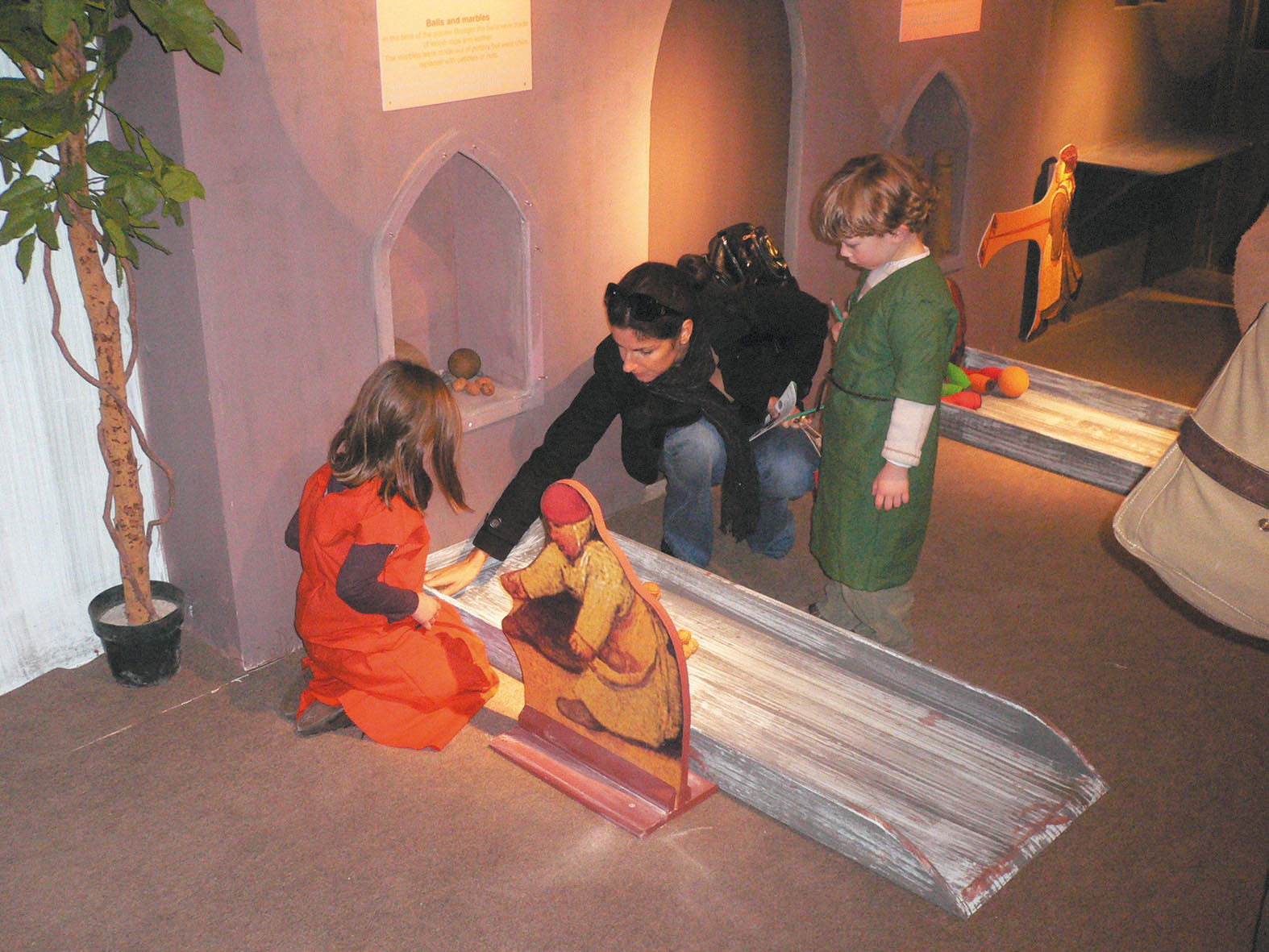
Pieter Bruegel exhibit

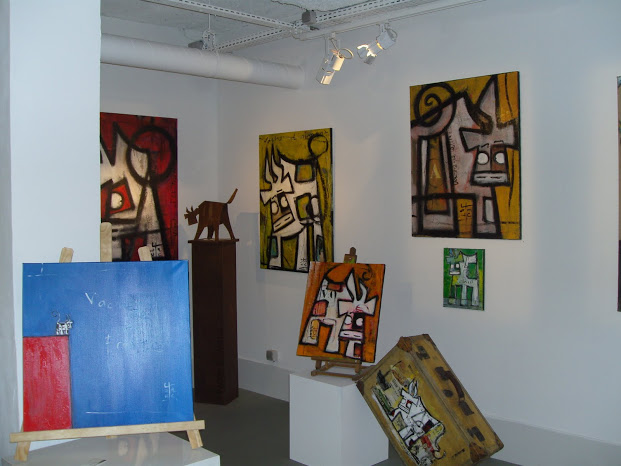
Cow exhibition by VanLuc

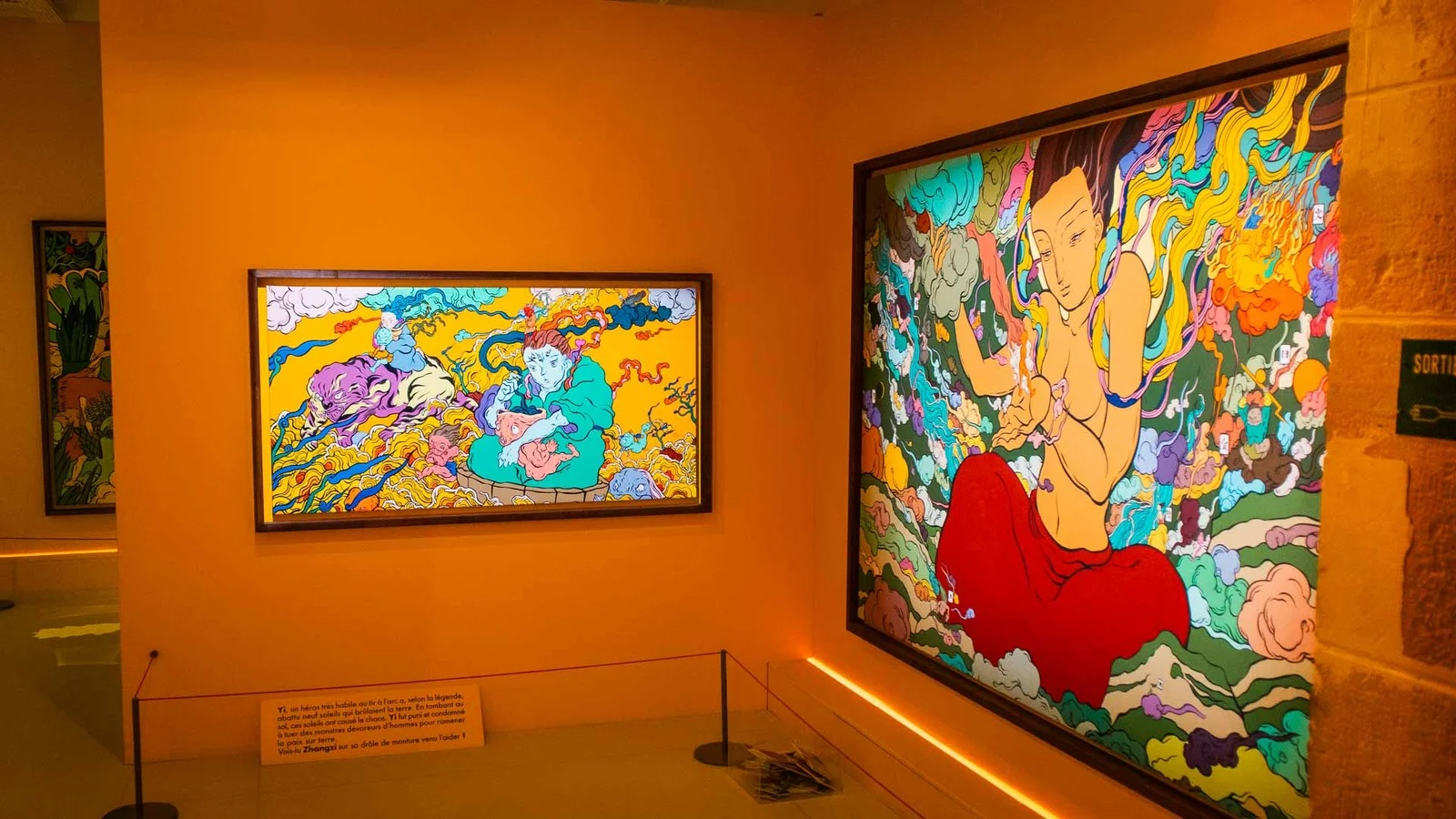
Mythology exhibition by Wenna

== See also ==
- List of museums in Paris
