= Dominique Collinet =

Belgian businessman

- Occupation: Businessman
- Children: Rodolphe Collinet

Dominique Collinet is a Belgian businessman. He was the chief executive officer of Carmeuse, a leading global producer of lime. He is also vice-president of the European Landowners Organisation, and a member of the business club Cercle de Lorraine. He retired in 2003, and his son, Rodolphe Collinet, is the present CEO of Carmeuse.

== Sources ==
- Carmeuse Group
- Cercle de Lorraine (member)
- history of Union Wallonne des Entreprises (President 1993–1996)
