= Pierre Chambrin =

American chef (born 1947)

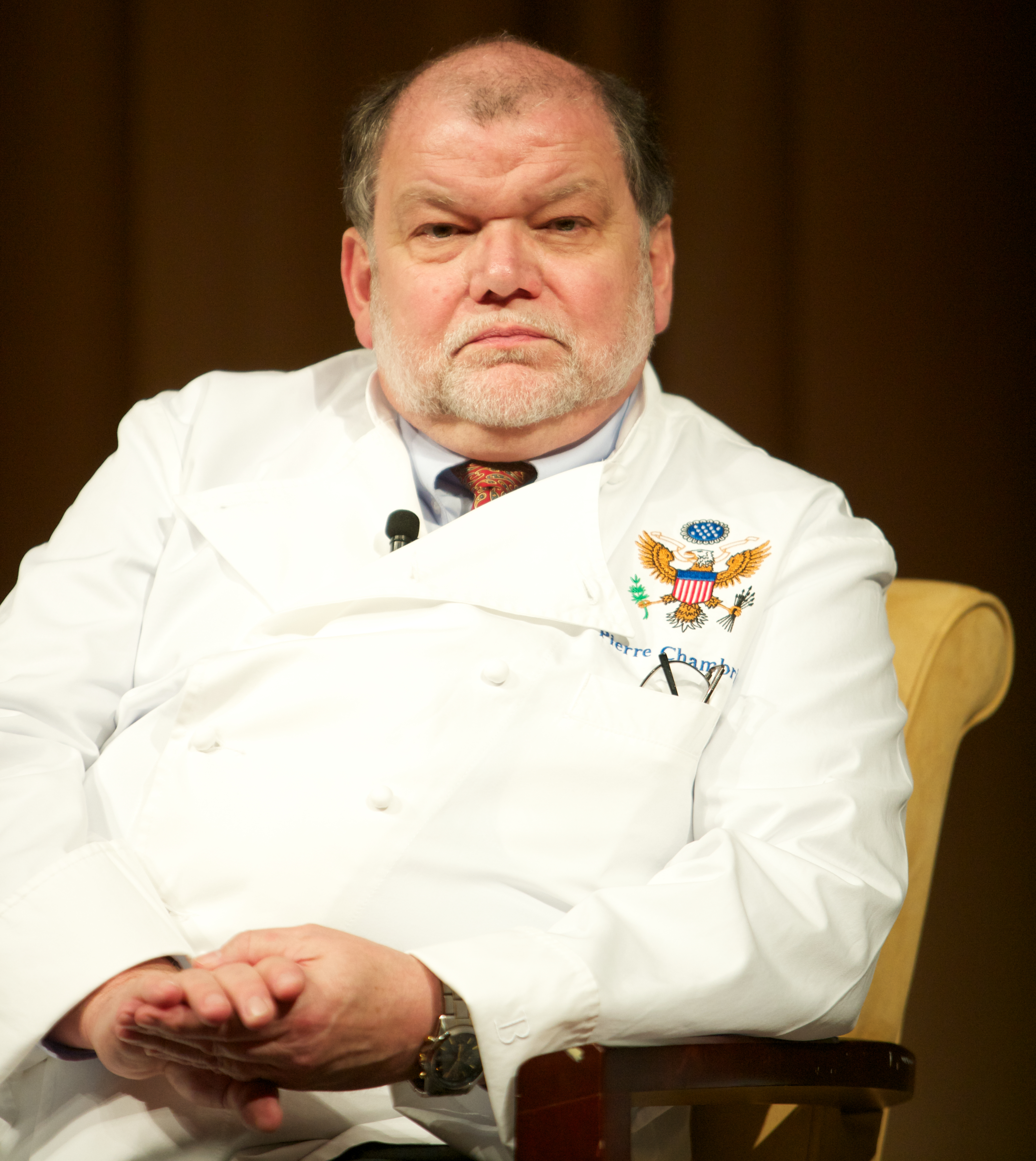
- Chambrin in 2011
- Born: September 13, 1947 (age 79); Paris, France
- Education: Ecole des Metiers de l'alimentation
- Culinary career
- Cooking style: French

Pierre Chambrin (born September 13, 1947) is a French-born American chef who served as the White House Executive Chef from 1989 to 1994.

== Early life and career ==
Chambrin was born in Paris on September 13, 1947. He received his culinary education at the Ecole des Metiers de l'alimentation, which he attended from 1961 to 1963. He moved to the United States in 1969 and opened a restaurant called Picot's Place in Massachusetts. In 1979 Chambrin took over the Washington, D.C. restaurant Maison Blanche, located near the White House.

== White House ==
Chambrin was appointed under the presidency of George H. W. Bush to succeed Hans Raffert. Under the Clinton administration, a group of prominent American chefs, led by Alice Waters, sent a letter to the White House urging an appointment of a chef who would "promote American cooking," although Chambrin stated that he was already using American ingredients and that his first concern was food quality. Ruth Reichl defended the chef in an article in the Los Angeles Times, calling him "enthusiastic about just about everything organic, and so excited by the idea of seasonality," and pointing out that it was not the norm for new administrations to appoint a new chef. In March 1994, however, Chambrin resigned after a push from the administration to impose newer health standards, specifically using food with less fat, a standard that Chambrin was unwilling to conform to. It was widely reported that he was asked to resign, although he says that this is not the case and it was his own decision. Chambrin's staff of three chefs left the White House with him. He was succeeded by Walter Scheib.

== Later career ==
After leaving the White House, Chambrin became the executive chef at the Saint Louis Club in St. Louis, Missouri. The Maitres Cuisiniers de France named him "Chef of the Year" in 2008, and the Academie Culinaire de France bestowed its Lifetime Achievement Award on him in 2013.

== Personal life ==
Chambrin has been married to his wife Linda since 1977 and has two children Sabrina (John) Jureidini and Pierre (Giselle) Chambrin and three grandchildren. He became a United States citizen in 1977.

Preceded by Hans Raffert	White House Executive Chef; 1992—1994	Succeeded by Walter Scheib
