= Hans Raffert =

German American chef

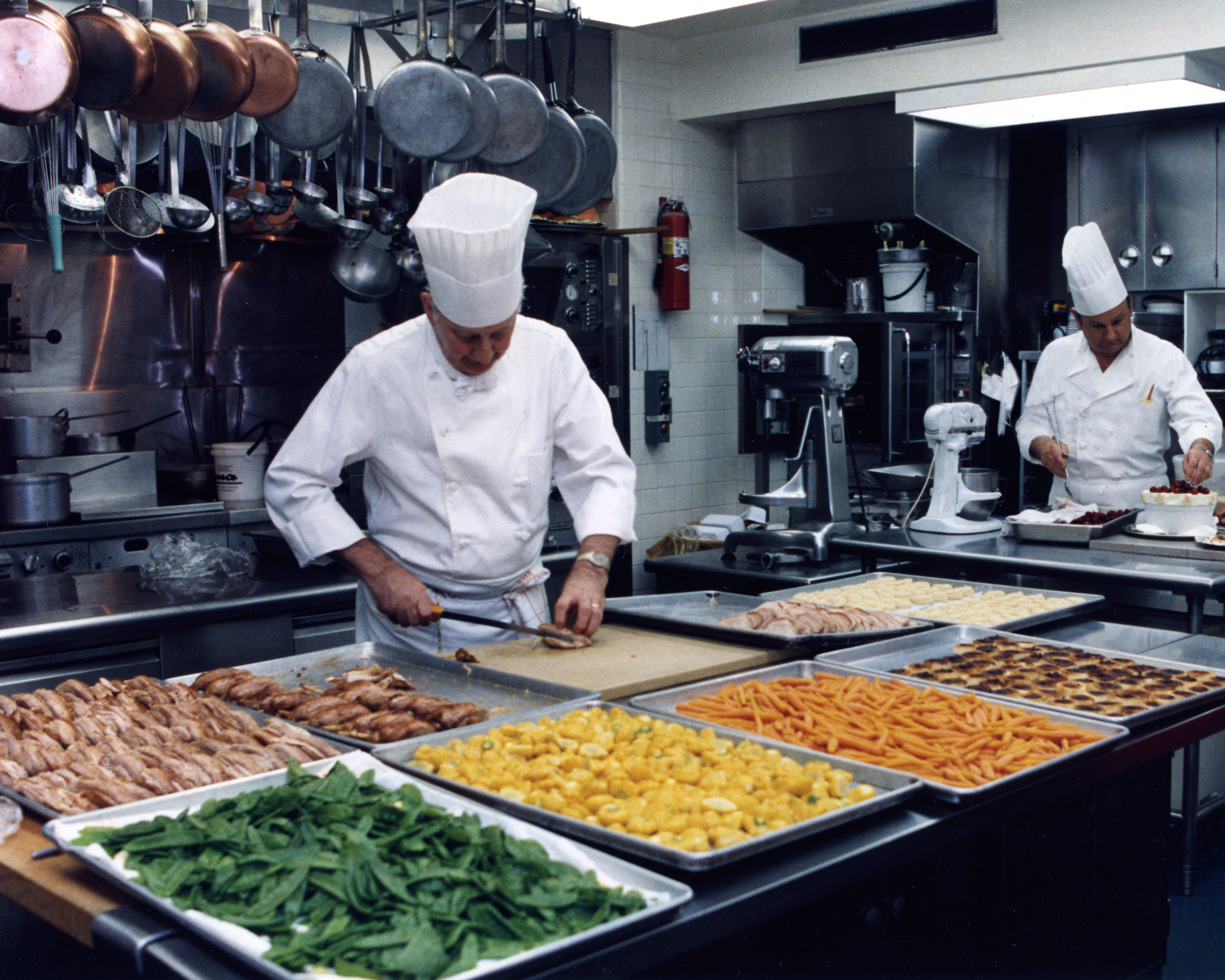
- Hans Raffert (left) in 1992
- Born: March 11, 1927; Hanover, Germany
- Died: March 3, 2005 (aged 77); Alexandria, Virginia, U.S.
- Culinary career
- Cooking style: French cuisine

Hans F. Raffert (March 11, 1927 – March 3, 2005) was a German American chef who was White House Executive Chef from 1988 to 1992. He was the first White House chef to annually build a gingerbread house for the Executive Residence's Christmas holiday decorations.

== Early life and work ==
Raffert was born March 11, 1927, in Hildesheim, Germany. His father was a baker, which sparked his interest in cooking. At the age of 14, as was typical for boys in Germany at the time, he entered an apprenticeship, and chose cooking as a career. He worked four days a week, and spent two days in school. His apprenticeship ended in 1941 when he was 17. With World War II raging, he chose to enlist in the Kriegsmarine, the Nazi German navy. Enlisting meant that he would avoid being conscripted into the Wehrmacht, where he was much more likely to die. As a cook in the navy, he also avoided much of the hunger that afflicted the average German during the latter part of the war.

Raffert trained at a number of hotels and resorts in West Germany after the war. In 1951 he moved to Switzerland, but emigrated to Stockholm, Sweden, in 1952 in order to take advantage of the immense demand for chefs generated by the 1952 Winter Olympics in nearby Oslo, Norway. He spent the next seven and a half years in Sweden, working a various hotels. For three and a half of these years, he worked aboard cruise ships of the Swedish American Line, during which he made three around-the-world cruises.

After spending the summer of 1957 working in York, United Kingdom, he emigrated to the United States even though he spoke very little English. He spent about a year working at hotels in New York City, including the Hotel McAlpin. He then moved to Washington, D.C., where he spent eight years working as the chef de cuisine (executive chef) at the Hotel Washington. He became a naturalized citizen of the United States in 1966.

== White House years ==
In 1969, White House Executive Chef Henry Haller hired Raffert as sous-chef in the White House. Raffert was one of only six staff members on the White House kitchen staff. (The staff consisted of the executive chef, a sous-chef, a kitchen assistant, the pastry chef, a pastry assistant, and a pot-washer.) Due to a delay in obtaining his security clearance, Raffert did not arrive at the White House until the day before Haller was due to leave for vacation. This left Raffert having to oversee planning, preparation, and cooking for a state dinner for West German Chancellor Willy Brandt three days later. In November 1969, Raffert created the first official White House gingerbread house.

Haller retired on October 1, 1987, and was replaced by chef Jon Hill. But Hill proved unpopular with First Lady Nancy Reagan, and resigned on January 8, 1988, after just five months on the job. Raffert was appointed Acting Executive Chef on January 9. Raffert was permanently named to the position on March 3. Although the White House interviewed several candidates, Raffert's experience on the job and the high level of competency he displayed during his one and a half months as Acting Executive Chef convinced the First Lady that Raffert was the right candidate for the job. He was the first White House Executive Chef to be promoted from within the ranks, rather than be brought in from outside the White House. His salary in 1969 was $13,389 a year.

During his time at the White House, as sous-chef and executive chef, Raffert planned, prepared, and cooked for the First Family as well as for state dinners and other formal and informal social functions at the White House. Among some of the major events he cooked for were a "welcome home" for 1,200 former Vietnam War prisoners of war on the South Lawn of the White House on May 24, 1973, and a September 1978 dinner for 1,300 on the South Lawn to celebrate the signing of the Camp David Accords. He enjoyed cooking for the First Family very much. First Lady Pat Nixon liked roast duck (a Raffert favorite as well), while President Jimmy Carter and his family a large meant on Sundays after church and were very much like the average American family. (First Daughter Amy Carter would bake cookies in the White House kitchen, overseen by Raffert.) He also approved of the way First Lady Nancy Reagan handled state dinner menus, personally approving the food and wine choices rather than allowing a committee of staff to argue at length over them. Raffert was the first White House chef to create a gingerbread house as part of the Executive Residence Christmas decorations.

Raffert was 60 when he became Executive Chef, and retired in October 1992 just before he turned 65. A confessed "nibbler" as he cooked, Raffert lost 20 pounds (9.1 kg) after retiring. Frank Ruta, a Washington, D.C.–based chef who trained under Raffert at the White House, later said "Hans was a guy that could do it all. He could do it all, and he could do it all quickly, efficiently, neatly. He was just a walking encyclopedia of classical cooking."

== Personal life and death ==
Raffert's marriage to his first wife, Annemarie (a native of Austria who emigrated to the United States when she was 16 years old), ended in divorce. They had a son, Patrick. Raffert married his second wife, Doris (a medical secretary), in 1976. The couple lived in Alexandria, Virginia.

Raffert died on March 3, 2005, in Alexandria. He was survived by his wife, Doris, and his son, Patrick, as well as a brother, Konrad Raffert of Clarksburg, Maryland. A funeral Mass was held at St. Louis Catholic Church in Alexandria. He was cremated, and inurned at Mount Comfort Cemetery in Alexandria, Virginia.

Preceded by Jon Hill	White House Executive Chef; 1988-1992	Succeeded by Pierre Chambrin
