= Rodolphe Collinet =

Belgian businessman

- Education: Master's degree MBA
- Alma mater: University of Namur; University of Chicago
- Occupation: Business man
- Father: Dominique Collinet

Rodolphe Collinet is a Belgian businessman. He is President Director of Executive Board, Chief Executive Officer, President, Chief Executive Officer of Carmeuse Group and President of Carmeuse Group. He succeeded his father, Dominique Collinet, as CEO of Carmeuse in 2003.

== Biography ==
Rodolphe Collinet is the great-great-grandson of the founder of Carmeuse.

Rodolphe Collinet obtained a master's degree from the University of Namur, and an MBA from the University of Chicago.

In 2012, he signed a $140 million contract to build a limestone processing plant in Oman. In May 2015, he inaugurated the largest photovoltaic power station in Wallonia.

== Other roles ==
- Board member of Innovation Fund SA
- since 2018: Board member and executive director of Golden Lime PLC
