= Jardin d'Acclimatation =

Amusement park in the Bois de Boulogne, Paris

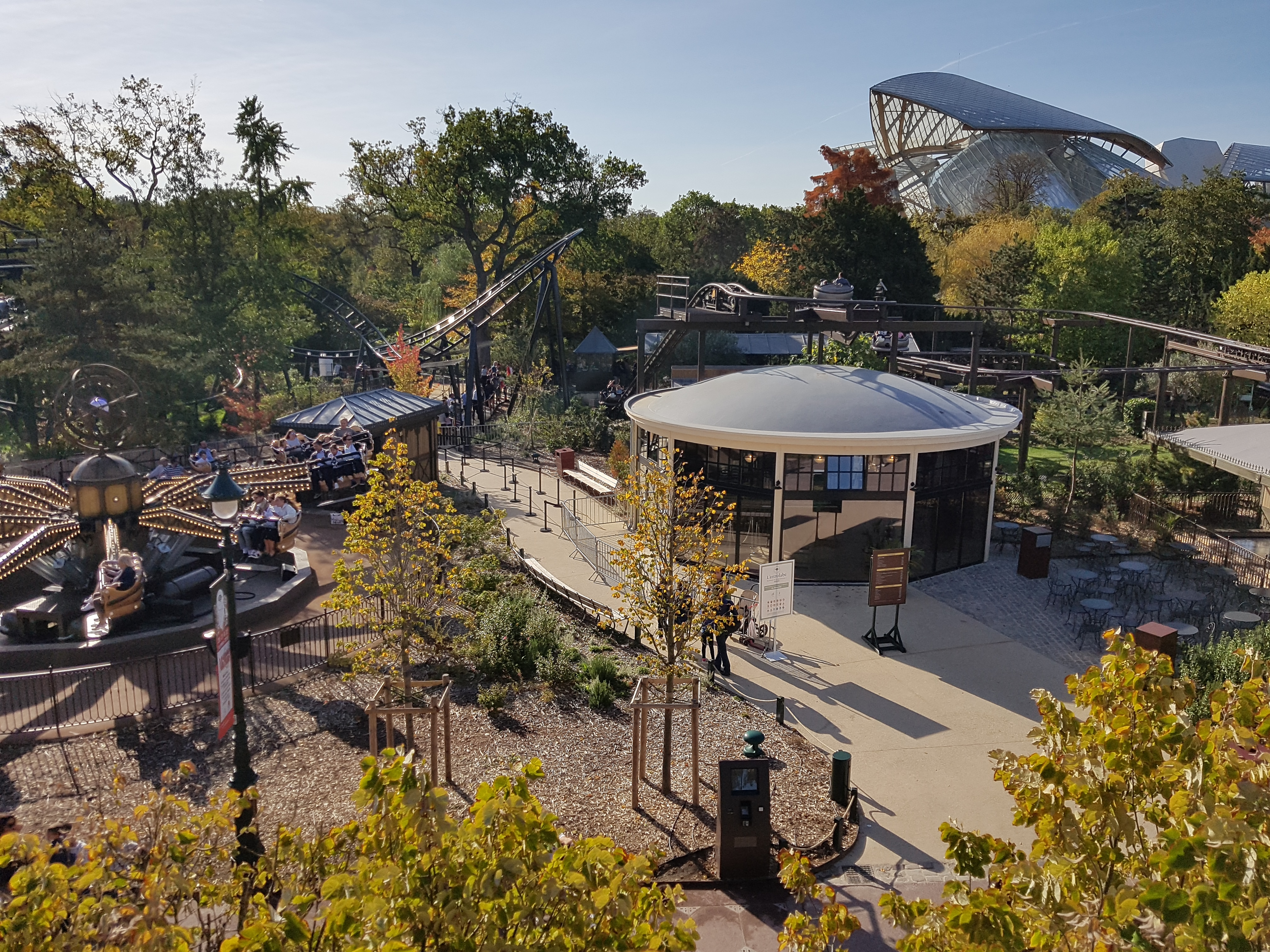
- The Jardin d'Acclimatation with the Fondation Louis Vuitton in the distance
- Interactive map of Jardin d'Acclimatation
- 48°52′39″N 2°15′47″E
- Date opened: 6 October 1860; 165 years ago
- Location: Bois de Boulogne, 16th arrondissement of Paris, France
- Owner: LVMH
- Website: www.jardindacclimatation.fr

The Jardin d'Acclimatation (French: [ʒaʁdɛ̃ daklimatasjɔ̃]) is a 19-hectare (47-acre) children's amusement park in the northern part of the Bois de Boulogne in western Paris. Opened in 1860, it features a number of attractions.

== History ==
Opened on 6 October 1860 by Napoléon III and Empress Eugénie, this Paris zoo was originally known as Jardin Zoologique d'Acclimatation, where plants and animals from the colonies could acclimatise to France's weather conditions. It was directed by Isidore Geoffroy Saint-Hilaire, son of the naturalist Étienne Geoffroy Saint-Hilaire, until his death in 1861.

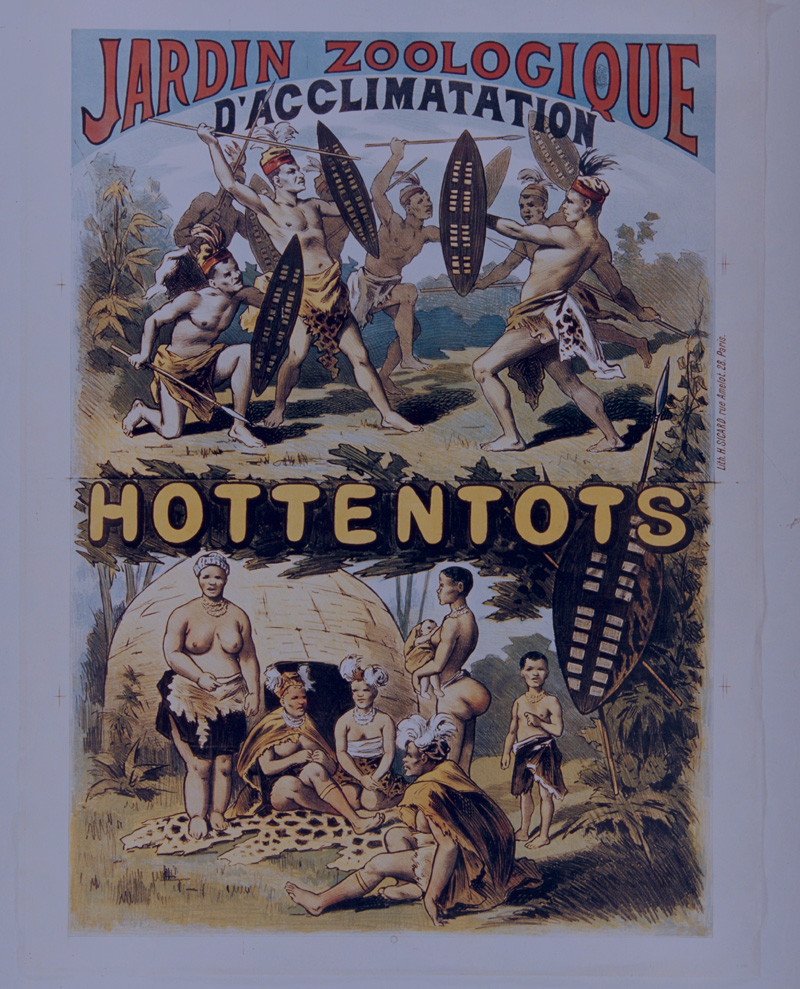
Poster for an anthropological exhibition

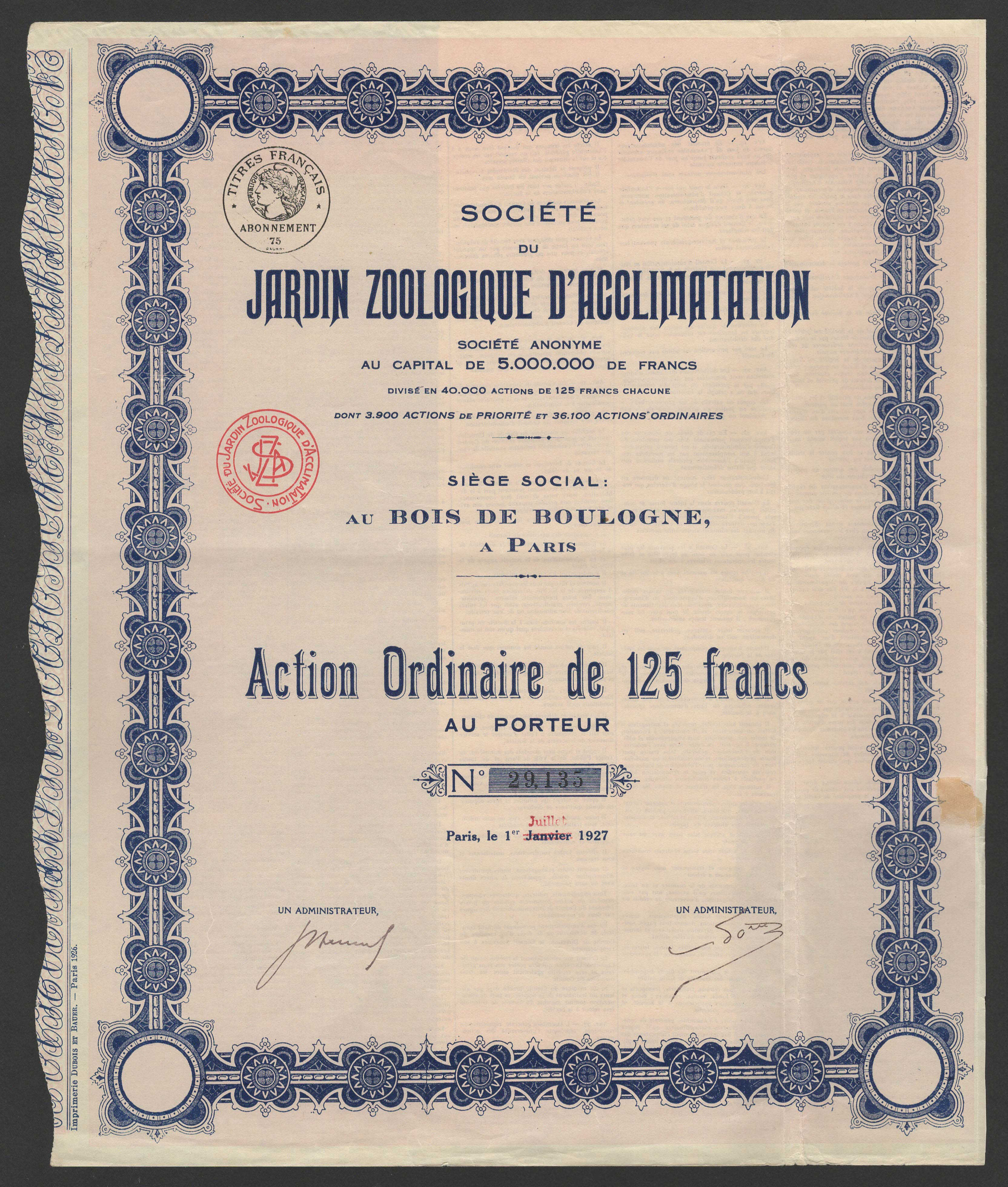
Share of the Soc. du Jardin Zoologique d'Acclimatation S. A., issued 1. July 1927

During the Siege of Paris (1870–1871), many of the animals in the zoo were cooked and served by chef Alexandre Étienne Choron due to wartime deprivation.

From 1877 until 1912, the Jardin Zoologique d'Acclimatation was converted to l'Acclimatation Anthropologique. In mid-colonialism, the curiosity of Parisians was attracted to the customs and lifestyles of foreign peoples. Nubians, Bushmen, Zulus, and many other African peoples were "exhibited" in a human zoo. Indigenous peoples including Sámi people from Norway and Sweden and Inuit from Greenland were also exhibited. The exhibitions were a huge success. The number of visitors to the Jardin doubled, reaching the million mark.

In 1931, around 100 other New Caledonian Kanaks, were put on display at the Jardin d'Acclimatation in Paris, and then sold to another zoo. From 1931 on, the last anthropological exhibition was closed down and since then the zoo - now the Jardin d'Acclimatation - has become a family-oriented leisure park, focusing on children's activities. Among the attractions are many fair-like activities, including mini-rollercoasters, swing rides, and a collection of farm animals and birds.

A miniature road system for children operated by the Paris police was closed in 2008.

== Attractions ==
Plan of the Jardin d'acclimatation, Paris, France.

The park includes an archery range, house of mirrors, miniature-golf course, narrow-gauge train, pony ride, carousels, puppet theater, shooting galleries, and an art museum for children (the Musée en Herbe).

A Seoul Garden (Jardin de Séoul), opened in 2002 to mark the 10th anniversary of the sister-city partnership between Seoul and Paris, is present.
