= Cristeta Comerford =

Filipino-American chef (born 1962)

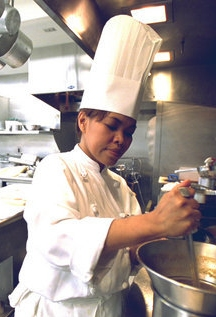
- Born: Cristeta Gomez Pasia; October 27, 1962 (age 63); Sampaloc, Manila, Philippines
- Education: University of the Philippines Diliman (dropped out)
- Spouse: John Comerford
- Children: 1
- Culinary career
- Cooking style: French

Cristeta Pasia Comerford (née Gomez Pasia; born October 27, 1962) is a Filipino-American chef who served as the White House executive chef from 2005 until her retirement in 2024. She is the first woman and first person of Asian origin to hold the post.

== Early life ==
Cristeta Comerford was born as Cristeta Gomez Pasia in Sampaloc, Manila, the Philippines to Honesto Pasia, a public school assistant principal, and Erlinda Gomez. She grew up on Cataluña Street (now G. Tolentino) in Sampaloc, Manila. She completed her secondary education at the Manila Science High School. She attended the University of the Philippines, Diliman in Quezon City, majoring in food technology. However, she left school before completing the degree when she immigrated to the United States at the age of 23.

== Career ==
Comerford's first job was at the Sheraton Hotel near O'Hare International Airport in Chicago, Illinois. She also worked at the Hyatt Regency hotel. After Chicago, she moved to Washington, D.C., and worked as a chef at two restaurants. She additionally spent six months in Vienna as a rotating chef. Comerford was recruited by White House executive chef Walter Scheib III in 1995 to work in the Clinton White House as an assistant chef.

After Scheib resigned in February 2005, Comerford was appointed White House executive chef by First Lady Laura Bush on August 14, 2005. Comerford is the first woman to hold this position. She reportedly was appointed to this position due to her handling of a large dinner that was held in honor of Indian prime minister Manmohan Singh.

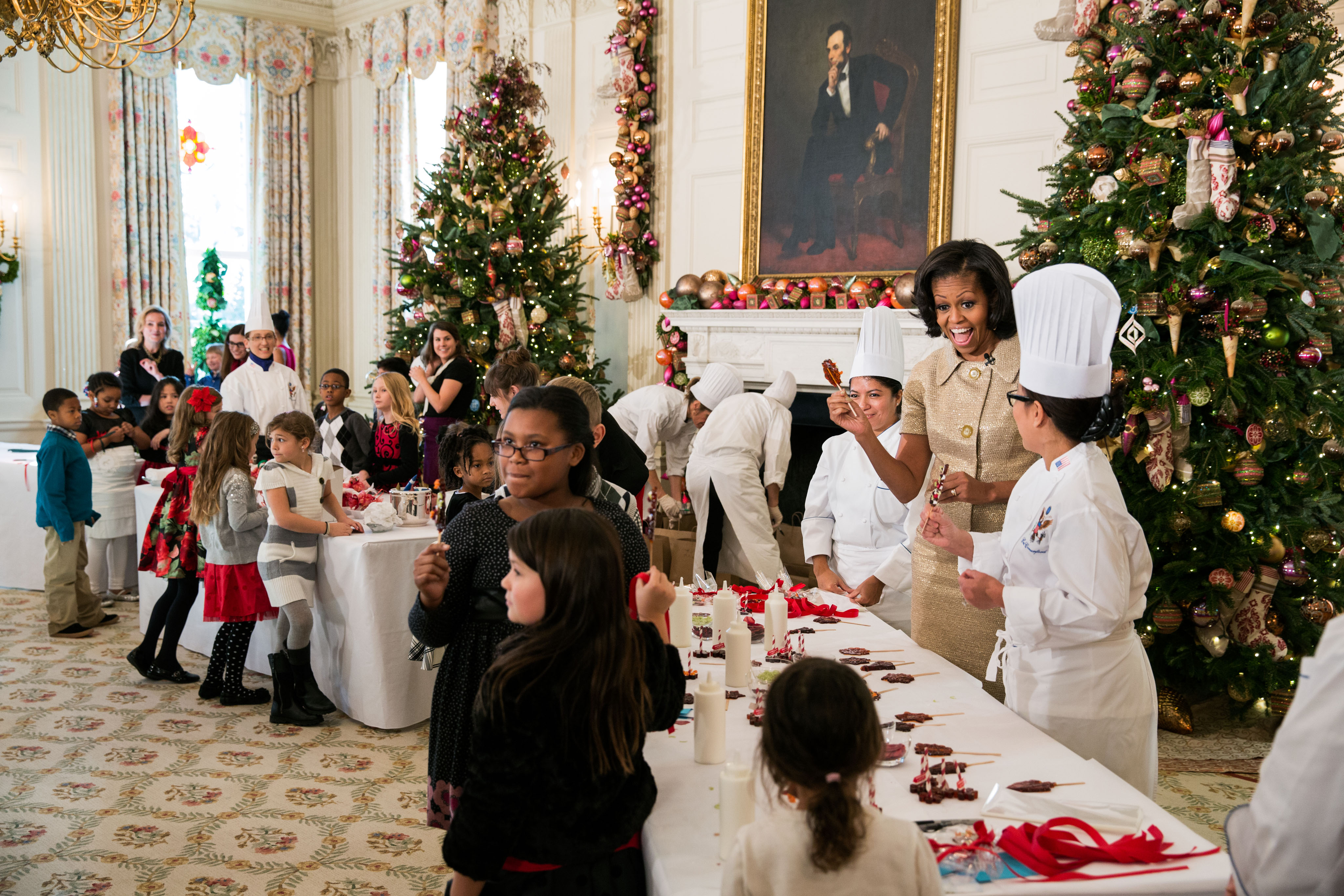
White House executive chef Cris Comerford and children make White House honey tea stirrers, Nov 28, 2012

On January 9, 2009, the Obama transition team announced that Comerford would be retained as the administration's head chef. Michelle Obama stated, "She is also the mom of a young daughter, and I appreciate our shared perspective on the importance of healthy eating and healthy families."

Comerford appeared on a special two-hour episode of Iron Chef America, originally broadcast on January 2, 2010. She was teamed up with Bobby Flay and competed against a team of Emeril Lagasse and Mario Batali.

As chef to a head of state, Comerford was a member of Le Club des Chefs des Chefs.

Comerford retired from the White House in July 2024.

== Personal life ==
Comerford is married to John Comerford, with whom she has a daughter, Danielle. While she worked in the White House, they lived in Columbia, Maryland. After her retirement the couple planned to move to South Florida.

Government offices
| Preceded by Walter Scheib | White House Executive Chef; 2005–2024 | Vacant |
