= Jardin d'Acclimatation railway =

Minimum gauge railway in Paris

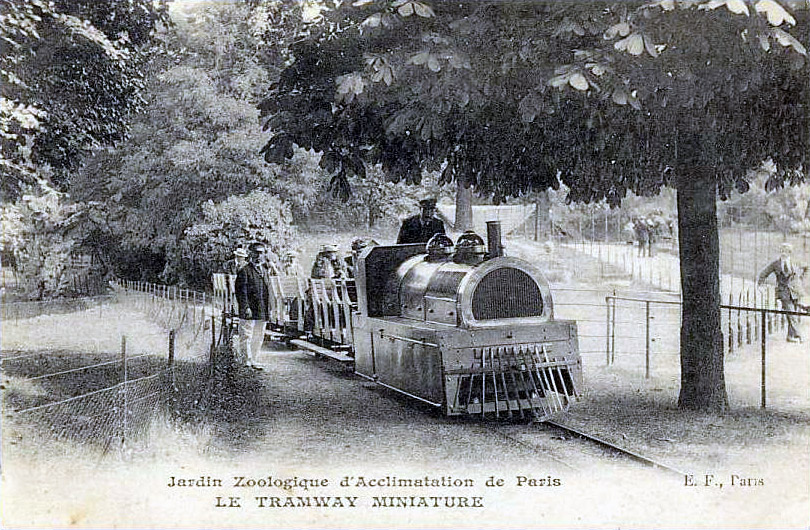
The Jardin d’acclimatation railway, 1920.

The Jardin d'Acclimatation railway is a 500 mm (19 3/4 in) minimum-gauge park railway, located in the Bois de Boulogne in Paris. It was opened in 1878 and connects Porte Maillot and the Jardin d'Acclimatation (zoological gardens), 800 meters apart. It was the first passenger-carrying narrow-gauge railway of France.

== History ==
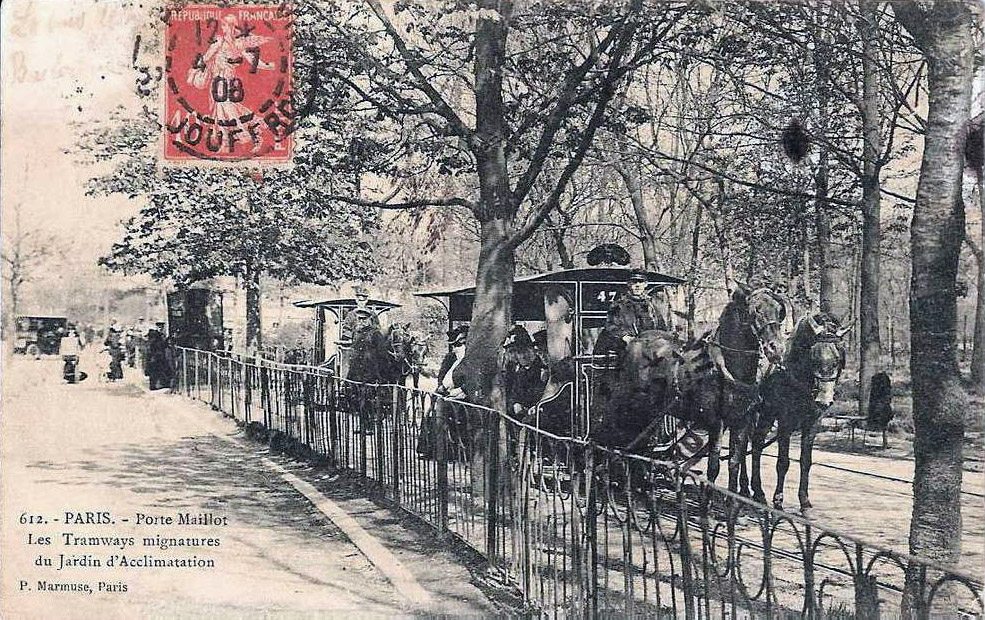
From 1880 to 1910, the carriages were hauled by ponies.

The French narrow-gauge railway pioneer Paul Decauville wanted to experiment with passenger transport using his portable railways, already successfully introduced in the industry and agriculture. For the 1878 Exposition Universelle he proposed to use his concept for the exhibition by a line Trocadéro - Military Academy passing the Champ-de-Mars, but permission was denied. He then offered the same facility at the Zoological Gardens, which was accepted. Two kilometers of railway line at the track gauge of 500 mm (19 3/4 in) was constructed for the transportation of the exhibit visitors over a circular track, having a maximum speed of 15 km/h. The line carried up to 3000 passengers on some Sundays and received a very positive response from the visitors. But for some unknown reason, the network was quickly removed.

In 1880, a new modified line connected the garden to the Porte Maillot. It was constructed by another company and operated as a streetcar line with American vehicles hauled by ponies. These gave way to tractors in 1910. By 1930, the line was shortened at each end. Since then, it continues to link Porte Maillot to the garden, without being altered significantly since then.

== The line ==
The line originally featured a terminus loop at Porte Maillot, crossing the road at the Porte de Sablons, and follows a route through the woods to the garden, which is traversed for its entire length. It was constructed in double track with each track following a slightly different alignment, with a total track length of five kilometers. Curves had a minimum radius of eight to fifteen meters .

In the early 1930s, the line was shortened at both ends. The section within the zoological garden was removed, and the road section to Porte Maillot, where an underground construction was created, required relocating of the terminal along the road at Porte des Sablons.

== Operations ==
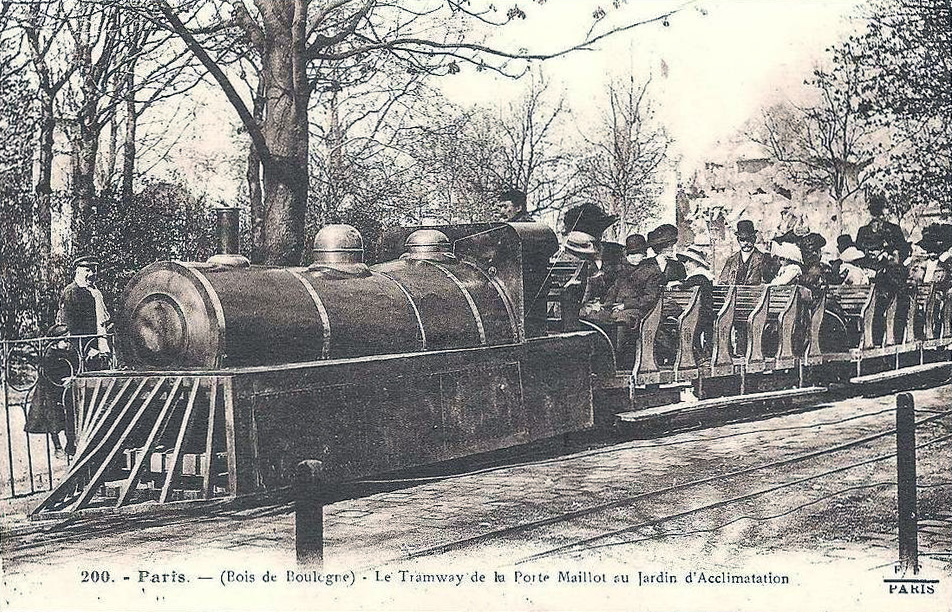
The gasoline locomotives from 1910 have a steam locomotive outline.

Originally, two ponies hauled one or two carriages. Each carriage had eight seats, with passengers sitting back to back on longitudinal seats. In 1901 American newspapers reported that the train was pulled by a locomotive which resembled "a cross between a great Chinese dragon and a sea serpent." Each carriages of the train "formed a joint of the creature's sinuous body" and the seats were "along the sides - back to back." In 1910, a driver's cab was added at the rear of the locomotive. Trains were made up of three to four carriages equipped with crossbenches facing the direction of travel. The appearance of the locomotives has evolved over the years with one resembling Renault taxis, while another retained a more classic look .

In 1945, due to the shortage of gasoline, the gasoline locomotives were replaced with battery-electric road tractors, which probably came from the Universal Exhibition of 1937, with their wheels with tires running outside the rails. The gasoline locomotives were quickly returned to service. In 1960, Renault built seven locomotives with two axles each. Their bodywork was steam outline and brightly decorated. These machines are 3.05 metres (10.0 ft) long and 1.20 metres (3 ft 11 in) wide, weigh five tons and reach 19 kilometres per hour (12 mph). They have 55 horsepower (41 kW) engines. The carriages are those of the 1910s, the only modification being the addition of a small roof in the year 1951. In 2010 new electric locomotives came into service on the railway.

== See also ==
- Decauville
- Minimum-gauge railway
