= Jon Hill (chef) =

American chef

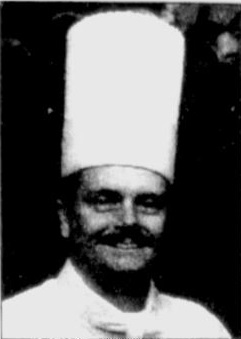
- Jon Hill circa 1987
- Born: c. 1954 (age 71–72); Spokane, Washington, U.S.
- Education: Greenbrier Culinary Apprentice Program; University of Hawaii at Hilo
- Culinary career
- Cooking style: American cuisine

Jon Hill (c. 1954) is an American chef who was White House Executive Chef from October 1, 1987, to January 7, 1988. He was the first American-born chef to serve in the capacity.

== Early life and education ==
Hill was born in Spokane, Washington, about 1954 to Victor M. Hill, a chef and instructor of hotel-motel and restaurant management at Spokane Community College. His grandfather was also a chef.

Hill fell in love with fine cooking at the age of 16. After graduating from high school, he studied restaurant management under his father at Spokane Community College in 1974, then transferred to Portland Community College in 1976. He then entered the three-year Greenbrier Culinary Apprentice Program at The Greenbrier luxury resort near White Sulphur Springs in Greenbrier County, West Virginia, where he was taught classic French cooking by master chef Hermann G. Rusch. Hill excelled at sauces and the presentation of cold food. Rusch later called him the "best of the 18 graduates" of 1977, and had high praise for his skills and attention to detail. He also called Hill one of the best students he ever had. Rodney Stoner, food and beverage director at The Greenbrier, called Hill "definitely one of the outstanding graduates in the history of the school". Hill then enrolled at the University of Hawaii at Hilo, where he received his associate degree in restaurant and food services in 1980. (Note: One source also claims he trained briefly in Switzerland.)

== Professional career ==
=== Early positions ===
Hill's professional career began as a Chef de partie (or station chef) at the Mauna Kea Beach Hotel in Kohala, Hawaii. He was promoted to sous-chef. After five years (Note: One source says it was six years.) at the Mauna Kea Beach Hotel, Hill was transferred to a position as executive sous-chef at the Arizona Biltmore Hotel in Phoenix, Arizona. Kim Dietrich, chef de cuisine (executive chef) at the Mauna Kea Beach Hotel at the time, called him an exciting and all-around chef, a perfectionist, loyal, and extraordinarily gifted at detail work.

After two or three years at the Arizona Biltmore, in September 1986 Hill took a position as the chef de cuisine (executive chef) at the Westin Cypress Creek Hotel in Fort Lauderdale, Florida (which he helped opened). At the Westin Cypress Creek, Hill oversaw a staff of 100 and the preparation and presentation of modern American cuisine in two restaurants. He was noted for his delicately flavored sauces and finishes and for his exquisite skill as sculpting ice and tallow.

Jen Campbell, food and beverage administrator for the entire Westin Hotels chain, praised Hill as gregarious, care-free, and very relaxed. Raymond Sylvester, general manager of the Westin Cypress Creek, called Hill gifted with "a great disposition [and] an extraordinary sense of organization".

=== White House ===
Hill first came to the attention of the White House in 1979. Hill was still a student at the Greenbriar, and his class made a visit to the White House to see its kitchens. White House Executive Chef Henry Haller made Hill's acquaintance at that time. Haller approached Hill about taking the White House job. White House Chief Usher Gary J. Walters also learned about Hill's reputation from chefs and culinary experts around the country, and he visited Hill's kitchen in late July 1987.

After a two-month search, about 20 to 30 unmarried candidates were seriously considered for the job. Hill was one of three or five finalists allowed to audition his cooking skills for First Lady Nancy Reagan. He was chosen for the position of White House Executive Chef about August 19. He won the position largely because Haller endorsed him, and because his colleagues felt he was "exceptionally well-organized...with a flair for imaginative presentation". He was the first native-born American to become White House Executive Chef. Hill oversaw a staff of just three: two sous-chefs and an executive pastry chef.

Hill spent about a month working alongside Haller before assuming the role of Executive Chef on October 1, 1987. His primary job was to cook meals for the First Family. By December 1987, Hill had also overseen the planning, preparation, cooking, and presentation for state dinners for Chaim Herzog, President of Israel, José Napoleón Duarte, President of El Salvador, as well as an extremely important and sensitive state dinner on December 8, 1987 for Mikhail Gorbachev, General Secretary of the Communist Party of the Soviet Union.

Hill's tenure at the White House was short. On January 8, 1988, Hill resigned after First Lady Nancy Reagan expressed significant disapproval of his cooking and presentation. He was replaced by White House assistant chef Hans Raffert.

=== Post-White House ===
After leaving the White House, Hill enrolled at the University of Phoenix, where he received a Bachelor of Science degree in business management. He then received a Master of Arts in Teaching degree from Grand Canyon University. He also received a certification as an Executive Chef from the American Culinary Federation and a certification as a Food and Beverage Executive from the American Hotel & Lodging Educational Institute.

From 1992 to 2002, Hill was chef de cuisine at the luxury Wigwam Resort in Litchfield Park, Arizona, near Phoenix.

In 2002, Hill was appointed director of the Culinary Studies program at Estrella Mountain Community College in Avondale, Arizona. He is a member of the Resort Food Executive Committee, a group of current and former luxury resort chefs de cuisine which discusses, analyzes, and helps to resolve issues and challenges faced by resort chefs.

Preceded by Henry Haller	White House Executive Chef; 1987-1988	Succeeded by Hans Raffert
