= Jean-Louis-François Collinet =

French chef

Jean-Louis-François Collinet (French pronunciation: [ʒɑ̃ lwi fʁɑ̃swa kɔlinɛ]) was a French chef credited with several well-known culinary innovations in the 1830s including Béarnaise sauce and Pommes soufflées.

== Béarnaise sauce ==
Collinet was the head chef at the Henri IV hotel outside of Paris, where he was widely credited as the creator of Béarnaise sauce shortly following the Second French Revolution. Collinet reportedly developed the recipe in 1836 for the opening of his new restaurant Le Pavilion Henri IV. Using the traditional recipe for Hollandaise sauce, he replaced lemon juice with white wine vinegar, and added shallots, chervil, and tarragon. Collinet named the sauce in honor of Béarn, the region of France from which his restaurant's namesake Henry IV originated.

== Pommes soufflées ==
Collinet is also purported to have inadvertently created pommes soufflées on August 24, 1837, a deep-fat fried potato dish which was a predecessor to French fries. It is suggested that Collinet was preparing a meal for Queen Marie-Amélie, whose train was delayed causing his fried sliced potatoes to become cold. The chef is said to have returned the potatoes to the hot oil to reheat them, at which point they became puffed and crispy. The origin of the story is circumstantial.

The Pavilion Henri IV continues to operate as a restaurant in Saint-Germain-en-Laye, France.
