= Luci Baines Johnson =

American businesswoman and philanthropist (born 1947)

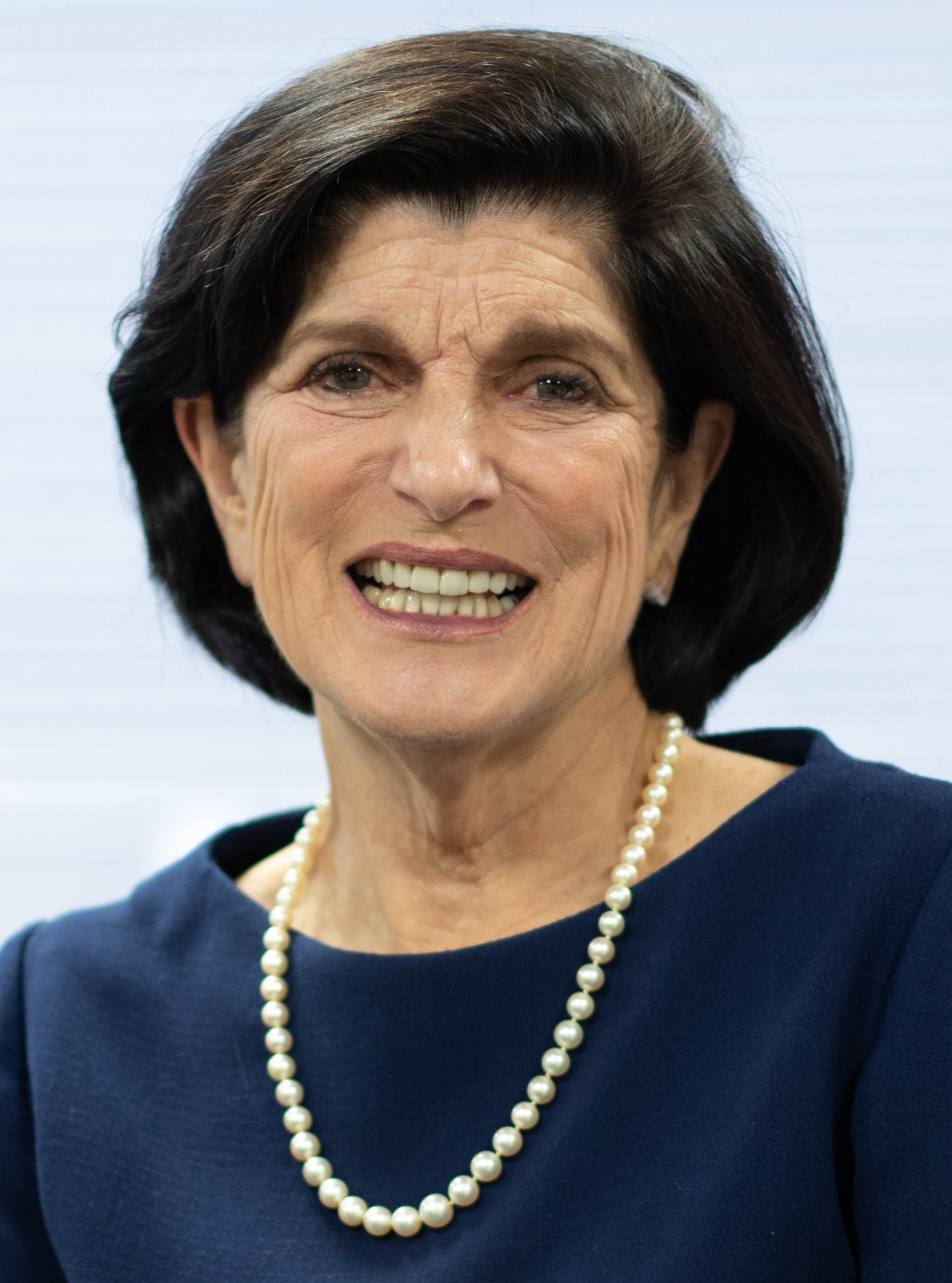
- Johnson in 2023
- Born: Lucy Baines Johnson; July 2, 1947 (age 79); Washington, D.C., U.S.
- Education: Georgetown University; St. Edward's University (BA)
- Occupations: Businesswoman, philanthropist
- Political party: Democratic
- Spouses: Patrick John Nugent (m. 1966; div. 1979); Ian J. Turpin (m. 1984)
- Children: 3
- Parents: Lyndon B. Johnson; Lady Bird Johnson
- Relatives: Johnson family

Luci Baines Johnson (born July 2, 1947) is an American businesswoman and philanthropist. She is the younger daughter of U.S. President Lyndon B. Johnson and his wife, former First Lady Lady Bird Johnson.

== Early years ==
Born in Washington, D.C., Johnson has an older sister Lynda Bird. Johnson's first name was originally spelled "Lucy"; she changed the spelling in her teens as a rebellion against her parents. As her parents both had the initials LBJ, they named their two daughters to have these initials also. Although her father was a member of the Christian Church (Disciples of Christ), her mother converted to the Episcopal Church, and she and her older sister, Lynda Bird, were raised Episcopalian. Johnson converted to Roman Catholicism at the age of 18, when she requested and received conditional baptism. Johnson had been baptized with water and in the name of the Trinity at five months old by an Episcopal priest in Austin, Texas. Her rebaptism caused protests from Episcopalian leaders, which made headlines as Roman Catholic teaching does not require a second baptism of converts Christians baptized using the Trinitarian formula and water.

She was 16 years old when President John F. Kennedy was assassinated in Dallas on November 22, 1963. Johnson heard of the assassination while attending a Spanish class at the National Cathedral School. She was unaware whether her father had been injured as well but realized he had been sworn in as the 36th President of the United States when Secret Service agents showed up on her school campus a few hours later. She later attended Georgetown University School of Nursing and Health Studies but dropped out in 1966 as the school prohibited married students (Johnson married her first husband in August 1966). In 1966, she learned to cook from Zephyr Wright, the White House chef for the Johnson family.

== Career ==
Since 1993, Johnson has been the chairman of the board and manager of LBJ Asset Management Partners, a family office, as well as chairman of the Board of BusinesSuites, a national operator of executive suites, which she co-founded with her husband in 1989. She received a BLS in Communication from St. Edward's University in 1997.

She is on the board of directors of the LBJ Foundation and has served on multiple civic boards, raising funds for The Lady Bird Johnson Wildflower Center and the American Heart Association, acting as trustee of Boston University, and as a member of the advisory board of the Center for Battered Women.

== Personal life ==
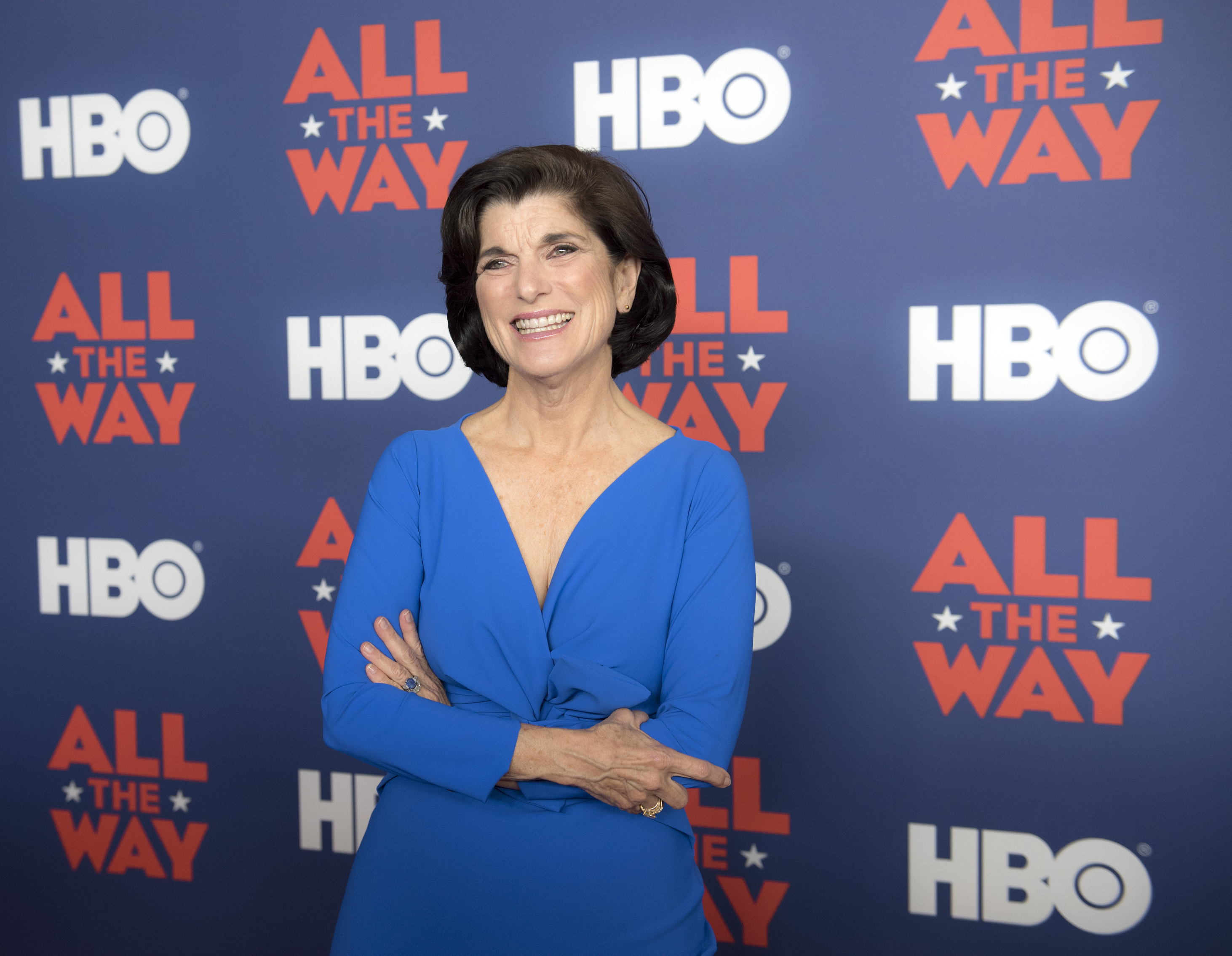
Johnson at the All the Way movie premiere at the LBJ Presidential Library in 2016

On August 6, 1966, Johnson married Air National Guardsman Patrick John Nugent (b. 1943) in front of 700 guests at the National Shrine of the Immaculate Conception in Washington, D.C. The wedding was broadcast on television (drawing 55 million viewers) and was featured on the August 19, 1966, cover of Life magazine.

Through her first marriage, Johnson has four children: Patrick Lyndon (b. 1967), Nicole Marie (b. 1970), Rebekah Johnson, and Claudia Taylor (b. 1976).

The couple later divorced, and the marriage was annulled by the Catholic Church in August 1979.

On March 3, 1984, she married Ian J. Turpin (b. 1944), a Scottish-born Canadian financier. He is president of LBJ Asset Management Partners at LBJ Ranch. Through that marriage, she has a stepson.

On election night of the U.S. 2026 midterms, Johnson celebrated the victories of Gina Hinojosa and James Talarico, the latter having been elected to her father's previous Senate seat.

=== Health issues ===
In April 2010, Johnson was diagnosed with Guillain–Barré syndrome, a rare autoimmune disorder affecting the peripheral nervous system, after a mild viral illness that presented with a sore throat. She was flown to the Mayo Clinic in Rochester, Minnesota, to begin treatment. Johnson returned to Austin in May 2010. Her doctor called her case "less severe than usual," and she experienced a full recovery.
