= Henry Haller =

Swiss American chef (1923–2020)

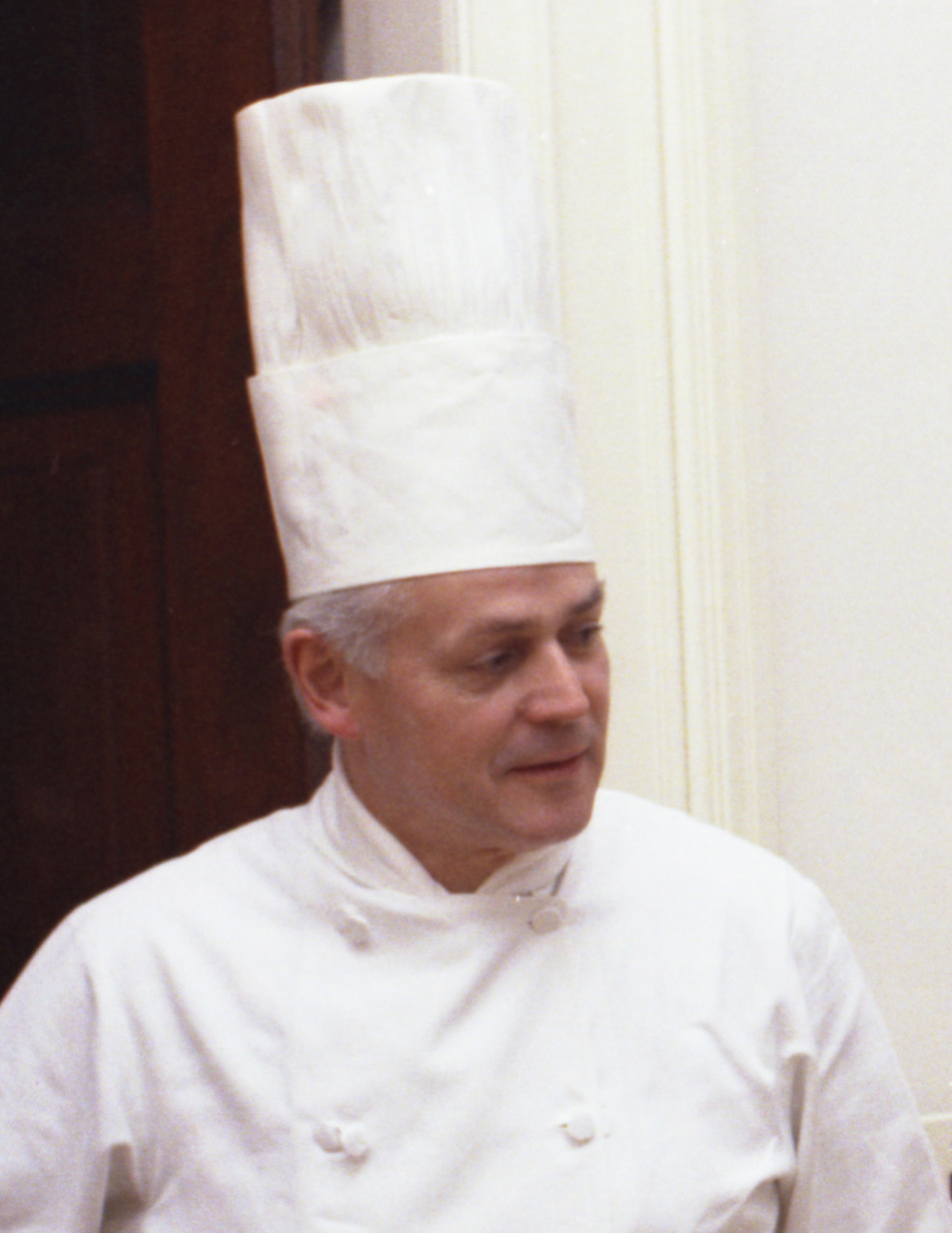
- Henry Haller in 1974
- Born: January 10, 1923; Altdorf, Switzerland
- Died: November 7, 2020 (aged 97); Rockville, Maryland, U.S.
- Education: Apprenticed at Park Hotel, Davos; Hotel Training School, Lucerne; trained at Hotel Des Balances, Lucerne; trained at Hotel Belle-Vue-Palace, Bern; trained at Grand Hotel, Bürgenstock
- Spouse: Carole Itjen Haller
- Culinary career
- Cooking style: French

Henry Haller (January 10, 1923 – November 7, 2020) was a Swiss-American chef who served as Executive Chef of the White House from 1966 to 1987. Haller's death was announced on November 9, 2020.

== Early life ==
Haller was born in Altdorf, Switzerland, in 1923. He was of French descent on his mother's side and German descent on his father's. His father was manager of a factory and loved food, and as a young boy Haller loved to cook. His mother planted a large kitchen garden, and as a child Haller would fetch fresh vegetables from the garden and watch as she cooked them. It was his father who encouraged him to be a chef. Haller recalls that when he was 14 years old, his father said, "Henry, why don't you be a chef? You can travel all over the world. And you will never have to worry about a job. People everywhere have to eat."

Haller enrolled in an apprenticeship when he was 16 years old, and trained at the famed Park Hotel in the ski resort town of Davos, Switzerland. After graduating from high school at the age of 18, he served in the Swiss Army, and although World War II was raging he never saw combat. Discharged at the age of 20, he spent several years working at the exclusive Hotel Des Balances in Lucerne, where he attended the Hotel Training School—considered one of the best cooking academies in the world. He then moved to the five-star Hotel Belle-Vue-Palace in Bern, and then the Grand Hotel in Bürgenstock. While working there as chef tournant (filling in as needed on stations in the kitchen), the hotel owner asked if he would move to Canada to cook at another company-owned property, and Haller readily agreed.

== Move to America ==
Haller had longed to follow other European chefs and live in the United States, but he first emigrated at the age of 25 to Montreal, Quebec, Canada, in 1948, where he practiced his skills as the chef entremetier at the exclusive Ritz-Carlton Montreal, preparing appetizers, soups, vegetables, pastas, potatoes, and eggs.

Haller emigrated to the United States in 1953, where he worked as the chef saucier at the Royal Palms Inn in Phoenix, Arizona. After a year, he took a position as the chef de cuisine (executive chef) at the Dellwood Country Club in Rockland County, New York (near New York City). He worked there for four years before becoming chef de cuisine at the Ambassador Hotel (later known as the Sheraton-East Hotel) in New York City. After three years, Haller moved to the Hotel Hampshire House in Manhattan.

== White House ==
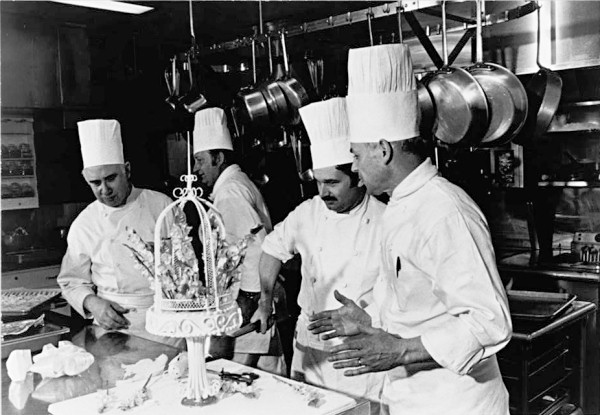
Haller (far right) working on the Nixon-Cox wedding cake in 1971.

Lyndon B. Johnson had stayed at the Ambassador Hotel when he was Vice President of the United States, and enjoyed Haller's cooking. Johnson became President of the United States in November 1963 after the assassination of John F. Kennedy. The White House Executive Chef at that time was René Verdon, who had been hired by the Kennedys. Verdon resigned at the end of 1965 in a dispute with President Lyndon B. Johnson over the cuisine being offered at the White House. Haller applied for the position, and was interviewed on January 1, 1966, in the White House by First Lady Lady Bird Johnson.

Haller's appointment was announced on January 20, 1966. His first day on the job was February 1, at which time he made $10,000 a year. Haller was a probationary chef for the first six months of his tenure at the White House. During this time he lived on the third floor of the White House. Haller had oversight over three White House kitchens: The main kitchen on the ground floor, the family kitchen on the second floor, and a sous-kitchen on the mezzanine level of the sub-basement. (A stove existed in what used to be a former kitchen on the Third Floor as well, although it was rarely used.) He had a staff of seven or eight, two of which worked in the sous-kitchen.

During his tenure at the White House, Haller oversaw the planning, preparation, and cooking for three First Family weddings: The marriage of Luci Baines Johnson to Patrick Nugent in August 1966, the marriage of Lynda Bird Johnson to Chuck Robb in December 1967, and the marriage of Tricia Nixon to Edward F. Cox in June 1971. He oversaw the design and preparation of wedding cakes for all three events.

In 1976, Haller oversaw food preparation for White House events in honor of the United States Bicentennial. For much of 1976, the Ford administration had a normal schedule of one or two state dinners a month. But in June and July, Haller was preparing three or four state dinners each week. Because the federal government shifted the start of its fiscal year from May to October, Haller had little money to bring on additional staff to assist with the preparations and cooking. At the state dinner for Queen Elizabeth II of the United Kingdom, Haller prepared a state dinner for 250, which was served on the South Lawn of the White House under a marquee.

One of Haller's more difficult events was the dinner in September 1978 on the South Lawn to celebrate the signing of the Camp David Accords. Haller was given just a week to plan, prepare, and cook a dinner for 1,300 people, an event which Rosalynn Carter's press secretary, Mary Holt, called "a nightmare".

== Retirement ==
By 1987, Haller was making $58,000 a year. He announced his retirement on June 6, 1987, effective October 1, just in time for his 65th birthday.

In retirement, Haller developed recipes for the liquor company Cointreau, and briefly advised the Grand Union supermarket chain regarding the development of fresh and frozen store-brand gourmet meals.

== Personal life ==
While working at the Dellwood Country Club, Haller met Carole Itjen, a dining room worker at a hotel on Martha's Vineyard. The couple married, and had four children.

Haller died on November 7, 2020, in Gaithersburg, Maryland.

== Bibliography ==
- Haller, Henry; Aronson, Virginia (1987). The White House Family Cookbook. New York: Random House. ISBN 9780394556574.
- Henderson, Jeff; Ganeshram, Ramin (2011). America I Am: Pass It Down Cookbook. New York: Smiley Books. ISBN 9781401931353.

Preceded by René Verdon	White House Executive Chef; 1966—1987	Succeeded by Jon Hill
