= Béarnaise sauce =

Sauce made of clarified butter and egg yolk

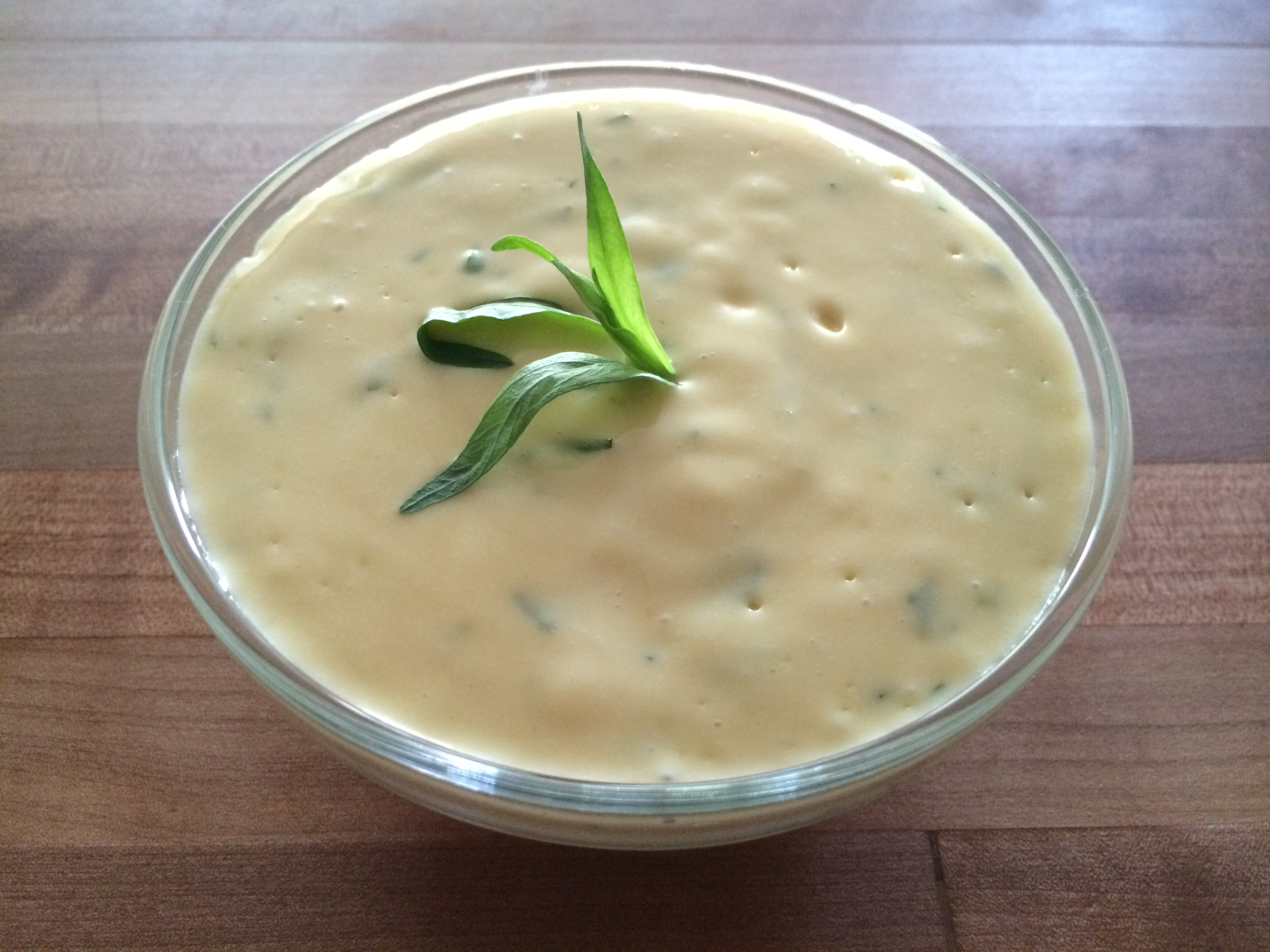
- Type: Sauce
- Place of origin: France
- Main ingredients: Egg yolk, clarified butter, white wine vinegar, herbs

Béarnaise sauce (/bɛərˈneɪz/; French: [be.aʁ.nɛz]; Occitan: Bearnesa) is a sauce made of clarified butter, egg yolk, white wine vinegar, and herbs. It is regarded as a "child" of hollandaise sauce. The difference is in the flavoring: béarnaise uses shallot, black pepper, and tarragon, while hollandaise uses white pepper or a pinch of cayenne.

The sauce's name derives from the province of Béarn, France. It is a traditional sauce for steak.

== History ==
According to a common explanation, the sauce was accidentally invented by the chef Jean-Louis-François Collinet, the accidental inventor of puffed potatoes (pommes de terre soufflées), and served at the 1836 opening of Le Pavillon Henri IV, a restaurant at Saint-Germain-en-Laye. The restaurant was in the former residence of Henry IV of France, a gourmet himself, who was from Béarn.

Although the sauce is a French invention, it became popular in the Nordic countries in the late 20th century, where it forms a major part of local steak cuisine with steaks and fries, and is occasionally used there as topping on pizza, whether as part of the pizza or as a cold dressing put on afterwards.

== Preparation ==
As with hollandaise, there are several methods for preparing béarnaise.

The most common method of preparation uses a bain-marie, whisking to a temperature of 66 °C (150 °F), where a reduction of vinegar is used to acidify the yolks.

Auguste Escoffier and other sources call for a reduction of wine, vinegar, shallots, fresh chervil, fresh tarragon, and crushed peppercorns (later strained out).

Alternatively, the flavorings may be added to a finished hollandaise (without lemon juice). Joy of Cooking describes a blender preparation with the same ingredients.

== Derivatives ==
- Sauce Choron (also called béarnaise tomatée) uses tomato purée instead of herbs. It is named after Alexandre Étienne Choron.
- Sauce Foyot (also called Valois) is béarnaise with meat glaze (glace de viande) added.
- Sauce Colbert is Sauce Foyot with the addition of reduced white wine.
- Sauce Paloise uses mint instead of tarragon.

== See also ==
- List of sauces
- Steak sauce
