= Alexandre Étienne Choron =

French chef

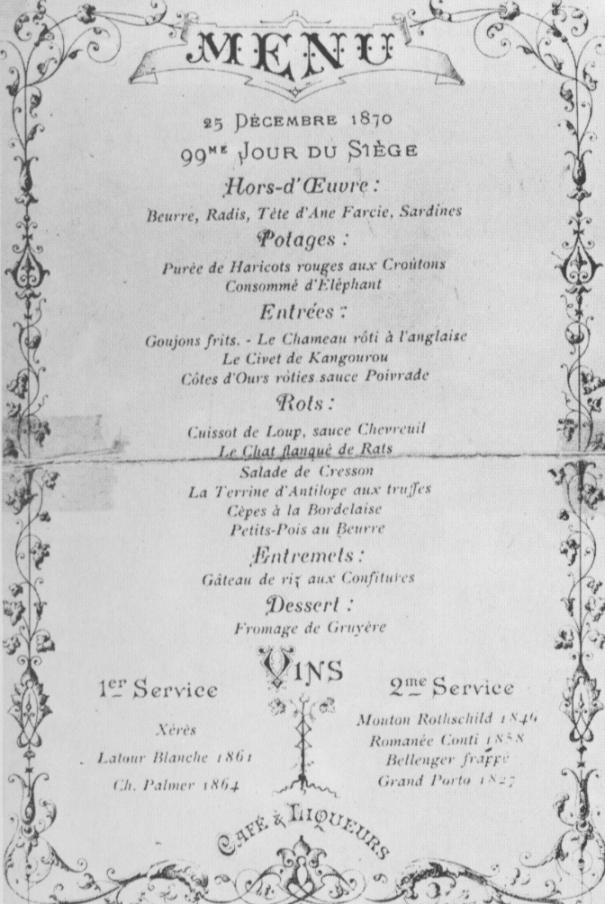
Choron's 1870 Christmas menu at the restaurant Voisin.

Alexandre Étienne Choron (1837 in Caen, Calvados – 1924) was a French chef.

As chef de cuisine of the celebrated restaurant Voisin on the rue Saint Honoré, Choron is best known for his invention of Choron sauce, a sauce béarnaise enriched with tomato concentrate before reduction.

Choron is also remembered for his dishes served during the Siege of Paris by the Prussians, which began on 19 September 1870. During the siege, Parisians were reduced to eating cats, dogs, and rats. The bourgeois were not content to eat such low animals, and demand at the de luxe restaurants remained high. As food reserves dwindled, these restaurants, including Voisin, improvised. Choron eyed the animals kept at the local zoo, and served exotic animal dishes at Voisin. For the midnight Christmas meal of 1870, Choron proposed a menu principally composed of the best parts of the animals kept in the Jardin d'acclimatation (one of Paris' zoos) – stuffed head of donkey, elephant consommé, roasted camel, kangaroo stew, bear shanks roasted in pepper sauce, wolf in deer sauce, cat with rat, and antelope in truffle sauce – has become legendary. The menu's wines were Mouton-Rothschild 1846, Romanée-Conti 1858 and Château Palmer 1864.

Choron also garnered fame for his dishes containing elephant: Trompe d'éléphant in sauce chasseur and Éléphant bourguignon. After the elephant at the Jardin d'acclimatation graced the Christmas table, the two elephants (Castor and Pollux) at the Paris' jardin zoologique were consumed on 31 December 1870 at Voisin. In early January, it was the elephant at the Jardin des Plantes (Paris' botanical garden) which was sent to the abattoir. It was bought by Choron for his restaurant at the price of 15 francs per pound. By 13 January, Voisin was out of elephant meat and substituted horse. The siege was lifted two weeks later.
