= Carmeuse =

Belgian limestone mining company

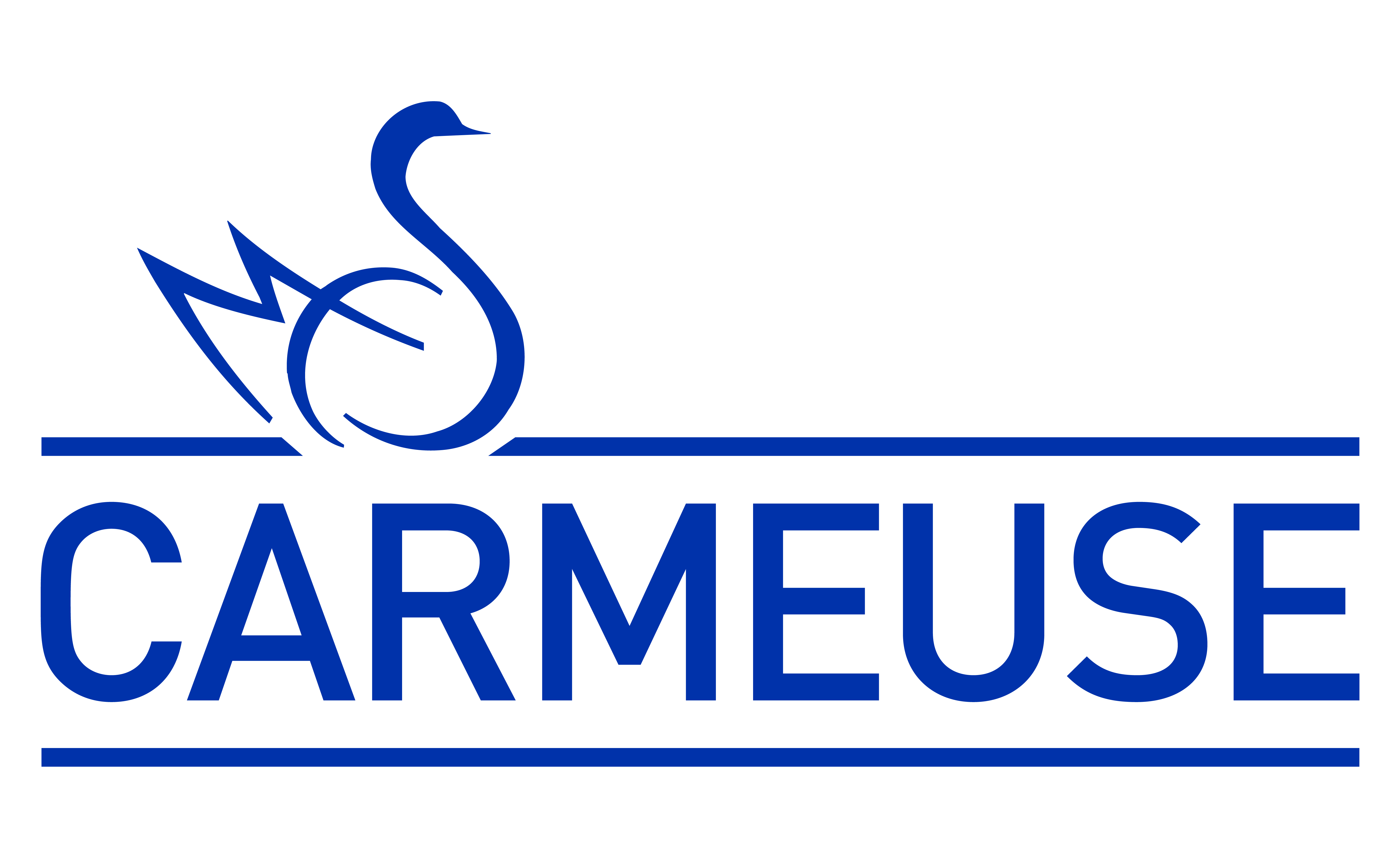
- Type: Private
- Industry: Mining Company
- Founded: 1860
- Headquarters: Louvain-la-Neuve, Belgium
- Key people: Sébastien Dossogne (Chief Executive Officer)
- Products: High calcium lime, High dolomitic lime, calcium hydroxide and limestone
- Revenue: €2.5 billion (2025)
- Number of employees: 6,300
- Website: www.carmeuse.com

Carmeuse is a Belgian mining company which produces lime and limestone. The Carmeuse Group has production facilities in Europe, North America and Africa. Its head office is located in Louvain-la-Neuve and the company Chief Executive Officer is Sébastien Dossogne.

== History ==
The company was founded in 1860 in the city of Liège. Over the years the company expanded across Western Europe into Italy, France and the Netherlands, Central Europe and Eastern Europe into Slovakia, the Czech Republic, Hungary, Romania, Bosnia and Turkey and North America into the United States and Canada and also in Africa and Asia.

== Activity ==
Carmeuse has developed many applications for industrial uses (steel, non-ferrous, chemicals, paintings, paper, carpets), for the agro-food industry (human food and animal feed), for the building industry (plasters and mortars, aerated autoclave concrete, calcium silicate bricks) and for environment applications (water and sludge treatment, flue-gas desulfurization).

Carmeuse quarry

== News ==
October 2007 – In a friendly deal with its partner, the Carmeuse Group takes over the control of Ozture Kimtas in Turkey

October 2007 – Carmeuse has been selected as the winning bidder for Oglebay Norton

September 2016 – Carmeuse signs its entry into South East Asia
