= René Verdon =

French-born American chef (1924–2011)

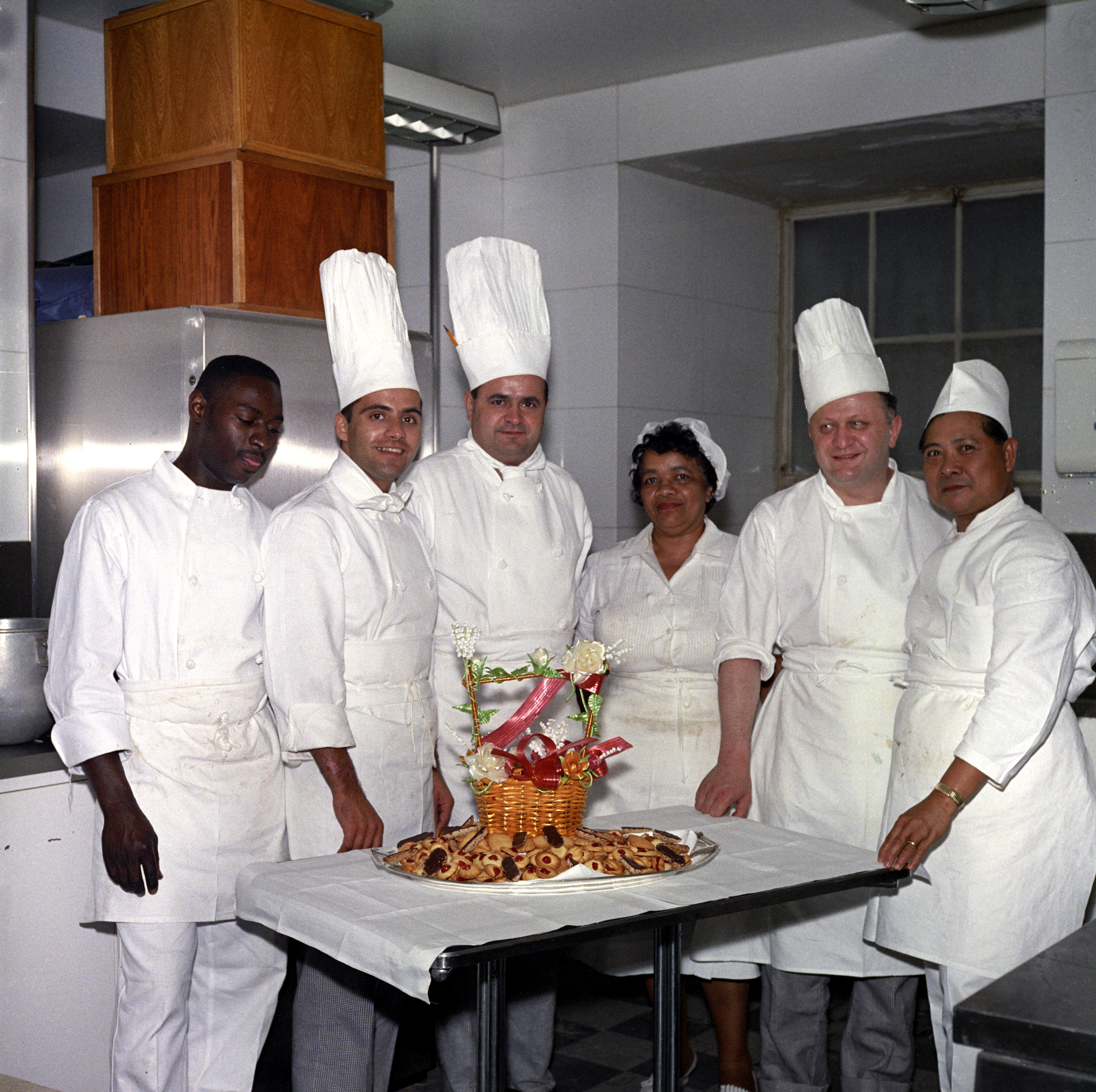
- René Verdon (third from left) poses with White House kitchen staff on May 3, 1962
- Born: June 29, 1924; Pouzauges, Third French Republic
- Died: February 2, 2011 (aged 86); San Francisco, California, U.S.
- Education: Trained at Le Berkeley, Paris, and Hôtel Normandy, Deauville
- Spouse: Yvette Verdon
- Culinary career
- Cooking style: French
- Previous restaurant: Le Trianon

René Verdon (French pronunciation: [ʁəne vɛʁdɔ̃]; June 29, 1924 – February 2, 2011) was a French-born American chef and author. Verdon was the chef for the White House during the administrations of John F. Kennedy and Lyndon B. Johnson. Verdon was hired by First Lady Jacqueline Kennedy in 1961.

== Early life ==
Verdon was born in Pouzauges, Vendee, western France in 1924. His family owned a bakery and pastry shop. He had two older brothers, a baker and pâtissier, this is where he got his inspiration to become a chef. At the age of 13, Verdon began an apprenticeship after which he worked in several prestigious restaurants in Paris and Deauville including Le Berkeley. He emigrated to the United States in 1958.

Once in New York, Verdon found work at the Essex House restaurant as well as La Caravelle and the Carlyle Hotel. While at La Caravelle Verdon was recommended to Jacqueline Kennedy by head chef Roger Fessaguet.

== The White House ==
The First Lady originally hired Verdon temporarily to deal with the high demands of luncheons after the inauguration. After a few months Verdon was given a permanent position in which he received a $10,000 a year salary along with full room and board. Verdon was credited with changing the standard of food served by the White House. Meals had previously been supplied by either outside caterers or Navy stewards and were not known for their high standard.

Verdon's first commission was an informal luncheon the Kennedys' hosted for Princess Grace and Prince Rainier of Monaco. He used ingredients such as crab, spring lamb and strawberries. His first official meal was for sixteen guests including British prime minister Harold Macmillan. Verdon served a menu of trout in Chablis and sauce Vincent, beef filet au jus and artichoke bottoms Beaucaire as well as his own dessert of meringue filled with raspberries chocolate.

He continued his role as White House chef after the 1963 assassination of President Kennedy and began working for President Johnson. However creative differences rose after a Texan food coordinator hired by Johnson began to supply Verdon with canned and frozen vegetables to keep White House costs down. He often spoke out about the food choices of the Johnsons, once saying to The Washington Post, "You can eat at home what you want, but you do not serve barbecued spareribs at a banquet with the ladies in white gloves." He resigned from his post in 1965 after he was asked to prepare a cold garbanzo bean puree, a dish which he reportedly detested regardless of its temperature.

== After the White House ==
After leaving the White House, Verdon began to demonstrate kitchen appliances before opening up the restaurant Le Trianon in San Francisco, California. Le Trianon became one of America's finest French restaurants of the 1970s and 1980's, it was in operation from 1972 until 1985. He was a classical French chef that did not appreciate using too many new ingredients and food fads, such as the popular 1980s salads made of flowers and arugula. He stated in an interview, "I think California cooking is crazy, Here they don't have any basics. They are always trying something new. Everything is mixed up."

Verdon produced a cookbook titled The White House Chef Cookbook, first published in 1965. Over 500 recipes are interspersed with happy anecdotes of his time in the Kennedy White House interacting with the First Family.

== Death ==
Verdon died on February 2, 2011 at the age of 86. The cause of death was reported by his wife to be leukemia.
