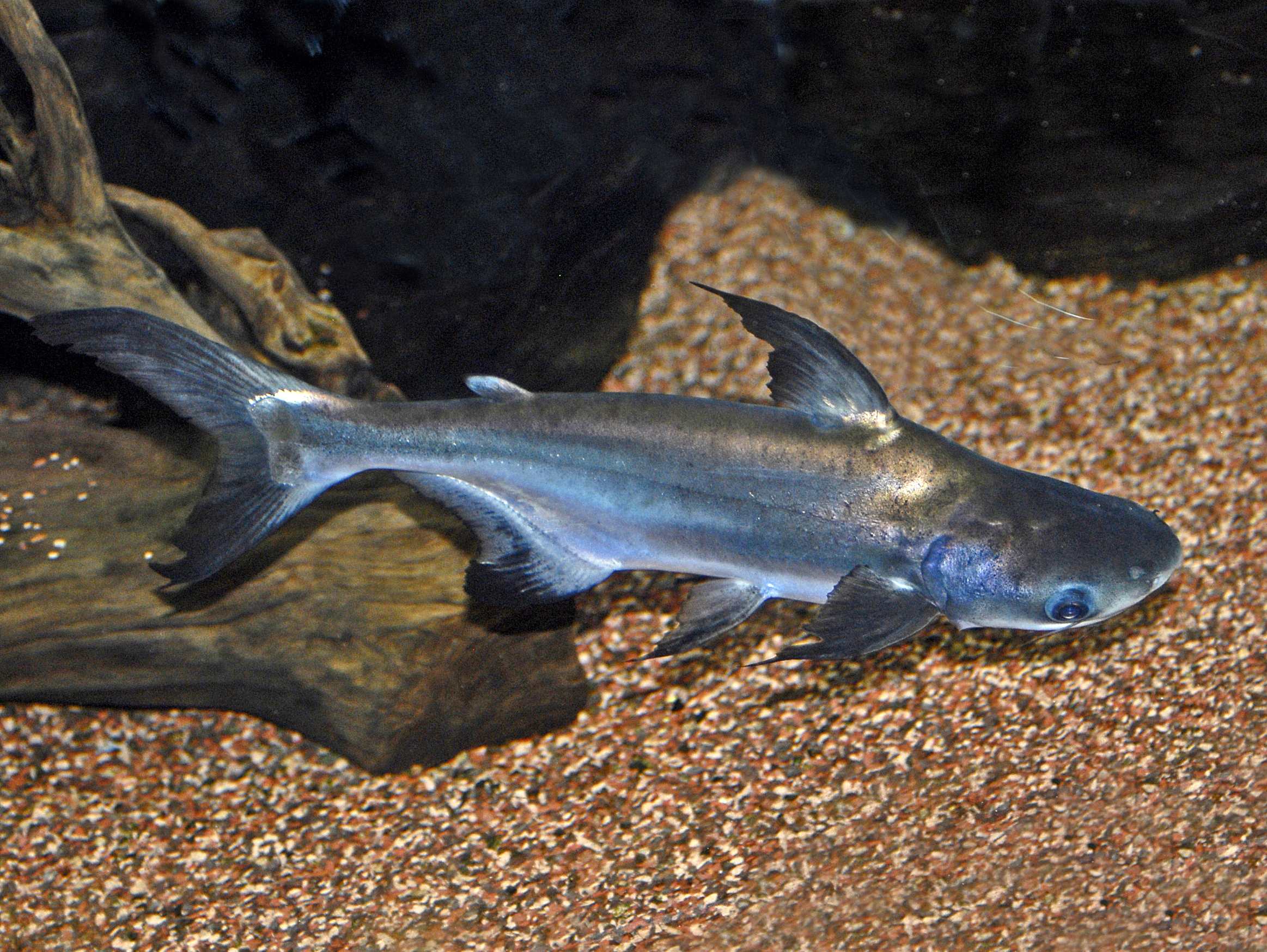
- Pangasius sanitwongsei

Scientific classification
- Kingdom: Animalia
- Phylum: Chordata
- Class: Actinopterygii
- Division: Teleostei
- Order: Siluriformes
- Family: Pangasiidae
- Genus: Pangasius; Valenciennes, 1840

Type species
- Pangasius pangasius Hamilton, 1822

Species
- See text.

Synonyms
- Pseudopangasius Bleeker, 1862; Neopangasius Popta, 1904; Sinopangasius Chang & Wu, 1965

= Pangasius =

Genus of fishes

Pangasius is a genus of medium-large to very large shark catfishes native to fresh water in South and Southeast Asia. The term "pangasius" is sometimes used to specifically refer to the commercially important basa fish, P. bocourti.

== Taxonomy ==
In 1993, Pangasius was one of two extant genera (along with Helicophagus) in the family Pangasiidae. At this point, it was split into four subgenera. Pangasius (Pangasianodon) included P. gigas and P. hypophthalmus and was diagnosed by the absence of mandibular barbels, the absence of teeth in adults and the presence of a single-lobed swimbladder. Pangasius (Pteropangasius) included P. micronema and P. pleurotaenia and was typified by four lobes in the swimbladder and with multiple segments in the last lobe. Pangasius (Neopangasius) included P. nieuwenhuisii, P. humeralis, P. lithostoma, P. kinabatanganensis, and typically had palatal teeth arranged in a single large patch and high vertebral counts. Pangasius (Pangasius) was the final subgenus and had no unique features, including the remaining species. These subgeneric classifications were confirmed in 2000 except for Neopangasius, found to be polyphyletic and to be part of Pangasius (Pangasius), thus leaving three subgenera.

Since then, the subgenera have been variably recognized as separate. P. gigas and P. hypophthalmus have been classified in the genus Pangasianodon, and P. micronemus and P. pleurotaenia in the genus Pseudolais (with Pteropangasius as a junior synonym).

In 2011, Pangasius was sixth in the National Fisheries Institute's "Top 10" list of the most consumed seafood in the United States. The Top 10 is based on tonnage of fish sold. According to the NFI, this mild-flavored white-fleshed fish is farmed in Asia, and is being used increasingly in food service. It is finding its way onto restaurant menus and into stores, as well, where one may see it called basa, tra, or swai. They are either called Panga, Pangas or Pangasius. In Malaysia and Indonesia, Pangasius are called Ikan Patin, while Malaysian Chinese call Pangasius 巴丁鱼. Some species like Pangasius nasutus, Pangasius djambal and Pangasius sanitwongsei are expensive food fish in Malaysia, Pangasius sanitwongsei is also a common fish in aquarium trade and sport fishing.

=== Species ===
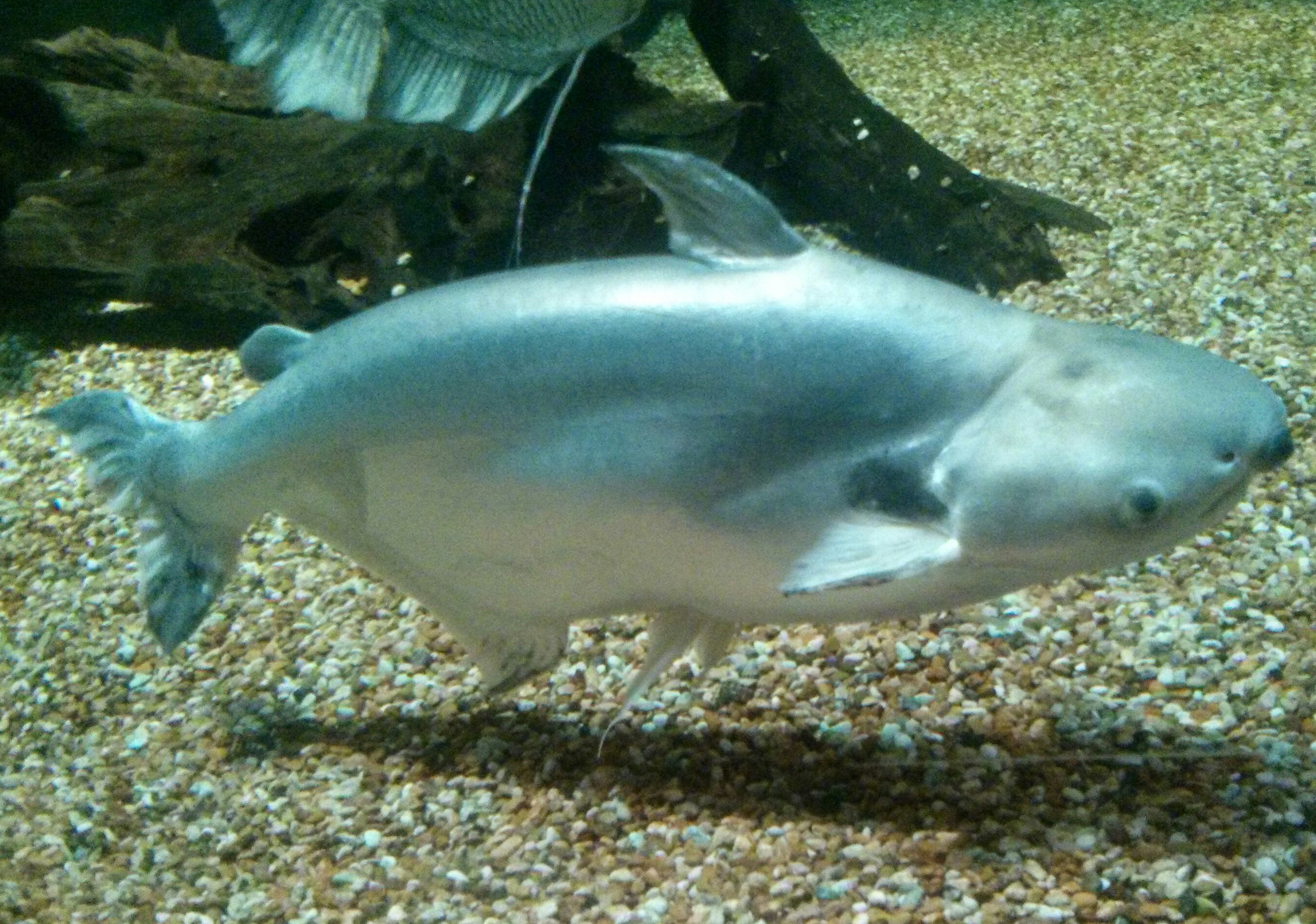
Pangasius larnaudii

Currently, 23 recognized species are in this genus:

- Pangasius bocourti Sauvage, 1880 (basa fish)
- Pangasius conchophilus Roberts & Vidthayanon, 1991 (snail eating pangasius)
- Pangasius djambal Bleeker, 1846
- Pangasius elongatus Pouyaud, Gustiano & Teugels, 2002 (elongated pangasius)
- Pangasius humeralis Roberts, 1989
- Pangasius icaria Ayyathurai, Kodeeswaran, Mohindra, Singh, Ravi, Kumar, Valaparambil, Thangappan, Jena & Lal, 2022
- Pangasius kinabatanganensis Roberts & Vidthayanon, 1991 (kinabatang pangasius)
- Pangasius krempfi Fang & Chaux, 1949
- Pangasius kunyit Pouyaud, Teugels & Legendre, 1999
- Pangasius larnaudii Bocourt, 1866 (spot pangasius)
- Pangasius lithostoma Roberts, 1989
- Pangasius macronema Bleeker, 1851
- Pangasius mahakamensis Pouyaud, Gustiano & Teugels, 2002
- Pangasius mekongensis Gustiano, Teugels & Pouyaud, 2003 (Mekong pangasius)
- Pangasius myanmar Roberts & Vidthayanon, 1991 (Myanmar pangasius)
- Pangasius nasutus (Bleeker, 1863) (long nosed pangasius)
- Pangasius nieuwenhuisii (Popta, 1904)
- Pangasius pangasius (Hamilton, 1822) (yellowtail catfish)
- Pangasius polyuranodon Bleeker, 1852
- Pangasius rheophilus Pouyaud & Teugels, 2000
- Pangasius sabahensis Gustiano, Teugels & Pouyaud, 2003
- Pangasius sanitwongsei Smith, 1931 (giant pangasius)
- Pangasius silasi Dwivedi, Gupta, Singh, Mohindra, Chandra, Easawarn, Jena & Lal, 2017

== Fossil record ==
The single known fossil species of this genus, P. indicus, is reported from the Paleogene period of Sipang, Sumatra, either from the Eocene or the Oligocene.
