= Pangasius silasi =

Conservation status
- Data Deficient (IUCN 3.1)

Scientific classification
- Kingdom: Animalia
- Phylum: Chordata
- Class: Actinopterygii
- Order: Siluriformes
- Family: Pangasiidae
- Genus: Pangasius
- Species: P. silasi

Binomial name
- Pangasius silasi Dwivedi et al., 2017

Species of fish

Pangasius silasi is a species of the Pangasiidae family, endemic to the Krishna River in India.

== Etymology ==
Pangasius Silasi was named in honor of Eric Godwin Silas (1928-2018), a Sri Lankan-born Indian ichthyologist and fisheries scientist

== Description ==
Pangasius silasi differs from Pangasius pangasius by having vomero-palatal teeth confluent as an uninterrupted curved band as opposed to two lunate vomeropalatal teeth patches on each side with a wide gap in the centre and 48 vertebrae as opposed to 44.

== Nutritional value ==
Pangasius silasi, like other species in the genus Pangasius, is known for its mild flavour, white flesh, and high nutritional content. It is a good source of protein, low in fat, and contains essential vitamins and minerals, making it a healthy option for consumers. The fish is particularly attractive in the market for its versatility in cooking, as it can be used in a variety of cuisines, from fried fillets to soups and curries.
