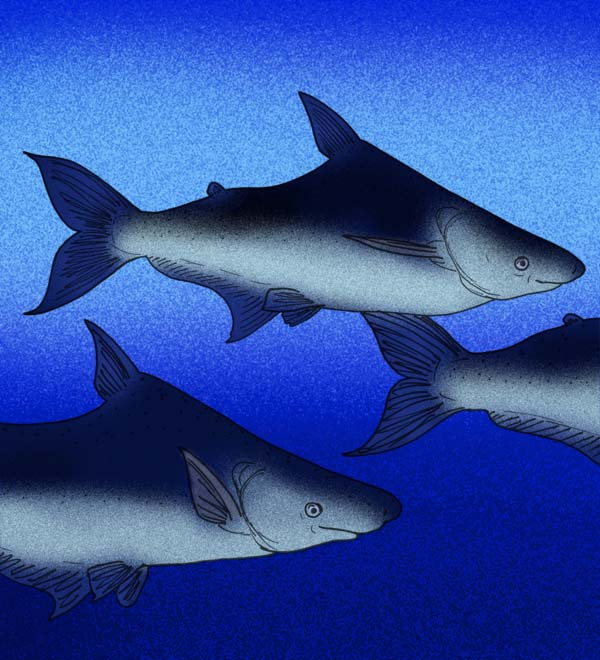
- Reconstruction

Scientific classification
- Kingdom: Animalia
- Phylum: Chordata
- Class: Actinopterygii
- Order: Siluriformes
- Family: Pangasiidae
- Genus: †Cetopangasius; Roberts & Jumnongthai, 1999
- Species: †C. chaetobranchus

Binomial name
- †Cetopangasius chaetobranchus Roberts & Jumnongthai, 1999

= Cetopangasius =

Cetopangasius chaetobranchus Temporal range: Middle or Late Miocene

Extinct genus of fishes

Cetopangasius chaetobranchus is an extinct species of shark catfish, family Pangasiidae. The fossils of this fish originated from a Miocene lake fauna from what is now the Phetchabun Province of Thailand.

== Discovery ==
The fossils of Cetopangasius chaetobranchus were discovered alongside a number of other fish fossils; during the dry season of 1997, the villagers of Ban Nong Pia were excavating an irrigation reservoir with an area of 40 by 120 metres (130 ft × 390 ft) and a uniform depth of 4 metres (13 ft). This effort inadvertently uncovered "thousands" of fossils, of fish, leaves from broad-leafed vascular plants, and reportedly remains of turtles and aquatic plants, some of which were sold to passers-by. The news of this discovery reached the press, and from May to June 1997, personnel from the Department of Mineral Resources and the National Center for Science Education visited the site for excavation. Further finds were not made as the reservoir filled in during the subsequent wet season of that year.

== Description ==
Cetopangasius chaetobranchus is distinguished from other pangasiids through a number of features, such as a very large head around a third of standard length (SL) (only matched by the Mekong giant catfish); stout, serrated fin-spines with the dorsal one larger than the pectoral pair, and extremely numerous and elongate gill rakers. A portion of the lower gill arch on a 30–40 cm (12–16 in) SL specimen showed more than 100 gill rakers present, and the total number of gill rakers on one gill arch is estimated to be 250–300. This is a much higher count than in living pangasiids, with the closest being that of the basa Pangasius bocourti, whose first gill arch bears up to 48 gill rakers. Specimens preserved tooth sockets on the mandible and maxilla, though the teeth themselves weren't preserved, and it is also thought that this species likely had palatal teeth as well. The meristic count of C. chaetobranchus is as follows: dorsal fin soft rays 7, pectoral fin soft rays 13, pelvic fin rays 5 or 6, anal fin rays 38–42, vertebrae count: 14-15 abdominal + 26-28 post-abdominal = 40-42 total.

The holotype of Cetopangasius, DMR TF 5013, has a SL of 335 mm (1.099 ft), while other near-complete specimens (the paratypes) ranged from 108 to 345 mm (0.354 to 1.132 ft) SL. The fragmentary NCSE specimen is thought to reach 48 to 52 cm (1.57 to 1.71 ft) SL.

Cetopangasius is thought to have lived not long after the divergence of Pangasiids and other groups of catfish, being an early diverging member of the family.

== Paleoecology ==
The sheer numbers of gill rakers found in Cetopangasius suggested that this species was a filter feeder, which is unlike any living Pangasiid.

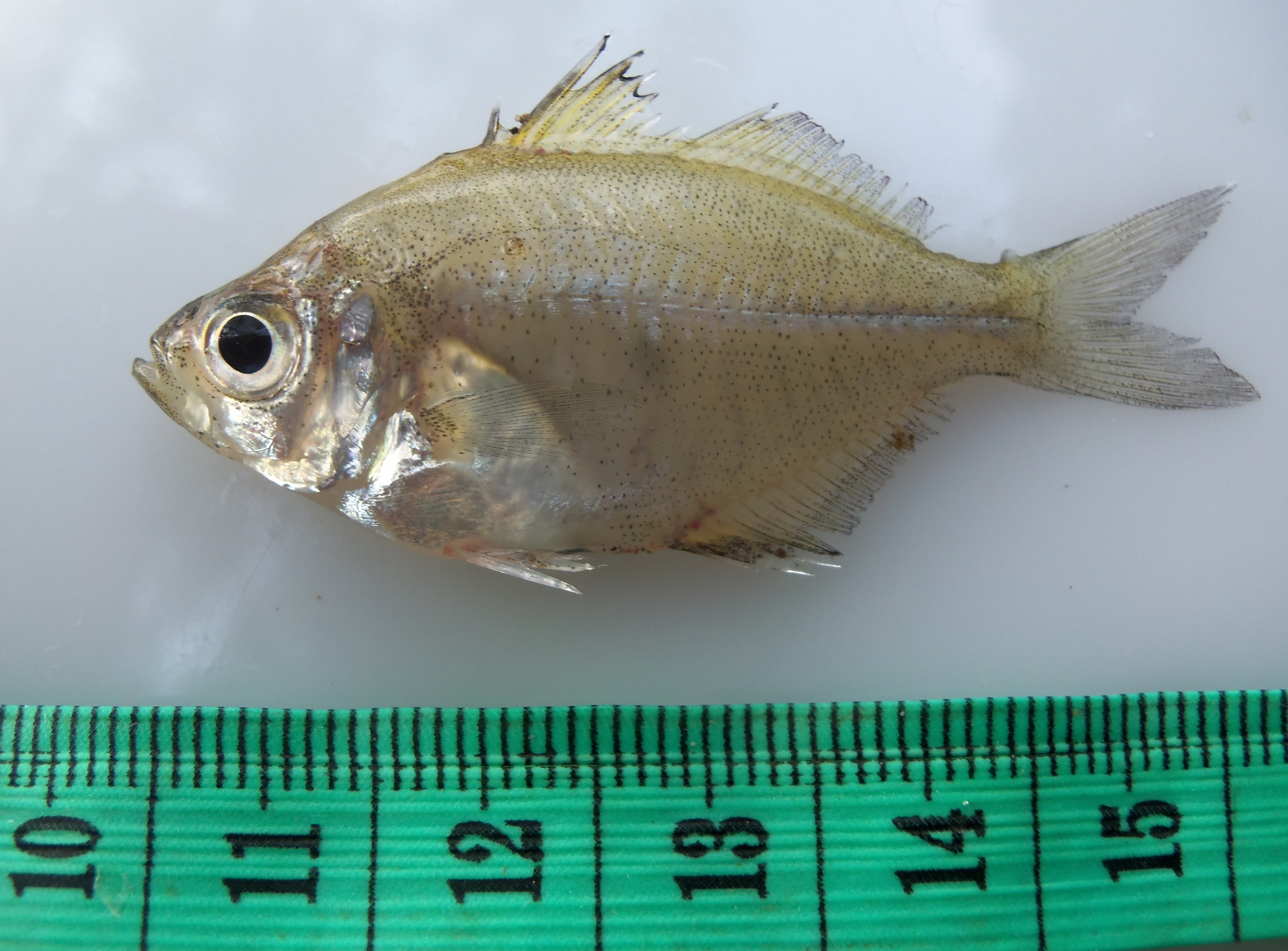
The extant Parambassis siamensis

The sediments that encouraged fossilization indicates that this environment was a lacustrine one, dubbed Lake Phetchabun, and it is possible that there was also a river and delta system flowing into the endorheic lake. It is thought that seasonal floods dumped an excess of sediment into the lake, lowering the water quality and causing fish kills. The waterways feeding this lake may have also been connected to a greater river system that flowed onto Sundaland, which is thought to have rivaled those of the modern Amazon and Congo basins in scale; Lake Phetchabun itself may have been an arm of a much more extensive lake system, supported by a more humid environment which is corroborated by the fossil plant matter. By the end of the Miocene, this system of lakes and large rivers was replaced by smaller waterways more similar to those of today such as Menam Pa Sak, which likely caused the extinction of the native fish through habitat loss.

The deposits that yielded the fossils of Cetopangasius preserved a variety of other fish species, being Cyprinids (Proluciosoma, Hypsibarbus, Bangana, 2 undeterminate forms), Ambassids (Parambassis goliath and P. paleosiamensis), and Bagrid catfish (Hemibagrus major, Leiocassis cf. siamensis).
