= Pangasius humeralis =

Scientific classification
- Kingdom: Animalia
- Phylum: Chordata
- Class: Actinopterygii
- Order: Siluriformes
- Family: Pangasiidae
- Genus: Pangasius
- Species: P. humeralis

Binomial name
- Pangasius humeralis Roberts, 1989

Species of fish

Pangasius humeralis is a species of fish in the family Pangasiidae. It is endemic to the Kapuas River basin of Borneo.
