= Kaeng thepho =

Thai curry dish

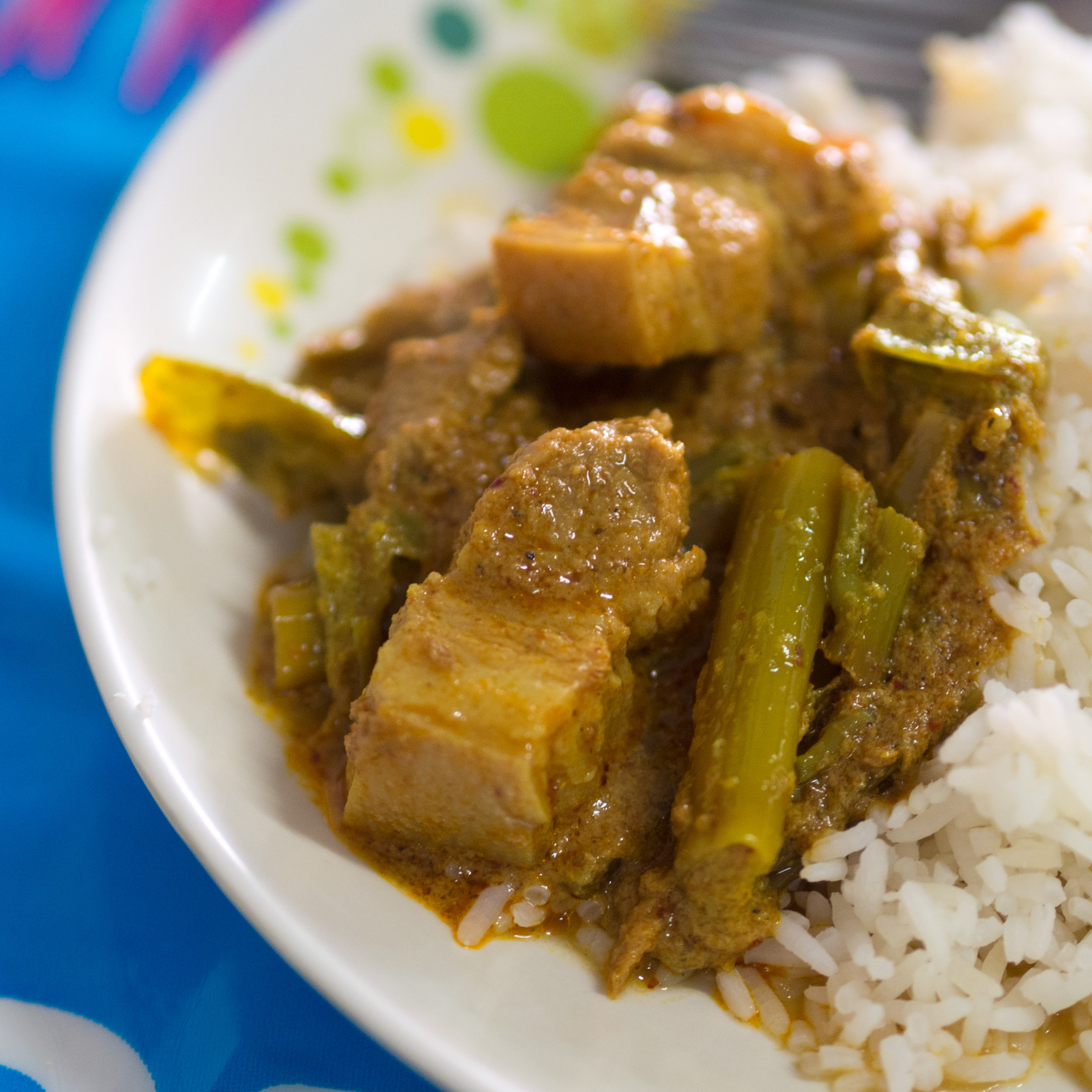
- Pork belly kaeng thepho
- Alternative names: Kaeng mu thepho
- Type: Curry
- Course: Lunch
- Place of origin: Central Thailand
- Region or state: Southeast Asia
- Associated cuisine: Thailand
- Serving temperature: Hot
- Main ingredients: Pork belly or Pangasius larnaudii meat, water spinach, curry paste, coconut milk, shrimp paste, tamarind pulp, fish sauce, palm sugar
- Other information: Usually served with steamed rice

Kaeng thepho (Thai: แกงเทโพ, pronounced [kɛ̄ːŋ tʰēː.pʰōː]) is a traditional Thai curry that dates back more than 200 years. It is mentioned in Kap He Chom Khrueang Khao Wan, a celebrated poetic work composed during the reign of King Rama II (early Rattanakosin period). In this poem, the dish is praised in vivid terms:

Thai	Transcription	English
เทโพพื้นเนื้อท้อง เป็นมันย่องล่องลอยมัน น่าซดรสครามครัน ของสวรรค์เสวยรมย์	Thepho phuen nuea thong Pen man yong long-loi man Na sot rot kram-kran Khong sawan sawoeuy rom	Thepho's tender belly meat Rich with glistening fat A broth of boundless savor A heavenly delight to taste

Kaeng thepho is classified as a traditional central Thai curry. Its original name derives from the freshwater shark catfish known as thepho (Pangasius larnaudii), which was once the primary ingredient used in preparing the dish. Consequently, the curry itself took its name directly from this fish.

Over time, however, cultural changes and shifts in trade made thepho increasingly scarce. As a result, the recipe gradually evolved to employ pork belly instead. The rich fat content of pork belly complements the curry paste and blends harmoniously with the creaminess of coconut milk, producing a flavor and texture well suited to the dish. Today, Kaeng thepho is most commonly prepared with pork belly rather than fish, marking a departure from its original form.

The curry is characterized by a balanced combination of sour, sweet, and salty flavors. The sourness derives from tamarind pulp, distinguishing it from other Thai curries that typically rely on key lime or kaffir lime for acidity. Water spinach (Ipomoea aquatica) is the principal vegetable used, adding a crisp texture and a subtle natural sweetness when eaten.

== History ==
=== Origin of the dish ===
Kaeng Thepo is believed to have originated in central Thailand during the early Rattanakosin period. The dish was originally made with pla thepo (Pangasius larnaudii), a freshwater fish that was once common in Thai rivers. Over time, this fish became less available, and pork belly was adopted as a substitute in many recipes, though the name of the dish was retained.

The earliest references to Kaeng Thepo appear in 19th- and early 20th-century Thai cookbooks, including Patanu Krom Kan Tham Khong Khao Khong Wan (1898) ปะทานุกรม การทำของคาวหวานอย่างฝรั่งแลสยาม and Mae Khrua Hua Pa (1908–1909). These works described the dish as a variety of red curry that included fish, water spinach, tamarind, and kaffir lime leaves as key ingredients. The dish was also noted in traditional literature such as royal poems, which praised its rich and savory flavor, suggesting that Kaeng Thepo had an established place in both household and ceremonial cooking during that era.

=== Development ===
Over time, Kaeng Thepo was gradually adapted from its original fish-based recipe to include pork belly as a more widely available substitute. Coconut milk was later incorporated, giving the curry a creamier texture and balancing the spiciness of the red curry paste. In the early 20th century, printed cookbooks such as Mae Khrua Hua Pa (1908–1909) provided variations of the recipe, showing how the dish was refined for both household and ceremonial cooking.

During the mid-20th century, the dish became more commonly associated with central Thai home cooking rather than temple or royal cuisine. Alternative versions, including those with vegetarian substitutions and regional adaptations, also emerged to meet modern dietary preferences. These developments helped establish Kaeng Thepo as a recognized staple in Thai culinary tradition.

=== Spread within Thailand ===
After becoming established as one of the traditional coconut milk based curries of the Central Thailand region, Kaeng thepho gradually spread into household cooking and was incorporated into the menus of everyday eateries in Bangkok and other major urban centers.

Food writers have noted that its classification within the group of sour coconut curries distinguishes it from typical Thai red curries and provides diners with a distinctive balance of sourness, sweetness, and saltiness.

Kaeng thepho, though less popular than Green curry or Red curry, continues to appear in some traditional and family-style restaurants in Bangkok and other major cities, but is rarely found outside Central Thailand due to its specific ingredients and the cooking skills required.

=== Modern era ===
In modern times, Kaeng thepho has adapted to contemporary lifestyles, with pork belly often replacing the original fish, and commercial curry paste commonly used for convenience. Health-conscious variations reduce fat content, while restaurants emphasize lighter flavors and modern presentation. Despite these changes, it remains a three-flavor coconut curry balancing sourness, sweetness, and saltiness.

== Etymology and origins ==
The term Kaeng Thepo (แกงเทโพ) literally means “Thepo curry.” The word kaeng (แกง) refers to a Thai-style curry or soup, while thepo (เทโพ) is believed to come from pla thepho (ปลาเทโพ), a freshwater catfish (Pangasius larnaudii) commonly found in the Chao Phraya River basin. Early versions of the dish were cooked with this fish, which explains the origin of its name. As the fish became rare, pork belly was substituted, but the traditional name remained in use.

Some accounts suggest that the name Thepo may also have a religious or symbolic origin. Certain scholars argue that Thepo refers to Phra Thep Po (พระเทโพ), a guardian deity or celestial figure in Buddhist and Hindu belief, representing virtue and prosperity. Others claim that the dish may have been first offered as temple food (อาหารวัด), and the association with “Thepo” symbolized merit-making and offerings to monks. Despite these debates, most culinary historians agree that the name most likely originated from the fish species rather than a religious figure.

== Ingredients and preparation ==
=== Basic components ===
Kaeng thepho is built on a base of coconut milk enriched with a red curry paste and a souring agent derived from tamarind. The most common protein in modern versions is pork belly, whose fat renders into the sauce, while some recipes use leaner pork cuts or, more rarely, fish or tofu. Vegetables are led by water spinach, added for its crisp texture, with aromatic notes from Kaffir lime leaves. Seasoning typically balances fish sauce and palm sugar to produce the dish’s characteristic three-flavor profile.

=== Preparation method ===
The curry is usually prepared by frying the red curry paste in coconut cream until fragrant, then adding pork belly before diluting with coconut milk. Tamarind, fish sauce, and palm sugar are added to balance the flavors, with water spinach and kaffir lime leaves stirred in just before serving.

=== Common condiments ===
Kaeng thepho is eaten with steamed jasmine rice. At the table, seasoning may be adjusted with condiments such as prik nam pla (Bird's eye chili in fish sauce), chili flakes, or chili vinegar, depending on household or restaurant practice.

== Styles/Variations of Kaeng Thepo ==
=== Regional variations ===
While Kaeng Thepo is most strongly associated with Central Thailand, regional adaptations reflect local ingredients and preferences. In some areas of the Central Plains, cooks incorporate freshwater fish instead of pork belly, continuing the dish’s historical connection to the thepho fish (Pangasius larnaudii).

In contrast, versions from the lower North and upper Central regions may feature less coconut milk, resulting in a lighter and spicier broth that complements local palates. Southern variations occasionally add shrimp paste or additional herbs, producing a more pungent flavor profile reminiscent of other regional curries.

=== Other kaeng thepho dishes ===
Other notable variation of Kaeng Thepo is Kaeng Thepo Jae, which replaces pork with tofu or mushrooms while maintaining the red curry base and tamarind flavored coconut broth.

This version is often prepared during the Nine Emperor Gods Festival., reflecting Buddhist dietary principles and the tradition of merit-making.

=== Kaeng Thepo outside Thailand ===
Beyond Thailand, Kaeng Thepo appears in Thai restaurants abroad as part of menus highlighting traditional curries. Its relatively mild heat and balanced flavor make it accessible to international diners while still preserving its distinct character.

Adaptations outside Thailand may substitute local greens for water spinach or reduce the coconut milk for a lighter consistency.

== Cultural significance ==
=== Festivals and ritual meals ===
Kaeng Thepho is commonly prepared and offered at temple ceremonies, where it is shared among monks and laypeople as part of merit-making rituals. It appears in traditional Thai cuisine collections describing foods for communal feasts, symbolizing balance and abundance

During local festivals in Central Thailand, it is offered alongside other Thai curries such as Kaeng som and Kaeng phet, representing a connection between religious devotion and everyday nourishment.

=== Representation in media and literature ===
Kaeng Thepho appears in early Thai literature, notably in Kap He Chom Khrueang Khao Wan, a royal poem composed during the reign of King Rama II. In this poem, the curry is celebrated for its rich flavor and glistening fat, evoking imagery of luxury and heavenly delight.

In modern times, Kaeng Thepho is referenced in culinary media and cookbooks that highlight traditional Thai cuisine, where it is associated with home-style cooking and is preserved as part of the country’s intangible cultural heritage.
