= Pangasius myanmar =

Conservation status
- Data Deficient (IUCN 3.1)

Scientific classification
- Kingdom: Animalia
- Phylum: Chordata
- Class: Actinopterygii
- Order: Siluriformes
- Family: Pangasiidae
- Genus: Pangasius
- Species: P. myanmar

Binomial name
- Pangasius myanmar Roberts & Vidthayanon, 1991

Species of fish

Pangasius myanmar is a species of shark catfish. It is a freshwater, benthopelagic, tropical fish, measuring up to 120 centimetres (3.9 ft) long. It is found from the Irrawaddy River to Salween and in Rangoon.
