= Pangasius kinabatanganensis =

Conservation status
- Data Deficient (IUCN 3.1)

Scientific classification
- Kingdom: Animalia
- Phylum: Chordata
- Class: Actinopterygii
- Order: Siluriformes
- Family: Pangasiidae
- Genus: Pangasius
- Species: P. kinabatanganensis

Binomial name
- Pangasius kinabatanganensis Roberts & Vidthayanon, 1991

Species of fish

Pangasius kinabatanganensis is a species of shark catfish. It is a freshwater, benthopelagic and tropical fish, measuring up to 23.8 centimetres (9 in) long. It is found in the Kinabatangan basin, in northeastern Borneo which is in the state of Sabah, Malaysia.
