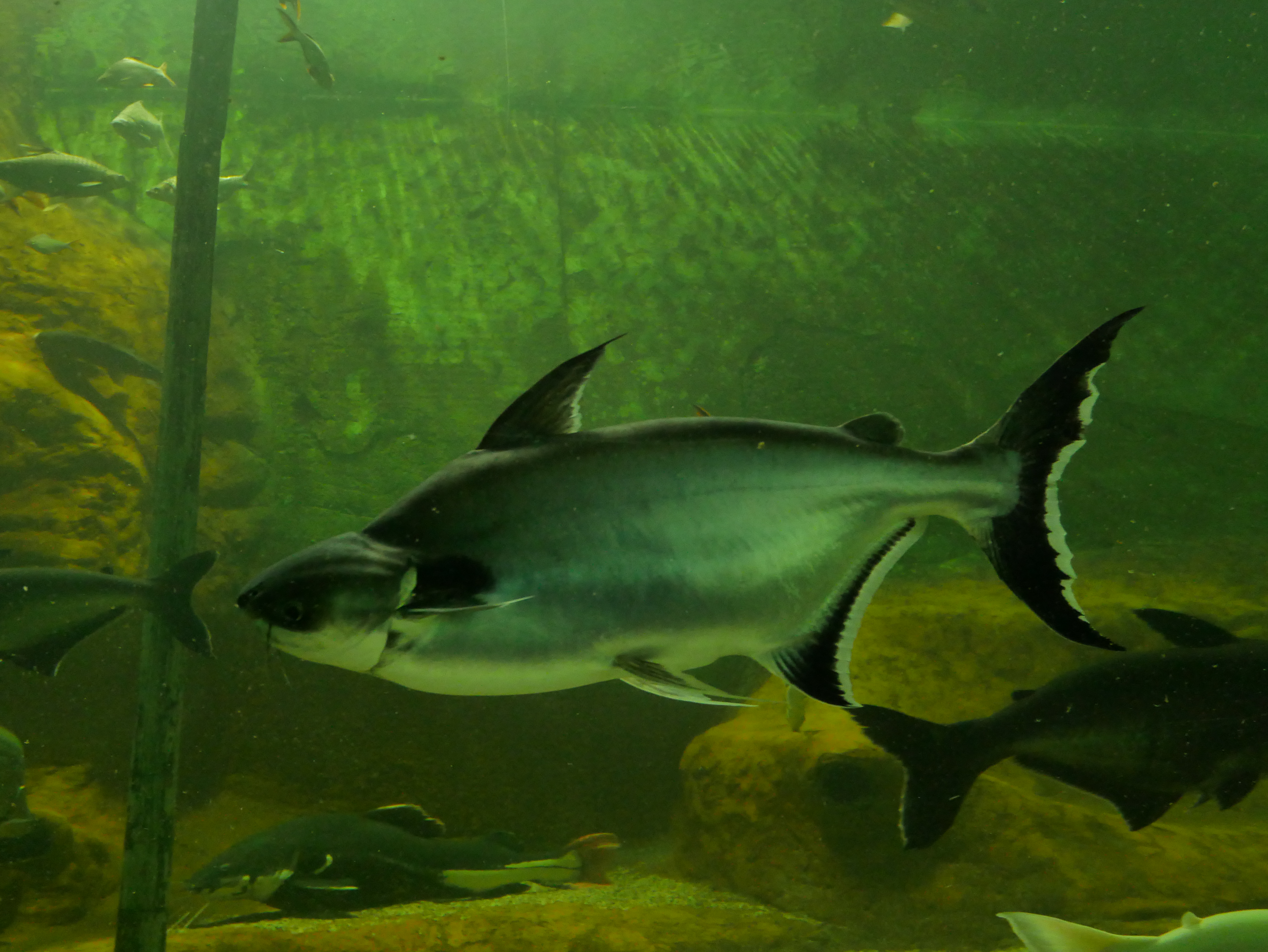
- Pangasius larnaudii in Chiang Mai Zoo Aquarium, Chiang Mai Zoo, Thailand

Conservation status
- Least Concern (IUCN 3.1).

Scientific classification
- Kingdom: Animalia
- Phylum: Chordata
- Class: Actinopterygii
- Order: Siluriformes
- Family: Pangasiidae
- Genus: Pangasius
- Species: P. larnaudii

Binomial name
- Pangasius larnaudii Bocourt, 1866

= Pangasius larnaudii =

Species of catfish

Pangasius larnaudii, the black ear catfish, or the spot pangasius is a species of freshwater shark catfish endemic to Mekong and Chao Phraya basins.

The fish can grow up to 130 cm (4.3 ft) in length and weigh around 46 kg (101.4 lb). It resembles the giant pangasius (P. sanitwongsei) in the same genus, but differs in having shorter, less pointed fins, a rounder belly, and a distinct large black spot located just behind the pectoral fin.

In Thailand, it is known as thepho (Thai: เทโพ, pronounced [tʰēː.pʰōː]) or hu-mat (หูหมาด, pronounced [hǔː.màːt̚], lit. 'black ear'), the latter name referring to the black spot. It is commonly found in association with schools of iridescent shark (Pangasianodon hypophthalmus).

Its flesh is considered highly palatable, with the abdominal portion being especially valued for its richness in fat. Historically, it served as the principal ingredient in Kaeng thepho (แกงเทโพ), a traditional Thai curry prepared with fish and water spinach. The dish derives its name directly from the fish. Due to the species' rarity and elevated market value however, pork belly is frequently substituted for the original fish in the contemporary preparation of this curry.
