= Pangasius conchophilus =

Conservation status
- Least Concern (IUCN 3.1)

Scientific classification
- Domain: Eukaryota
- Kingdom: Animalia
- Phylum: Chordata
- Class: Actinopterygii
- Order: Siluriformes
- Family: Pangasiidae
- Genus: Pangasius
- Species: P. conchophilus

Binomial name
- Pangasius conchophilus Roberts & Vidthayanon, 1991

Species of fish

Pangasius conchophilus (snail eating pangasius) is a species of shark catfish. It is a freshwater, benthopelagic, potamodromous and tropical fish, measuring up to 120 centimetres (3.9 ft) long. It is found in the Mekong, Bangpakong, and Chao Phraya basins.

== Description ==
This species counts with 25 to 30 anal soft rays. Its dorsum is a dull grey colour with a pale green iridescence. Its maxillary band of teeth forms a continuous row, and its snout protrudes with upper jaw tooth bands which are somewhat exposed when the animal's mouth is closed; it possesses a large median vomerine tooth plate.

The fish habitates large rivers and enters flooded forests. It is also found in rapids and in deep slow reaches. Juveniles are found to feed on prawns and insects, while adults on prawns, insects, mollusks, and on plants. The species migrates into the middle Mekong along the Thai-Lao border as water turbidity increases. It is known to reproduce early in the flood season, and juveniles of between 6 and 7 centimetres (2.4 and 2.8 in) are taken by the end of the month of June. It is a local edible specimen.
