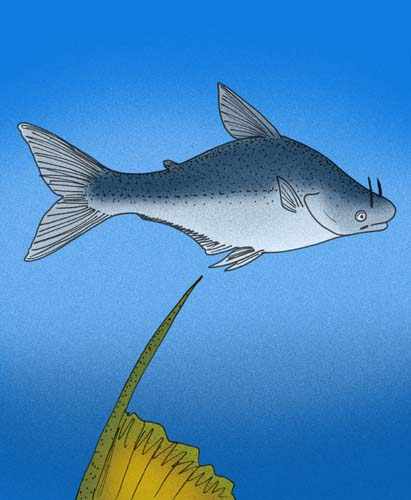
- Artist's reconstruction

Scientific classification
- Kingdom: Animalia
- Phylum: Chordata
- Class: Actinopterygii
- Order: Siluriformes
- Family: Pangasiidae
- Genus: Pangasius; Valenciennes, 1840
- Species: P. indicus

Binomial name
- Pangasius indicus Marck, 1876

= Pangasius indicus =

Pangasius indicus Temporal range: ?Paleogene

Extinct species of fish

Pangasius indicus is an extinct species of catfish of the family Pangasiidae. This fish was a member of the "Sipang Fauna", a lagerstatte from Sipang, Sumatra, of indeterminate age, possibly either Eocene, Oligocene, or even Miocene in age.
