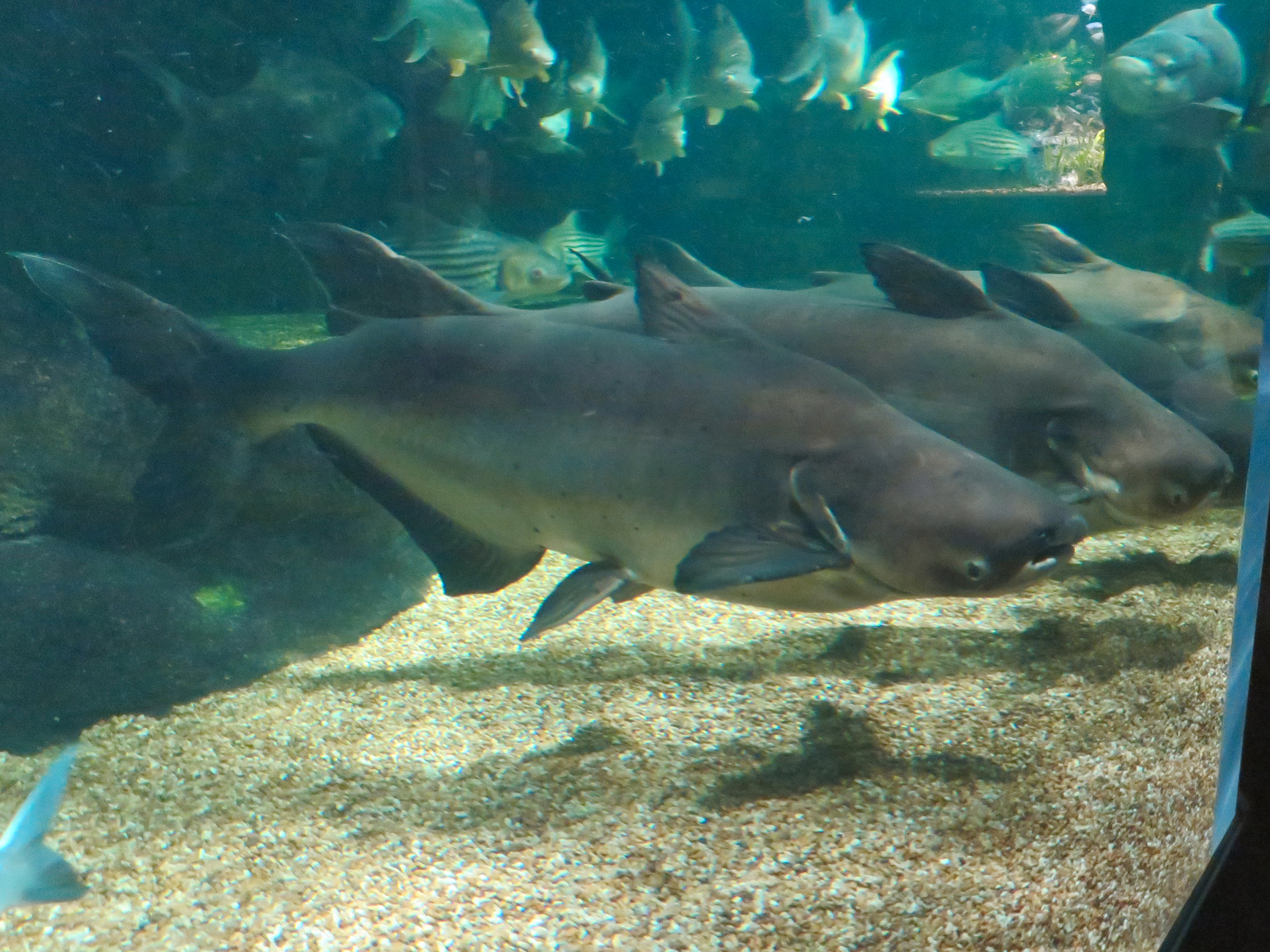
- At the Gifu World Freshwater Aquarium

Conservation status
- Critically Endangered (IUCN 3.1)
- CITES Appendix I

Scientific classification
- Kingdom: Animalia
- Phylum: Chordata
- Class: Actinopterygii
- Division: Teleostei
- Order: Siluriformes
- Family: Pangasiidae
- Genus: Pangasianodon
- Species: P. gigas

Binomial name
- Pangasianodon gigas Chevey, 1931

Synonyms
- Pangasius gigas (Chevey, 1931); Pangasius paucidens Fang & Chaux, 1949

= Mekong giant catfish =

Species of large catfish

The Mekong giant catfish (Pangasianodon gigas; Thai: ปลาบึก, RTGS: pla buek, pronounced [plāː bɯ̀k]; Khmer: ត្រីរាជ /trəy riec/; Vietnamese: cá tra dầu) is a large species of catfish (order Siluriformes) in the shark catfish family (Pangasiidae), native to the Mekong basin in Southeast Asia and adjacent China. It is considered critically endangered due to overfishing and habitat loss.

== Description ==
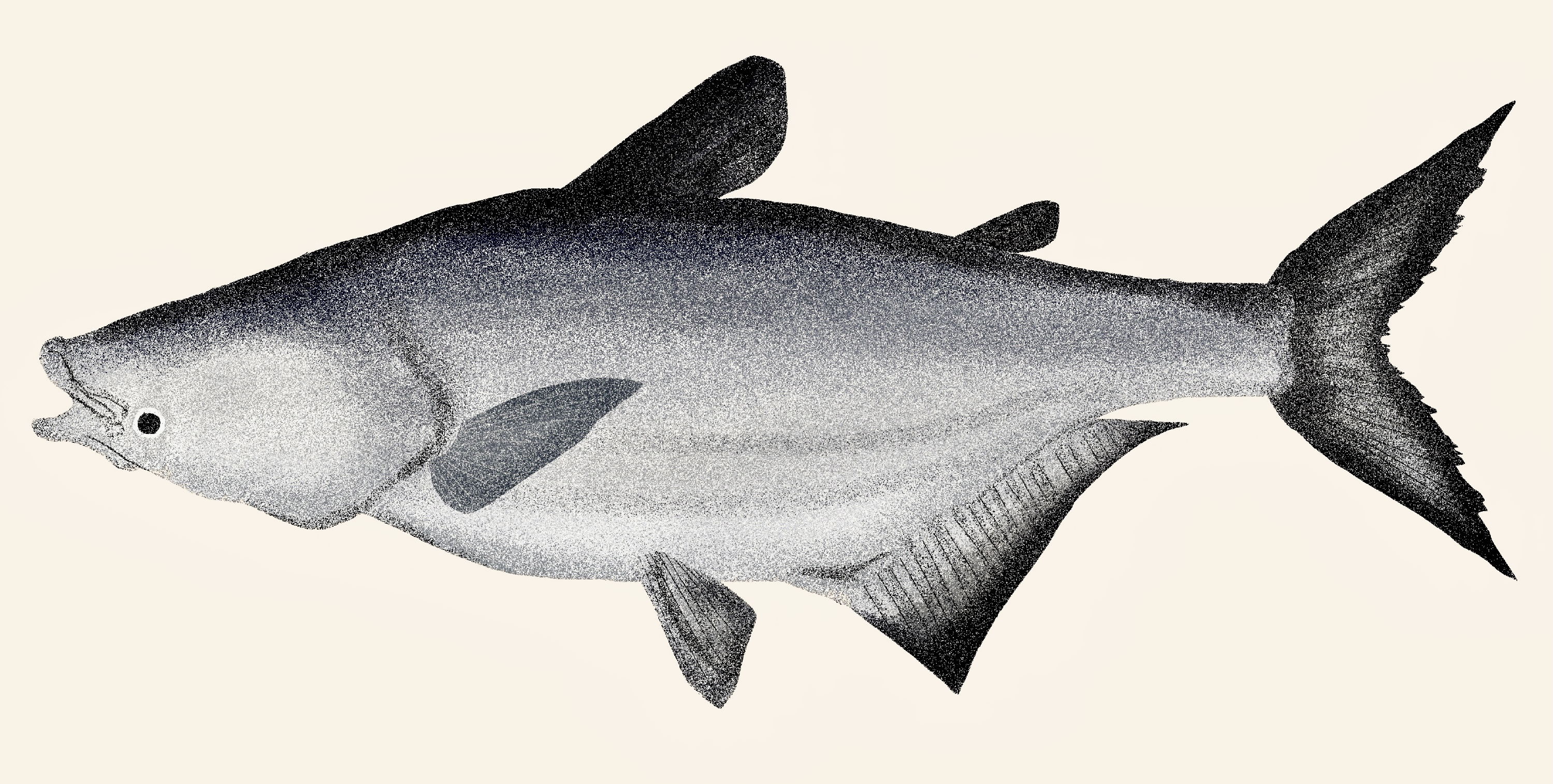
Depiction of a mature Mekong giant catfish from the Illustrated collection of fishes from Asia, Africa and Australia

Grey to white in color and lacking stripes, the Mekong giant catfish is distinguished from other large catfish species in the river by the near-total lack of barbels and the absence of teeth. Young Mekong catfish do exhibit barbels and oral teeth, but these features diminish as they age and are absent by the time they grow to be 30–50 cm in length.

Mekong giant catfish are one of the largest species of freshwater fish. In 2005, the Mekong giant catfish attained the Guinness World Record for the world's largest freshwater fish. Attaining a length of up to 3 m (9.8 ft), the giant catfish grows extremely quickly, reaching a mass of 150 to 200 kg (330 to 440 lb) in only six years. It can reportedly weigh up to 350 kg (770 lb). The largest catch recorded in Thailand since record-keeping began in 1981 was a female measuring 2.7 m (8 ft 10 in) in length and weighing 293 kg (646 lb). This specimen, caught in 2005, was widely recognized as the largest entirely freshwater fish ever caught (the largest sturgeon species, the beluga, can far exceed this size, but they are anadromous), until surpassed in June of 2022 by a giant freshwater stingray specimen caught in Cambodia. Thai fisheries officials stripped the giant catfish, caught in 2005, of its eggs as part of a breeding program, intending then to release it, but the fish died in captivity and was sold as food to local villagers.

== Distribution and habitat ==
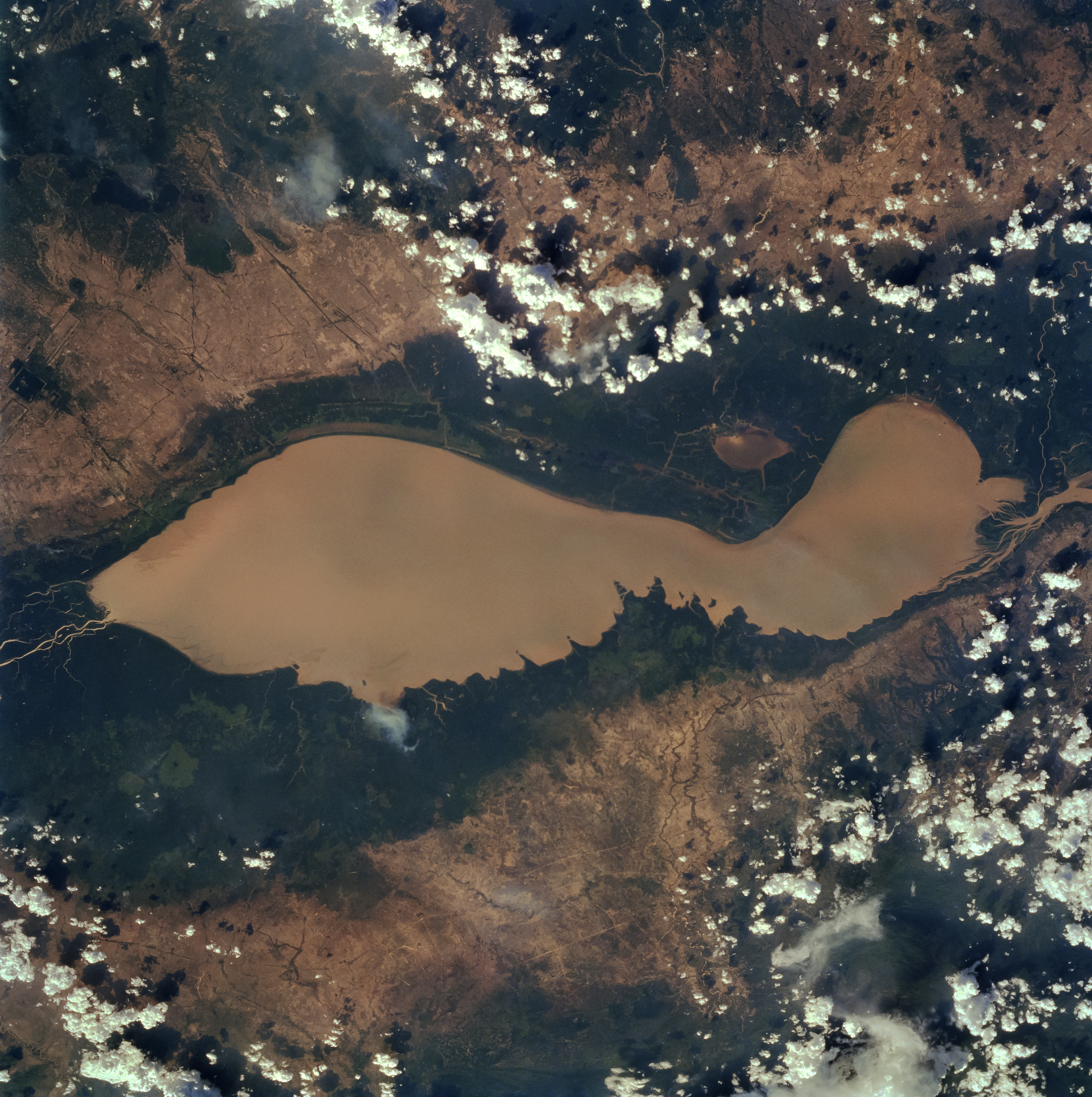
Tonlé Sap lake

The Mekong giant catfish is a threatened species in the Mekong, and conservationists have focused on it as a flagship species to promote conservation on the river. Although research projects are currently ongoing, relatively little is known about this species. Historically, the fish's natural range reached from the lower Mekong in Vietnam (above the tidally influenced brackish water of the river's delta) all the way to the northern reaches of the river in the Yunnan Province of China, spanning almost the entire 4,800 km (3,000 mi) length of the river. Due to threats, this species no longer inhabits the majority of its original habitat. It is now believed to only exist in small, isolated populations in the middle Mekong region. Fish congregate during the beginning of the rainy season and migrate upstream to spawn. They live primarily in the main channel of the river, where the water depth is over 10 m (33 ft), while researchers, fishermen and officials have found this species in the Tonlé Sap River and Lake in Cambodia, a UNESCO Biosphere Reserve. In the past, fishers have reported the fish in a number of the Mekong's tributaries. In December of 2024, 6 of the Mekong giant catfish were sighted and caught along the Tonle Sap River, in Cambodia. However, In 2005 the biggest Mekong giant catfish to be caught was in northern Thailand and weighed up to 292 kg.

== Ecology ==
As fry, this species feeds on zooplankton in the river and is known to be cannibalistic. After about one year, the fish becomes herbivorous, feeding on filamentous algae, probably ingesting larvae and periphyton accidentally. The fish likely obtains its food from algae growing on submerged rocky surfaces, as it does not have any sort of dentition. The Mekong giant catfish are toothless herbivores that live off of the plants and algae in the river. One scientific study found zooplankton and phytoplankton in their stomach contents.

Understanding of the species' migration pattern is incomplete. The fish are thought to rear primarily in the Mekong and Cambodia's Tonlé Sap lake and migrate hundreds of miles north to spawning grounds in Thailand. Spawning fish in the upper Cambodia are being over-harvested. Fragmentation caused by infrastructure development of dams are becoming increasingly common posing threats to larval fish and reducing breeding abilities. Overfishing, damming, destruction of spawning and breeding grounds and siltation have taken a toll on the species' habitat.

== Relation to humans ==
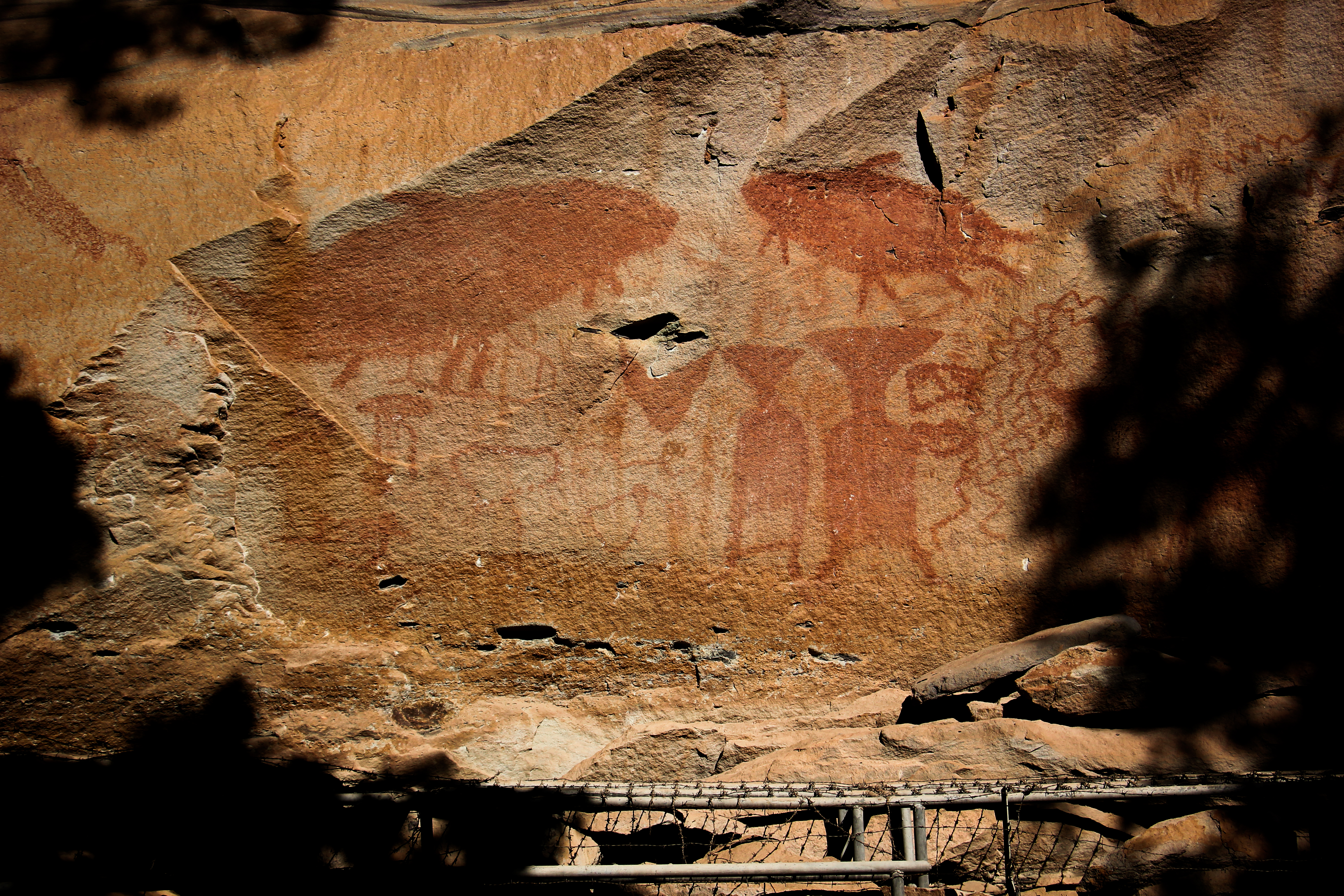
Prehistoric rock art depicting several Mekong giant catfish, at Pha Taem National Park in Thailand

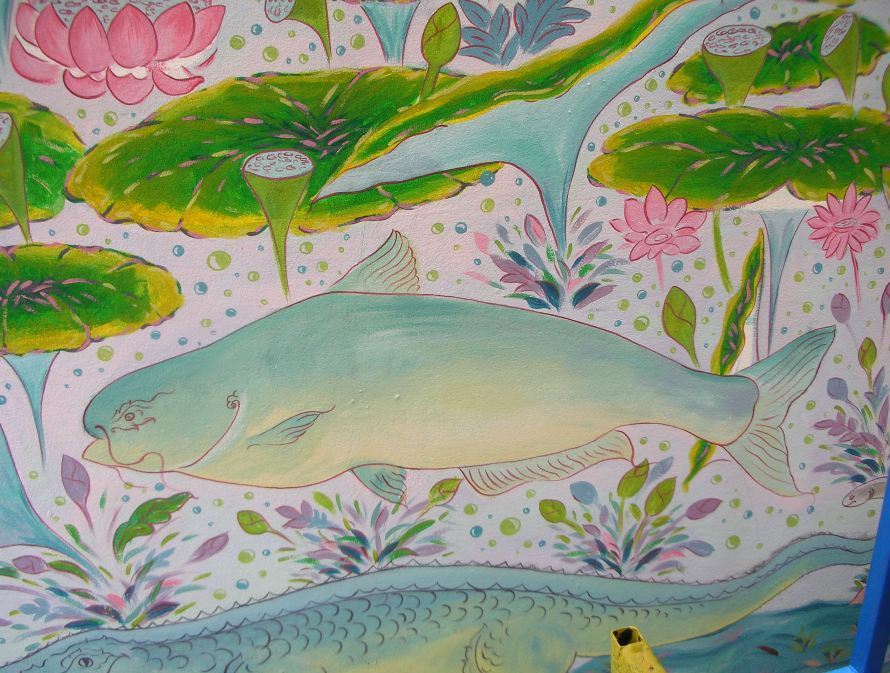
Illustration of a Mekong giant catfish at a Buddhist temple in Chiang Khong.

In Thai folklore, this fish is regarded with reverence, and special rituals are followed and offerings are made before fishing it. The species is represented as ancient art along the Mekong River.

In The Anthropologists' Cookbook (1977), Jessica Kuper noted the importance of the pa beuk to the Lao people and remarked, "In times gone by, this huge fish, which is found only in the Mekong, was fairly plentiful, but in the last few years, the number taken annually has dwindled to forty, thirty or twenty, and perhaps in 1976 even fewer. This is sad, as it is a noble fish and a mysterious one, revered by the Lao." In 2000, fishermen hauled out 11 giant catfish. In 2001 they caught seven. In 2002 they caught just five.

Mekong giant catfish along with the giant barb, giant pangasius, redtail catfish and alligator gar are a common sport fish in exotic fishing ponds in Thailand, Malaysia, and Vietnam. This is because of their giant size and because they often put up a strong fight after getting hooked.

=== Conservation ===
Endemic to the lower half of the Mekong River, this catfish is in danger of extinction due to overfishing, as well as the decrease in water quality due to development and upstream damming. A 2018 study suggests that the Mekong stocks could fall up to 40% as the result of dam projects. The current IUCN Red List for fishes classes the species as critically endangered; the number living in the wild is unknown, but catch data indicate the population has fallen by 80% in the last 14 years. It is also listed in Appendix I of CITES, banning commercial international trade involving wild-caught specimens.

Fishing for the Mekong giant catfish is illegal in the wild in Thailand, Laos, and Cambodia, but the bans appear to be ineffective and the fish continue to be caught in all three countries. In recognition of the threat to the species, though, nearly 60 Thai fishermen agreed to stop catching the endangered catfish in June 2006, to mark the 60th anniversary of Bhumibol Adulyadej's ascension to the throne of Thailand. Thailand is the only country to allow fishing for private stocks of Mekong giant catfish. This helps save the species, as lakes purchase the small fry from the government breeding programme, generating extra income that allows the breeding program to function. Fishing lakes, such as Bueng Samran (บึงสำราญ) in Bangkok, have the species up to 140 kg (310 lb). The most common size landed is 18 kg (40 lb), although some companies specialise in landing the larger fish.

The species needs to reach 50–70 kg (110–150 lb) to breed, and it does not breed in lakes. The Thailand Fisheries Department has instituted a breeding programme to restock the Mekong River. From 2000 to 2003, about 10,000 captive-bred specimens were released by the Thai authorities. Specimens are released into reservoirs rather than the Mekong River itself.

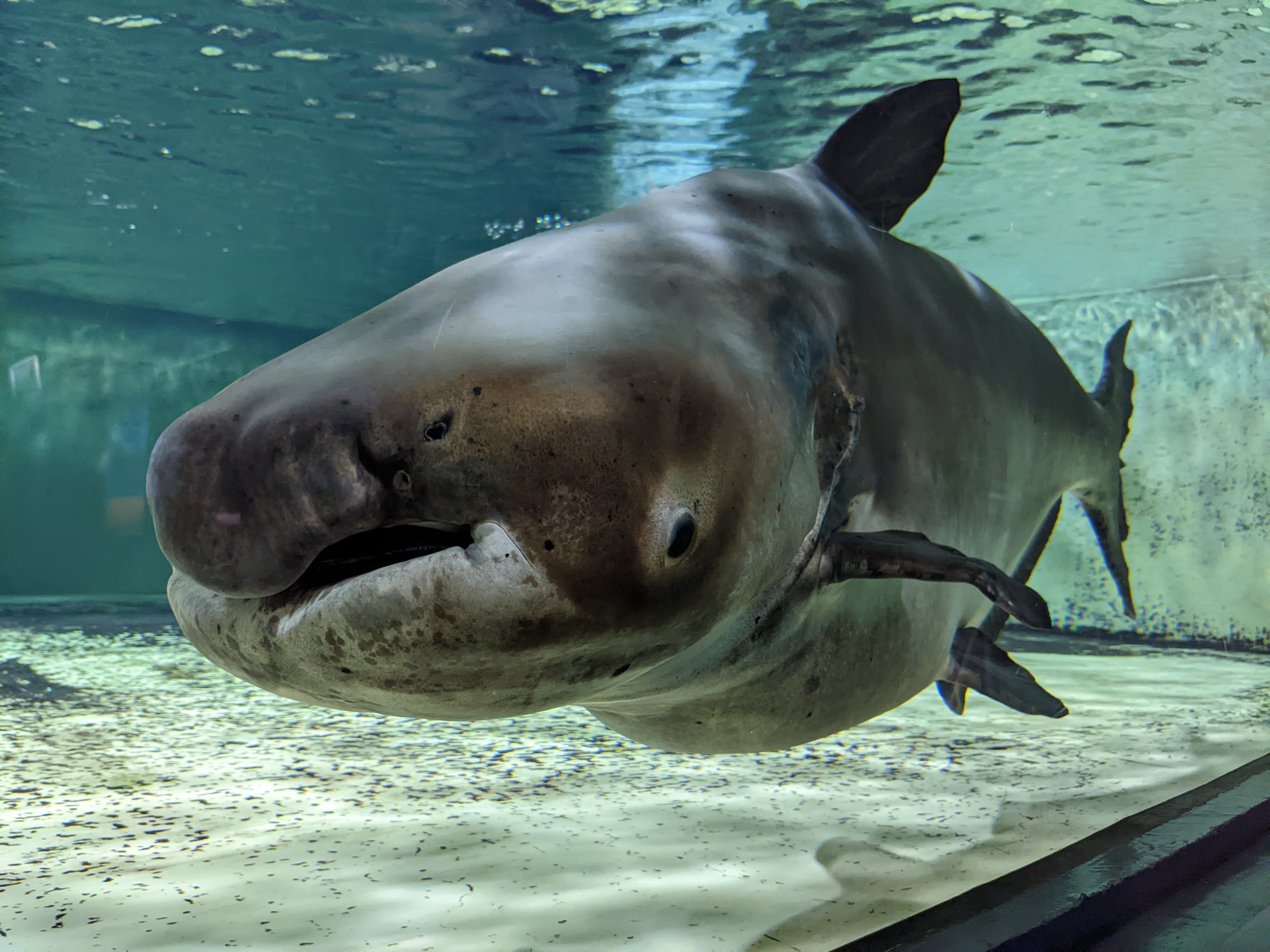
Closeup of a specimen at Nagasaki Penguin Aquarium, gifted to Japan by Thailand

The Mekong giant catfish is described as a contemporary example of overharvest. Millions of tons of fish are harvested in Cambodia every year, with spawning fish being overharvested. Fragmentation caused by dams increasingly poses threats to larval fish. Trends in water use, energy production, consumption, and associated environmental degradation are projected to continue rising in Southeast Asia. Mekong giant catfish are highly migratory, requiring large stretches of river for seasonal journeys and specific environmental conditions in their spawning and breeding areas.

The World Wide Fund for Nature works in partnership with other organizations including the Mekong River Commission and the Asian Development Bank which aims to ensure that environmental and social impacts are considered in developments of hydropower infrastructures. It also implements projects dedicated to conservation, research, monitoring, and raising awareness of the Mekong giant catfish.

=== In captivity ===
Mekong giant catfish are now successfully bred in Thailand, some of them bred for the aquarium trade. Ownership and importation of the fish has been restricted in various states of Australia due to fears it could become an invasive species.

They are often hybridised with the iridescent shark to make the Mekong iridescent shark. A short body morph has been developed, similar to those of the paroon shark and iridescent shark.
