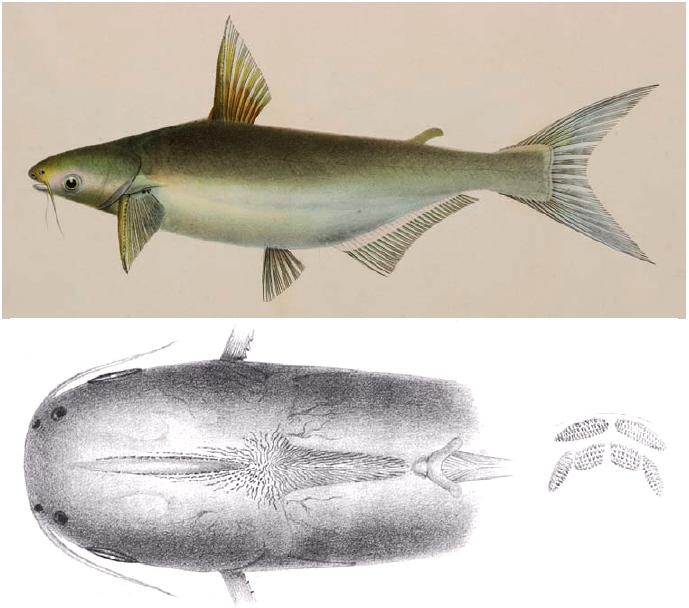

Conservation status
- Least Concern (IUCN 3.1)

Scientific classification
- Kingdom: Animalia
- Phylum: Chordata
- Class: Actinopterygii
- Order: Siluriformes
- Family: Pangasiidae
- Genus: Pangasius
- Species: P. djambal

Binomial name
- Pangasius djambal Bleeker, 1846

Synonyms
- Pangasius bedado (Roberts, 1999)

= Pangasius djambal =

Species of freshwater fish

Pangasius djambal is a species of freshwater fish in the family Pangasiidae, commonly found in Southeast Asia.

== Etymology ==
The generic name Pangasius and the specific epithet djambal both refer to the name of the fish in the local languages of South East Asia; Assamese, and Malayan/Sundanese respectively.

== Description ==
Pangasius djambal was first described by the Dutch naturalist Pieter Bleeker in 1846, it is native to the Mekong basin, Malaysia and Indonesia. It has an elongated body, typically silver-gray in color with a pale underside. It can grow up to around 90 centimetres (35 in) in length and 16 Kilograms in weight and has a large head with long barbels on each side of the upper jaw, aiding its bottom-feeding habits. This species is omnivorous, feeding on small invertebrates(insect larvae, worms and insects), detritus, and plant matter, and prefers slow-moving, turbid waters with muddy or sandy substrates. Pangasius djambal plays an ecological role in local ecosystems but faces potential threats from habitat degradation and overfishing.

== Fisheries ==
The species is fished commercially, especially in Indonesia, and is considered a promising candidate for use in aquaculture due to its rapid growth and high protein content.
