= Pangasius krempfi =

Conservation status
- Vulnerable (IUCN 3.1)

Scientific classification
- Kingdom: Animalia
- Phylum: Chordata
- Class: Actinopterygii
- Order: Siluriformes
- Family: Pangasiidae
- Genus: Pangasius
- Species: P. krempfi

Binomial name
- Pangasius krempfi Fang and Chaux, 1949

Synonyms
- Sinopangasius semicultratus Chang & Wu, 1965

Species of fish

Pangasius krempfi is a species of freshwater fish in the family Pangasiidae, which is commonly known as the pangas. This species is native to the Mekong river of Southeast Asia.

== Description ==
Pangasius krempfi was first described by Fang and Chaux in 1949. It is a medium to large-sized fish characterized by its streamlined body typical of the genus Pangasius.

The species has 1 dorsal spine, 6-7 dorsal soft rays, 4 anal spines, and 31-34 anal soft rays. The body depth is 4.5-5.0 times in standard length. The body of Pangasius krempfi is dark blackish-gray on the dorsal (top) and lateral (sides) surfaces, transitioning to silver-gray on the abdomen. The fins are lightly yellow in color. The dorsum (upper body) exhibits a sky-blue hue, but this species lacks the submarginal caudal-fin stripes typical of some other Pangasius species. Additionally, it does not feature a humeral spot, a characteristic found in certain other members of the genus.

The teeth of Pangasius krempfi are notable for their arrangement: the vomerine teeth are separate at the midline but are joined to the palatine teeth on each side, forming long crescentic patches. The species also possesses 18-22 gill rakers on the first gill arch.

== Habitat and distribution ==
Pangasius krempfi is found in the freshwater ecosystems of Southeast Asia, particularly within the Mekong river basin. The species inhabits rivers and streams, preferring environments with flowing water.

Pangasius krempfi like other species in the Pangasius genus, faces threats from habitat degradation, overfishing, and the expansion of commercial aquaculture.
