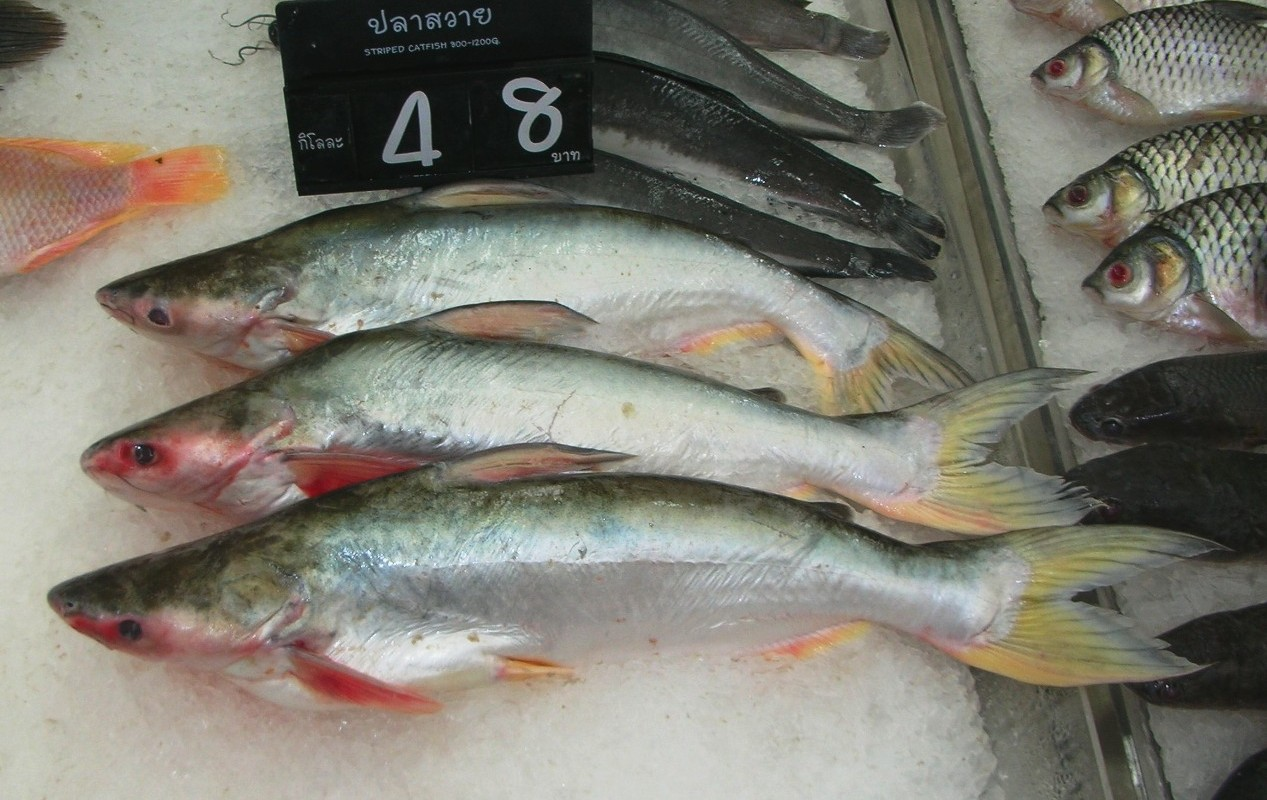
- Pangasius pangasius in Thailand

Conservation status
- Least Concern (IUCN 3.1)

Scientific classification
- Kingdom: Animalia
- Phylum: Chordata
- Class: Actinopterygii
- Order: Siluriformes
- Family: Pangasiidae
- Genus: Pangasius
- Species: P. pangasius

Binomial name
- Pangasius pangasius (Hamilton, 1822)

Synonyms
- Pangasius buchanani (Valenciennes, 1840); Pimelodus pangasius Hamilton, 1822; Pangasius pangasius pangasius (Hamilton, 1822); Pachypterus luridus Swainson, 1839; Pangasius pangasius godavarii David, 1962; Pangasius pangasius upiensis Srivastava, 1968

= Pangasius pangasius =

Species of fish

Pangasius pangasius, the Pangas catfish, is a species of shark catfish native to fresh and brackish waters of Bangladesh, India, and Pakistan. This species grows to a standard length of 150 to 300 centimetres and is a commercially important fish.

== Taxonomy ==
Pangasius pangasius was first described by Francis Buchanan-Hamilton in 1822. It is classified as a shark catfish (a member of the Pangasiidae family) in the class Actinopterygii. It has been referred to by several synonyms, including Pangasius pangasius pangasius, Pimelodus pangasius, Pangasius pangasius upiensis, Pangasius pangasius godavarii, and Pangasius buchanani.

== Description ==
P. pangasius grows to a maximum of 150 to 300 cm in standard length. The dorsal fin has two spines and seven soft rays. The anal fin has 29–32 soft rays. It has small eyes and yellow caudal fins.

== Distribution ==
Tolerant of fresh water and brackish water, this species is found in rivers, lakes, estuaries, and coastal waters of India, Bangladesh, and Pakistan. It has also been reported in Nepal. Formerly believed to inhabit Myanmar and Southeast Asia, these reports were misidentifications of other species.

== Ecology ==
P. pangasius breeds in estuaries during the rainy season. It consumes plants, shrimps, mollusks, and worms.

Though this species is abundant in most of its range, its population seems to be declining, especially in the Ganges River and Brahmaputra River. Its decline is a result of overfishing, as it is taken both for food and for sport fishing. Damming and pollution are additional threats to the population. Despite these threats and the signs of population decline, it is assessed as a least concern species on the IUCN Red List due to its continued robust population size.

This species is farmed in Thailand, Cambodia, and Vietnam.
