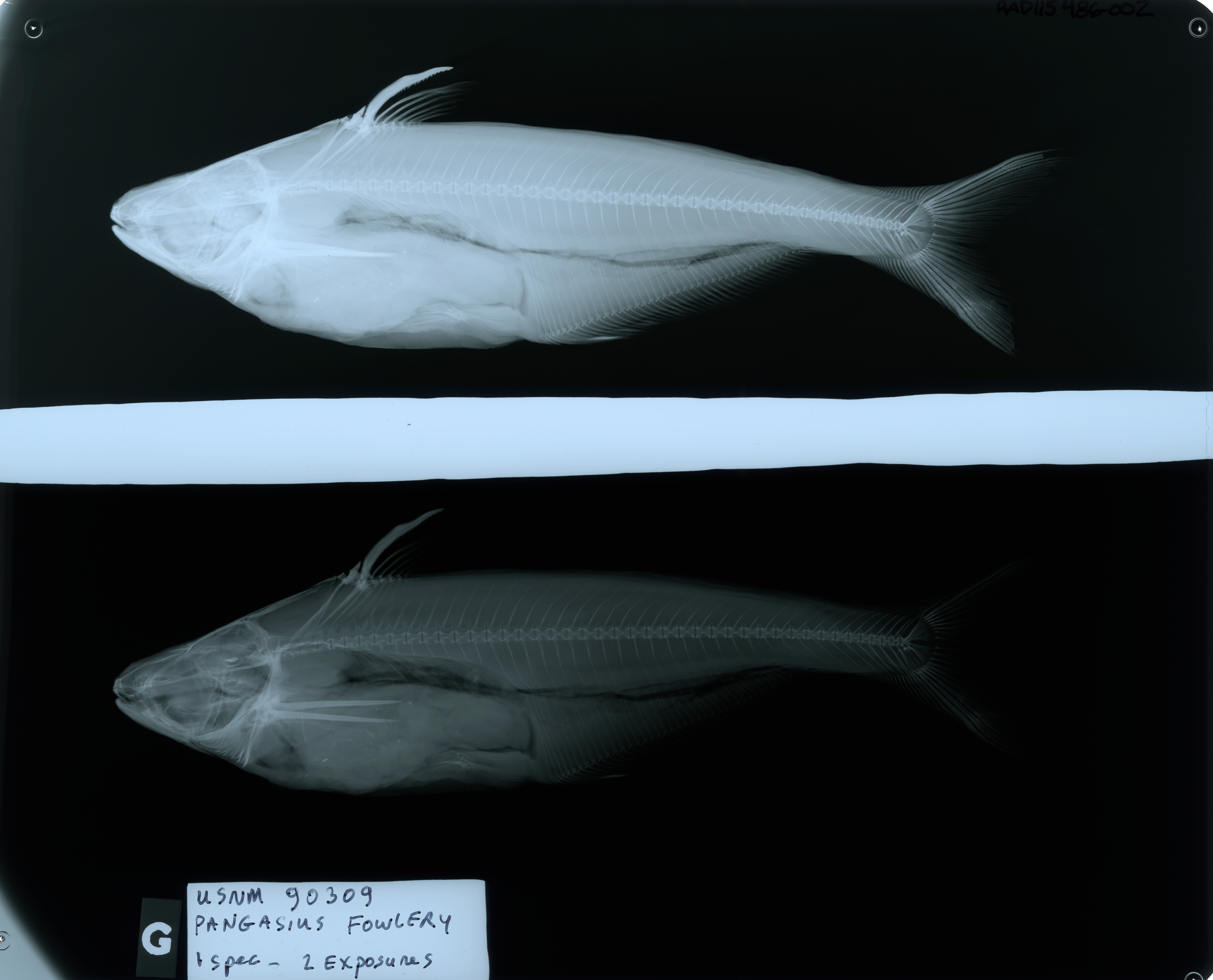
- Pseudolais pleurotaenia

Scientific classification
- Kingdom: Animalia
- Phylum: Chordata
- Class: Actinopterygii
- Order: Siluriformes
- Family: Pangasiidae
- Genus: Pseudolais; Vaillant, 1902

Synonyms
- Pteropangasius Fowler, 1937

= Pseudolais =

Genus of fishes

Pseudolais is a genus of shark catfishes native to Southeast Asia.

== Species ==
There are currently two recognized species in this genus:

- Pseudolais micronemus (Bleeker, 1846) (Shortbarbel pangasius)
- Pseudolais pleurotaenia (Sauvage, 1878)
