= Helicophagus =

Scientific classification
- Kingdom: Animalia
- Phylum: Chordata
- Class: Actinopterygii
- Order: Siluriformes
- Family: Pangasiidae
- Genus: Helicophagus; Bleeker, 1858

Type species
- Helicophagus typus Bleeker, 1858

Genus of fishes

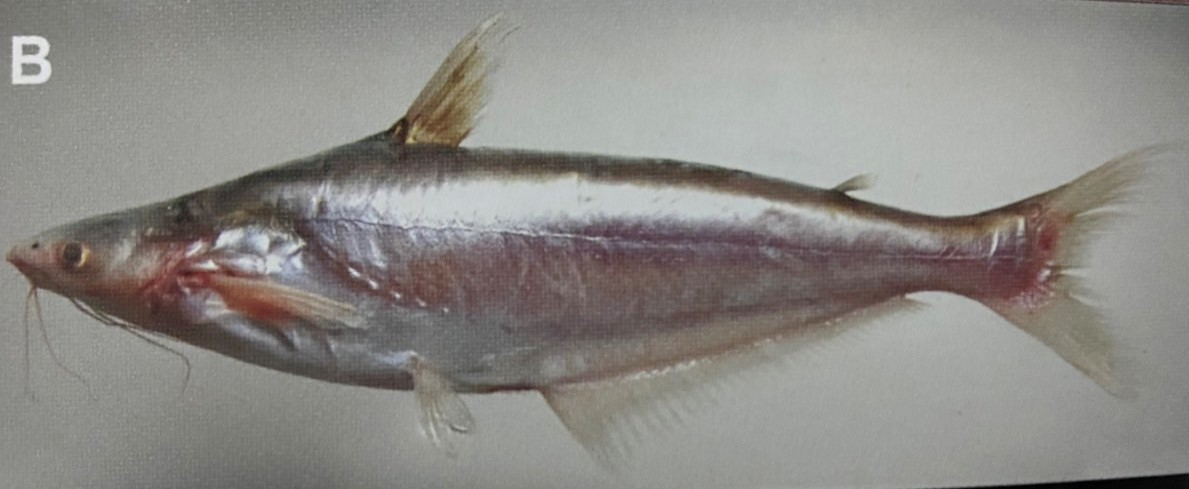
Helicophagus Leptorhynchus (also known as Patin Muncung in Indonesian)

Helicophagus is a genus of shark catfishes native to Southeast Asia.

== Species ==
There are currently three recognized species in this genus:

- Helicophagus leptorhynchus Ng & Kottelat, 2000
- Helicophagus typus Bleeker, 1857
- Helicophagus waandersii Bleeker, 1858

H. leptorhynchus is known from the Chao Phraya and Mekong River drainages in Indochina. H. typus inhabits rivers of Sumatra and southeast Borneo. H. waandersii is known from medium- to large-sized rivers of Sumatra and Peninsular Malaysia.

H. leptorhynchus grows to about 47.2 centimetres (18.6 in) SL. H. typus reaches a length of about 37.7 cm (14.8 in) TL. H. waandersii has a maximum recorded length of about 70.0 cm (27.6 in) TL.

The stomachs of the specimens of H. waandersii are more or less filled with mollusks, usually bivalves. H. waandersii enters flooded forests. H. waandersii migrates upstream when water levels begin to rise at the beginning of the flood season and moves downstream as water clears at the end of the flood season.

Unlike H. waandersii, H. leptorhynchus stays in permanent river channels and does not move into flooded forests. However, it also migrates upstream and downstream with changes in the water level. H. leptorhynchus feeds primarily on bivalves.
