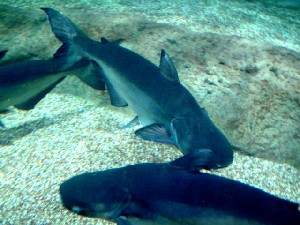
- Pangasianodon gigas

Scientific classification
- Kingdom: Animalia
- Phylum: Chordata
- Class: Actinopterygii
- Order: Siluriformes
- Family: Pangasiidae
- Genus: Pangasianodon; Chevey, 1931

Type species
- Pangasianodon gigas Chevey 1931

= Pangasianodon =

Genus of fishes

Pangasianodon is a genus of large to very large shark catfishes native to the Mekong and Chao Phraya Rivers in Southeast Asia and adjacent China.

== Species ==
Two species in this genus are recognized:

- Pangasianodon gigas Chevey, 1931 (Mekong giant catfish)
- Pangasianodon hypophthalmus (Sauvage, 1878) (iridescent shark)

Despite local protection and quite widespread awareness of the giant catfish and its critically endangered status, the species is gravely threatened by the build-out of hydroelectric dams on the Mekong River and its tributaries, and by fishing. Though the species is being propagated in Thailand, Thai stock is reported to be contaminated by hybridization with P. hypophthalmus, with hybrids having been carelessly released into the wild. Cambodia currently offers the best opportunities for conservation intervention through dovetailed efforts in captive propagation, reintroduction, and habitat protection.

The striped catfish P. hypophthalmus - well known to home aquarists as the "iridescent shark"- is endangered in the wild, yet is mass-produced in aquaculture and readily available both as an aquarium fish and as fillets through most of the developed world. While still considerably more common in the wild than its immense sister species, like it, P. hypophthalmus merits a field-based conservation program in Cambodia.

Recent field work has begun to reveal some of the secrets of pangasiid catfishes, including these two species. However omnipresent as commodities in the wealthier nations, the two Pangasianodon species remain astonishingly little known as important components of the Mekong basin's rich but greatly threatened living heritage.
