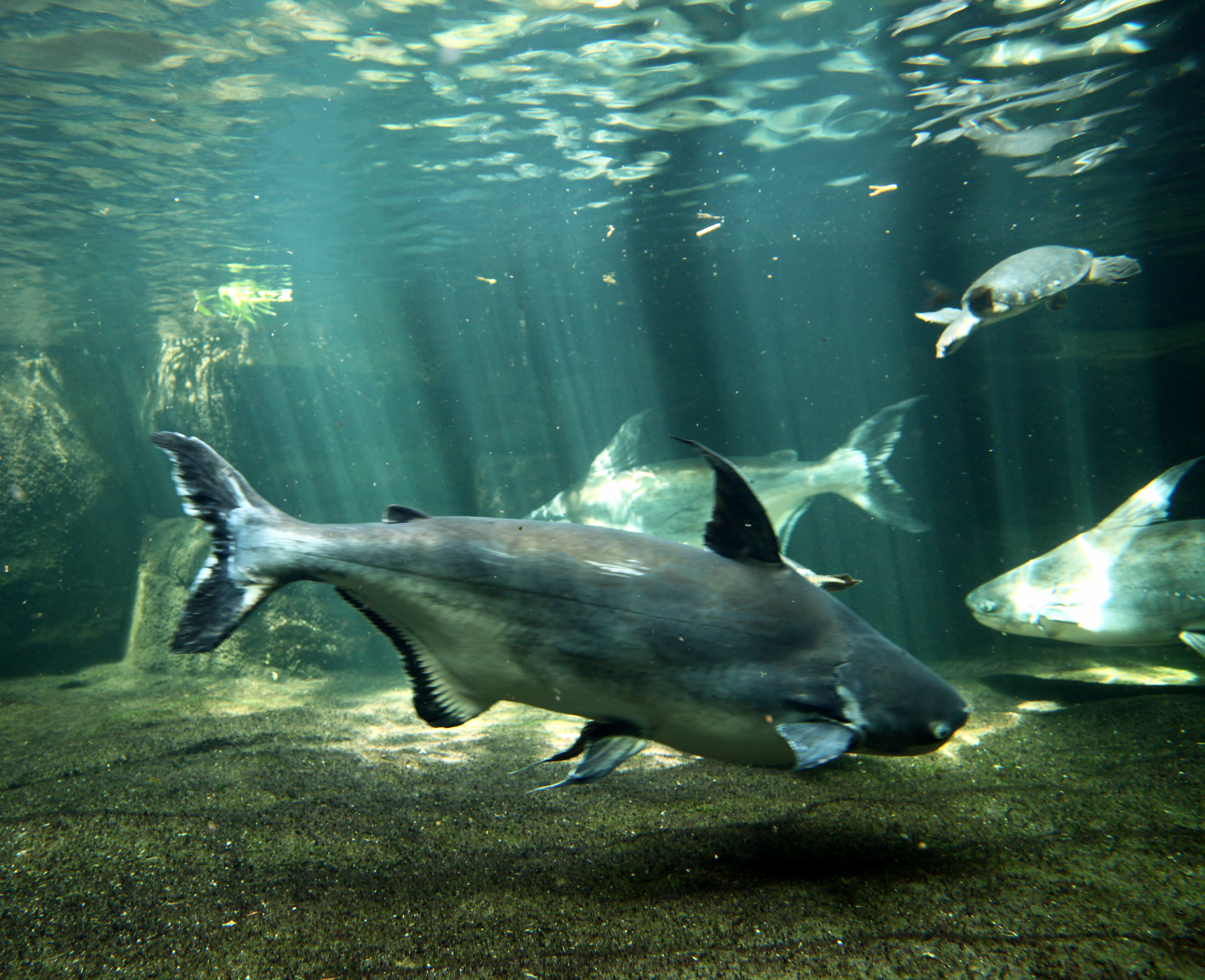
- At Berlin Aquarium, Germany

Conservation status
- Critically Endangered (IUCN 3.1)

Scientific classification
- Kingdom: Animalia
- Phylum: Chordata
- Class: Actinopterygii
- Order: Siluriformes
- Family: Pangasiidae
- Genus: Pangasius
- Species: P. sanitwongsei

Binomial name
- Pangasius sanitwongsei Smith, 1931

Synonyms
- Pangasius beani Smith, 1931; Pangasius sanitwangsei Smith, 1931

= Giant pangasius =

Species of freshwater fish

The giant pangasius, paroon shark, or Chao Phraya giant catfish (Pangasius sanitwongsei) is a species of large freshwater fish in the shark catfish family (Pangasiidae) of order Siluriformes, found in the Chao Phraya and Mekong basins in Indochina. Its populations have declined drastically, mainly due to overfishing, and it is now considered Critically Endangered.

== Etymology ==
The specific name sanitwongsei was chosen by H.M. Smith to honor M. R. Suwaphan Sanitwong (Thai: ม.ร.ว.สุวพรรณ สนิทวงศ์) for his support of fisheries in Thailand.

== Physical characteristics ==
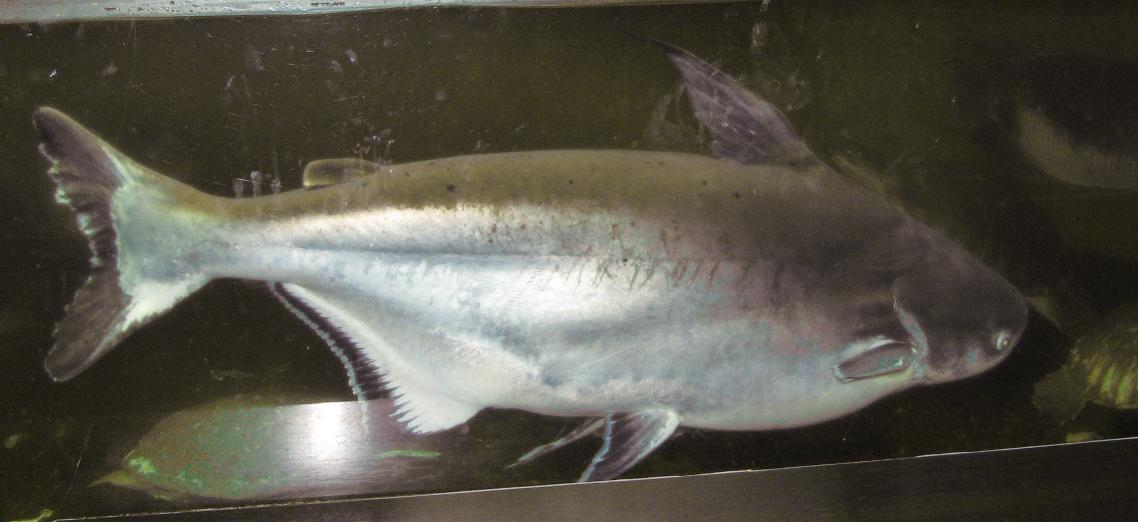
An adult giant Pangasius raised in captivity

The giant pangasius is a typical member of the Pangasiidae commonly known as shark catfishes, which swim off the bottom unlike other catfish families. The species has a silver, curved underside and a dark brown back, possessing dusky melanophores that helps them camouflage. They have a wide, flat, whisker-less head. Its body is compressed and elongate, with a depressed head. It has a continuous and uninterrupted single vomero-palatine tooth-patch which is curved. The first soft ray of their dorsal, pectoral and pelvic fins are extended into filaments. Its fins often contrast with its body, being dark grey to black. The anal fin has 26 rays and the serrated pectoral fin-spine is similar in size to the dorsal spine.

Fully grown giant pangasius can reach 300 centimetres (9.8 ft) SL in length and weigh up to 300 kg (660 lb), though they are typically 2 meters.

== Habitat ==
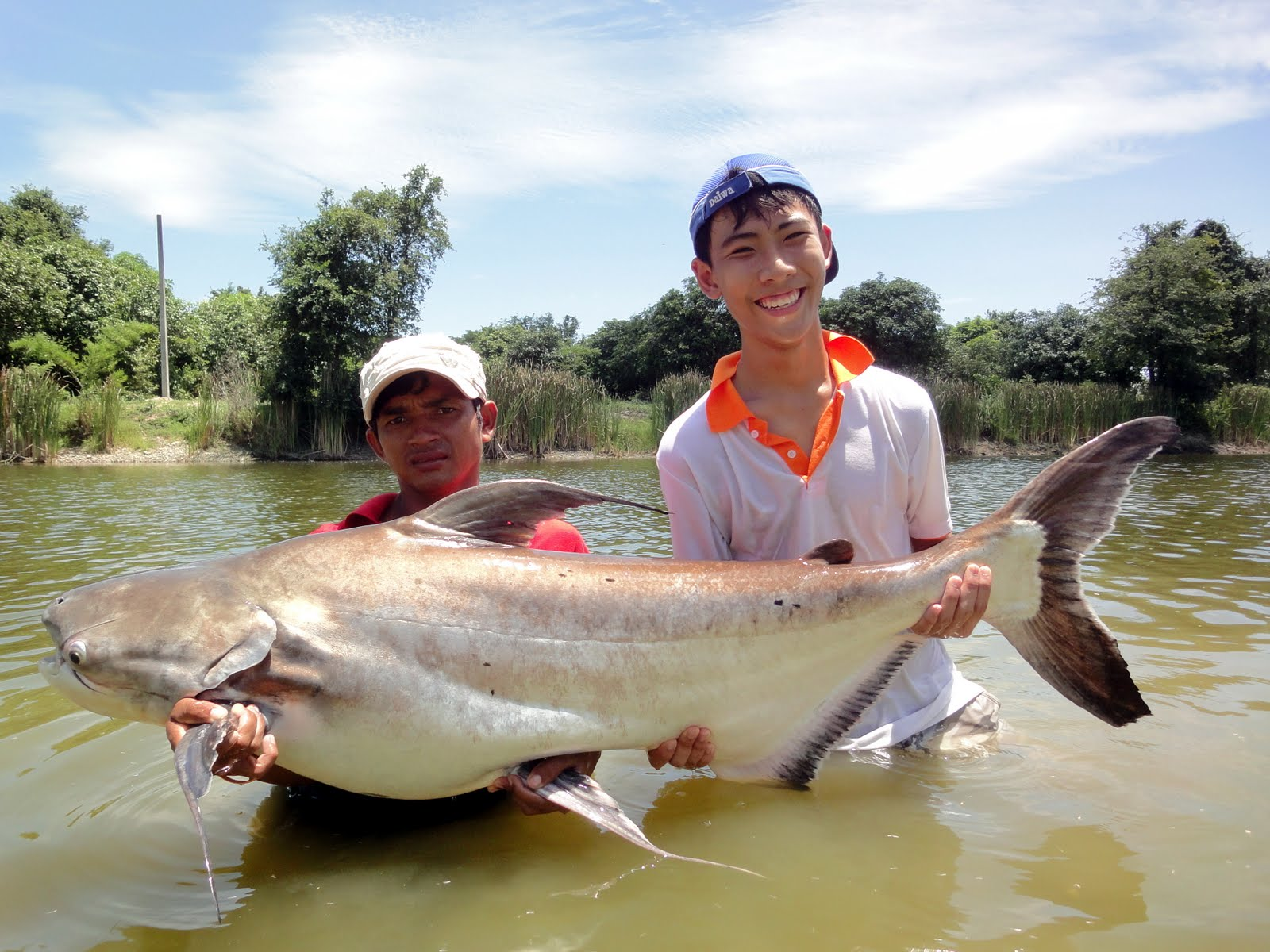
A giant pangasius caught in the Chao Phraya River in Thailand

The species is native to the Mekong and Chao Phraya rivers that run through China, Cambodia, Thailand, Viet Nam, and the Lao People's Democratic Republic. It has been introduced to central Anatolia, South Africa, and Malaysia.

Pangasius sanitwongsei is tolerant of poor water quality, mainly in brackish waters, and prefers to live in the bottom of deep depressions in freshwater rivers. There are currently two sub-populations of Paroon Shark separated by the Khone Falls which they do not migrate over.

== Biology ==
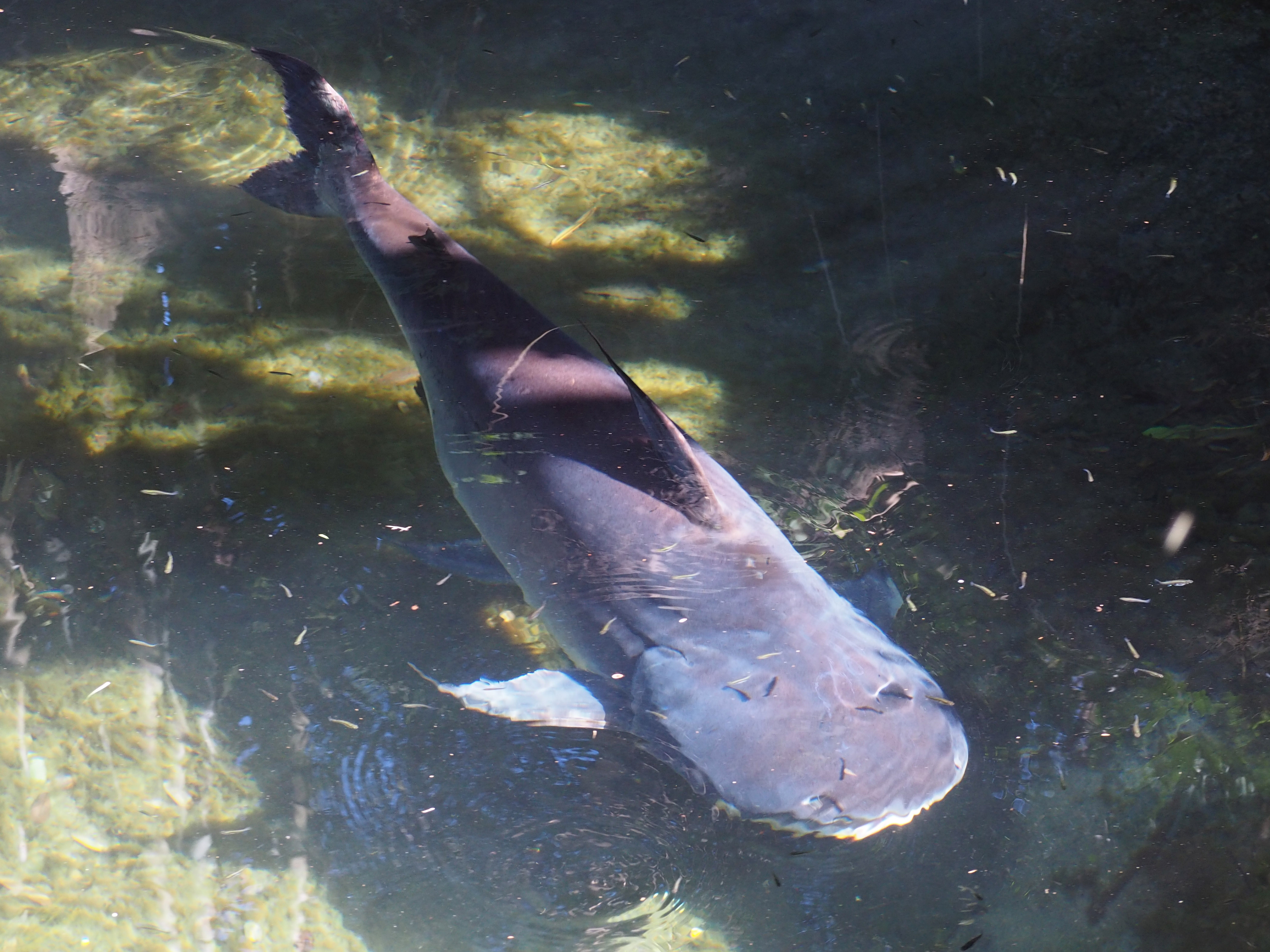
At Disney's Animal Kingdom

The giant pangasius is a benthopelagic and migratory species. The species is predatory, with juveniles and adults feed on crustaceans and fishes. These fish typically spawn just prior to the monsoon season. It is believed that the giant pangasius prey on shrimp, crabs, and fish and hideout in deep areas in rivers. Since the fish lives on the bottom, it is also known to feed on larger animals' carcasses. Due to it being both an apex predator and a bottom-dwelling fish, it limits the populations of smaller fish as many catfish species. P. sanitwongsei's role in the ecosystem is the top predator, therefore inflicts top down control on the population. Top predators aid in the limitation of smaller organisms and in this case they prey on smaller fish keeping the smaller fish in check. Without these carnivorous predators, the smaller fish could overpopulate and throw the food chain into imbalance. Due to overharvesting, the native fish population may increase since P. sanitwongsei's population is declining.

P. sanitwongsei undergo seasonal migration within the rivers it inhabits.

=== Life history ===
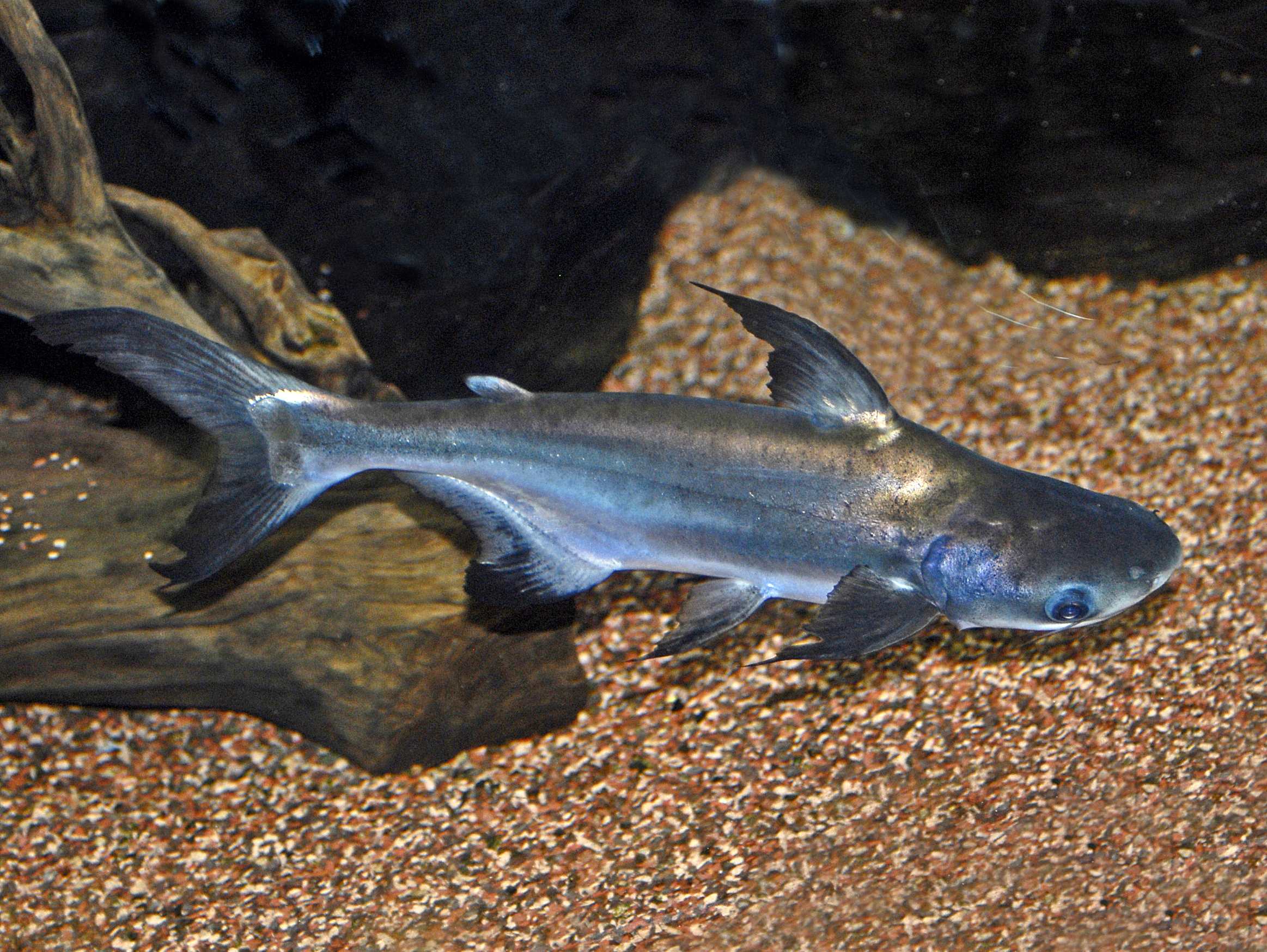
Juvenile

Little is known of the reproduction of P. sanitwongsei, but the time of spawning happens in the months of April and May. It is predicted that spawning happens in the rivers where they are found; they are not believed to be migrating from outside the river when getting ready to spawn.

Eggs and sperm are usually released in a muddier area to prevent eggs from sticking to each other. The number of eggs per spawning session is around 600 (with a diameter of 2–2.5mm) and the brood shows low genetic variation. Like many fish, there is no parental care.

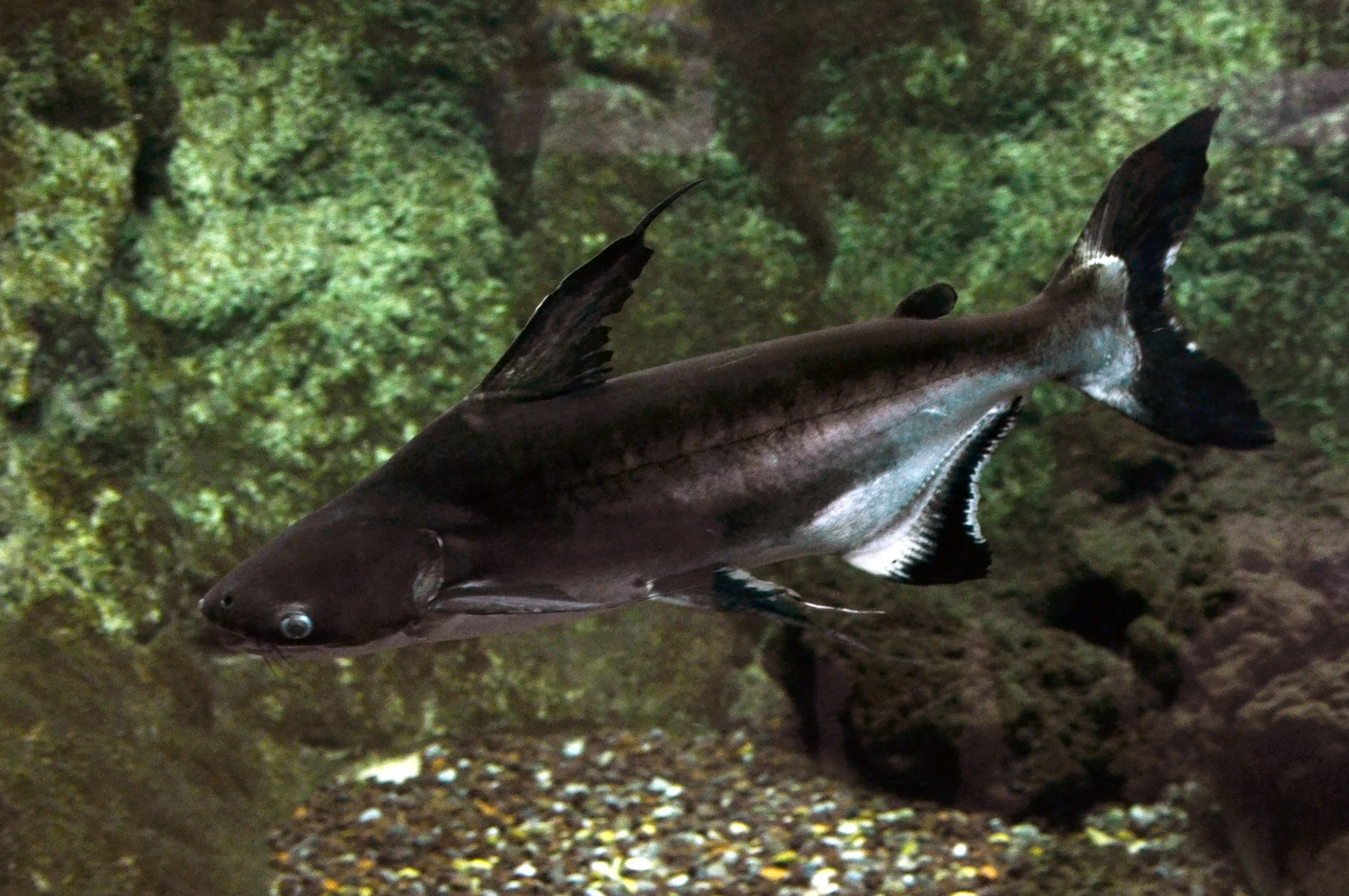
At the Palais de la Porte Dorée in France

This fish's lifespan isn't known, but it is known that it grows fast and usually the trend is when it grows fast, it dies quickly. The possible reasoning for this could be the fact that there is over-fishing of the species.

== Relationship to humans ==
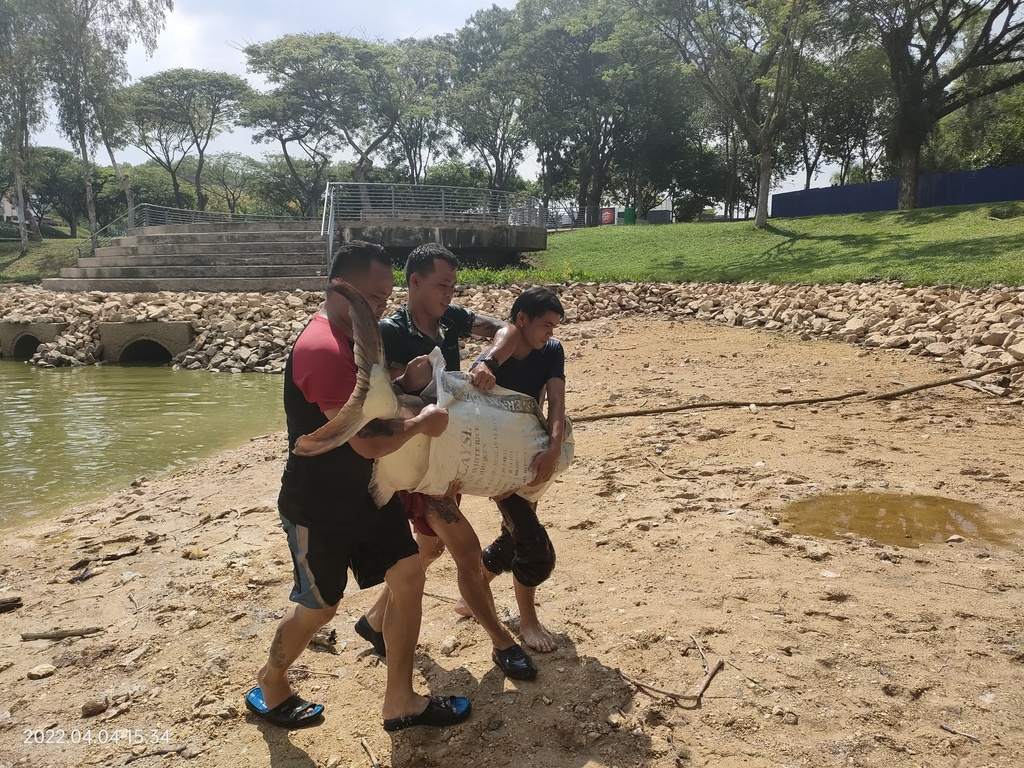
Giant pangasius fished in Malaysia

Fishing of this species used to be accompanied by religious ceremonies and rites. It is often mentioned in textbooks, news media, and popular press. This fish is a popular food fish and marketed fresh. This fish is important to many locals that reside in the regions where the rivers run through as this is an important food source. Many fishing villages rely on the organisms that reside in the river to provide food for their family as well as a source of income as they can sell them at markets. Due to this fish's large range, it can show us migratory pathways and spawning habits and areas that should be protected, and other areas that can be harvested. This species of fish is also important to fisheries as it can grow to large sizes, even in captivity, and build an economy that relies heavily on fish and other water species. This was a significant reason why it was introduced to rivers in South Africa. In addition to fishing for religious purposes, they are also hunted for sport as they are the largest of their kind. They are considered trophy fish and are hunted for prestige and fame. The downside is that these individuals are the most fecund and mature which leads to a decrease in population if too many are harvested at one time. This further makes them a topic of conservation as they play key roles in their ecosystem.

These fish sometimes appear in the aquarium fish hobby. Most specimens do not reach their full size without an extremely large aquarium or pond. There is even a "balloon" form of this fish where the fish has an unusually short and stocky body.

=== Conservation ===
This fish is highly protected and has a high conservation value and is banned from being fished through all seasons. The fish is being threatened by overharvesting, damming of rivers, and pollution. Their population continues to decline as there are not many legislations and enforcement toward this species. A common threat to these large organisms is dams and segmentation of the Mekong River. The Paroon shark travels upstream to spawn and resides downstream. The construction of dams leads to segmentation of the natural habitat, preventing their migration up and down the river. Even though the bodies of water are interconnected these fish are not capable of swimming through walls to get to their natural breeding sites.

To control the amount of overharvesting (via fishing) that occurs certain size and catch limits can be put in place. In 1989, the Paroon shark was listed as a class II protected species by the government of Yunnan, China. The issue is that the habitat of this species lies in multiple countries' domains including Cambodia, Lao People's Democratic Republic, Thailand, and Viet Nam. Restrictions in parts of the river that reside in China's territory, leave the other parts to be unprotected.

A known breeding practice, to try and help the population, is being practiced by the Thai government. A halt on harvesting has been recommended until P. sanitwongsei's population can rise to a safe level. Even though these fish are grown in a safe fishery, this can reduce the genetic diversity between them making them more susceptible to disease as well as environmental stress.

There are some groups in the Asian continent who have been trying to protect and conserve the wildlife in these regions including the Asian Species Action Partnership (ASAP), World Wildlife Fund (WWF), and the Species Survival Commission (SSC), part of the International Union for the Conservation of Nature (IUCN).

The giant pangasius is considered an umbrella species in conservation. Protecting this species would provide protection for species that inhabit the same region. With this tactic, a whole ecosystem can be preserved. Due to this area being an area that is highly fished commercially and locally, certain regulations can be put in place to manage the size of the fish that can be caught allowing mature adults to reproduce with greater success.

== See also ==
- List of freshwater aquarium fish species
