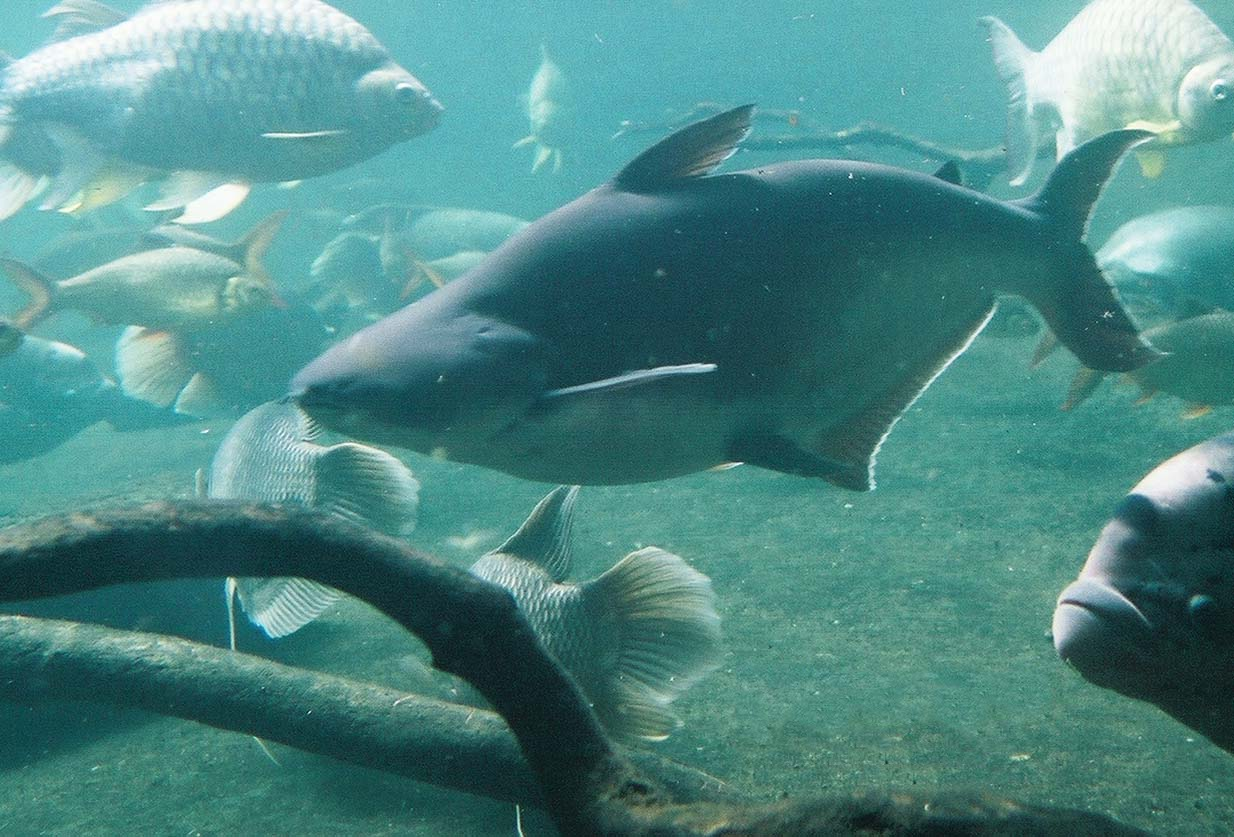

Conservation status
- Endangered (IUCN 3.1)

Scientific classification
- Kingdom: Animalia
- Phylum: Chordata
- Class: Actinopterygii
- Division: Teleostei
- Order: Siluriformes
- Family: Pangasiidae
- Genus: Pangasianodon
- Species: P. hypophthalmus

Binomial name
- Pangasianodon hypophthalmus (Sauvage, 1878)

Synonyms
- Helicophagus hypophthalmus Sauvage, 1878; Pangasius sutchi Fowler, 1937; Pangasius hypophthalmus (Sauvage, 1878)

= Iridescent shark =

Species of fish

Global aquaculture production of Pangasianodon hypophthalmus in million tonnes from 1950 to 2022, as reported by the FAO

The iridescent shark or iridescent shark catfish (Pangasianodon hypophthalmus) is a species of shark catfish (family Pangasiidae) native to the rivers of Southeast Asia. Despite its name, it is not a real shark. It is found in the Mekong basin as well as the Chao Phraya River, and is heavily cultivated for food.

The meat is often marketed under the common name swai (from Thai สวาย). It has also been introduced into other river basins as a food source, and its striking appearance and iridescence have made it popular with fishkeeping hobbyists, among whom it is also known as the Siamese shark catfish or sutchi catfish. The swai's omnivorous diet consists of crustaceans, other fish, and plant matter.

== Names ==
The fish is named for the glow or iridescence exhibited in juveniles, as well as the shark-like appearance of this and other shark catfish.

== Description ==
Adults reach up to 130 cm (4.3 ft) in length and can weigh up to a maximum of 44 kg (97 lb). They have a shiny, iridescent color that gives these fish their name. However, large adults are uniformly grey. The fins are dark grey or black. Juveniles have a black stripe along the lateral line and a second black stripe below the lateral line.

== Distribution and habitat ==
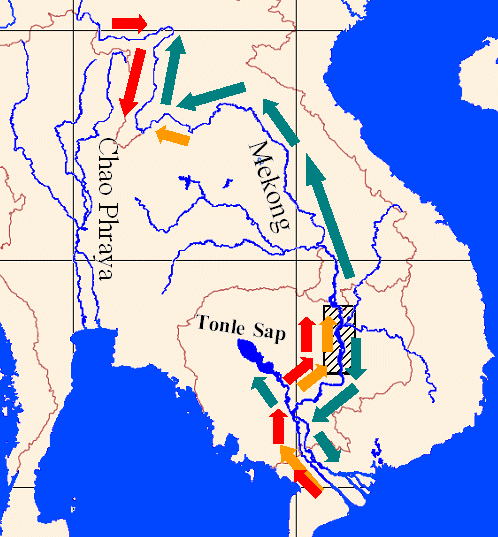
P. hypophthalmus migrations in the Mekong River Orange: March to May Dark green: May to September Red: October to February Shaded region: spawning region of the southern Mekong population between Khone Falls and Kratie

Iridescent sharks originate in the large rivers Chao Phraya and Mekong in Asia, though they have been introduced into other rivers for aquaculture. They are a freshwater fish that natively live in a tropical climate and prefer water with a 6.5–7.5 pH, a water hardness of 2.0–29 dGH, and a temperature range of 22–26 °C (72–79 °F). They can tolerate hypoxic conditions thanks to their swim bladder which can be used as an air-breathing organ. They prefer large bodies of water similar to the deep waters of their native Mekong river basin.

The iridescent shark is a migratory fish that in most regions moves upstream to spawn during the flood season while the waters are high and returns downstream to seek rearing habitats when the river water levels recede. The dates of the migrations vary depending on the river system. In the Mekong river basin, they migrate upstream in May to July and return downstream during September through December. South of the Khone Falls, upstream migration occurs in October to February, with its peak in November to December; here, it appears to be triggered by receding waters at the end of the flood season.

In August 2015, an environmental group in Santander, Colombia, confirmed that iridescent sharks had been found in one of the tributaries that feed into the Magdalena River, having been accidentally introduced from illegal farm fisheries in the area. The find has caused alarm amongst the scientific community and government officials, as the Magdalena river is home to over 200 native fish species, 35 of which are endangered.

Disruption to these sharks can come from many physical stressors, including but not limited to shear forces, rapid decompression, blade strike and turbulence. These can lead to and have led to an increase in the Injury and mortality rate of these sharks. This is a sad reality since these injuries can be caused by hydropower developments which are being put into place to combat the global climate crisis that is being faced. Iridescent sharks are also introduced to other Southeast Asia countries for food, especially Peninsular Malaysia, Singapore, Indonesia and Myanmar. In Malaysia, Singapore and Indonesia they are called ikan patin (which 'ikan' means fish in Malay and Indonesian), Malaysian Chinese prefer them steamed or cooked in whole, while Malay prefer cooking these fishes with Tempoyak and curry.

In Thailand, swai fish are commonly found in rivers and canals that run past important Buddhist temples or waterside places. Swai live in large schools, sometimes with other fish such as spot pangasius and red-tailed tinfoil with tinfoil barb. Fish that live in that area, people won't catch them, and often feed them (usually bread), which is considered a merit-making and fun activity.

== Culinary profile ==
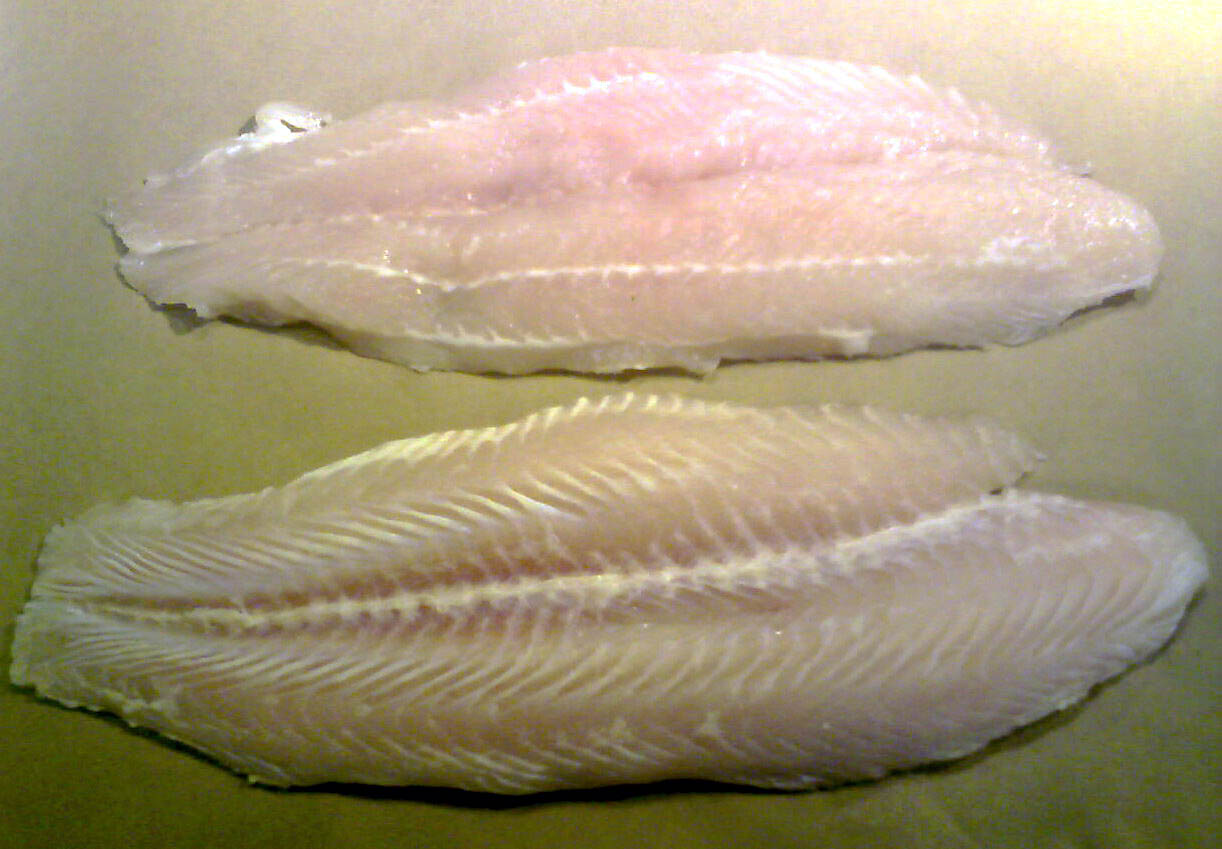
Swai fillet as sold in the United States

Pangasius does not have a gourmet reputation and is sold cheaply as swai (/swaɪ/, from Thai สวาย s̄wāy) in the United States, panga (or pangas) in Europe and cream dory and basa in several Asian countries and in Australia and the UK.

Despite its lowly reputation, the total export of pangasius from Vietnam reached US$1.8 billion in 2014.

Pangasius fillets are an increasingly popular product because of their low cost, mild taste and firm texture. Recipes for other whitefish such as sole or halibut can be adapted to pangasius.

Pangasius is an omnivorous fish, and thus does not require a high level of animal protein in its diet. Typical grading sizes are 3–5 oz (85–140 g), 5–7 oz (140–200 g), and 7–9 oz (200–260 g).

== In the aquarium ==
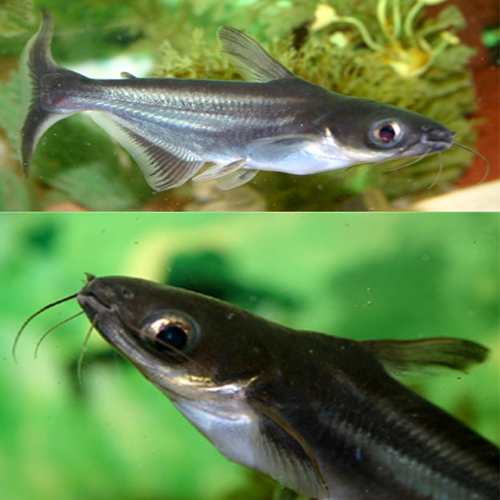
A juvenile Pangasianodon hypophthalmus

While juvenile iridescent sharks are sold as pets for home aquariums, they are not easy fish to keep. Iridescent sharks are schooling fish that prefer groups, are accustomed to living in rivers, and are active fish that require space. They have very poor eyesight, so detected movement from outside of their habitat can be seen as a threat. If stressed, their first instinct is to flee; a blind dash can cause injury in an aquarium environment. These injuries may result in the fish sinking to the bottom, where it may lie on its side or back until it recovers.

Iridescent sharks require a minimum tank size of 12 m (39 ft) to develop naturally. Schools require even larger tanks. If given enough room and fed adequately, they can reach 1 m (3.3 ft) in length. In most home aquaria, the lack of space stunts their growth. For this reason, most iridescent sharks kept in home aquaria grow to 15 to 30 cm (6 to 12 in) in length only and may die prematurely. When provided adequately sized aquaria and proper husbandry, iridescent sharks may live into their teens and grow to full size.

== See also ==
- List of freshwater aquarium fish species
