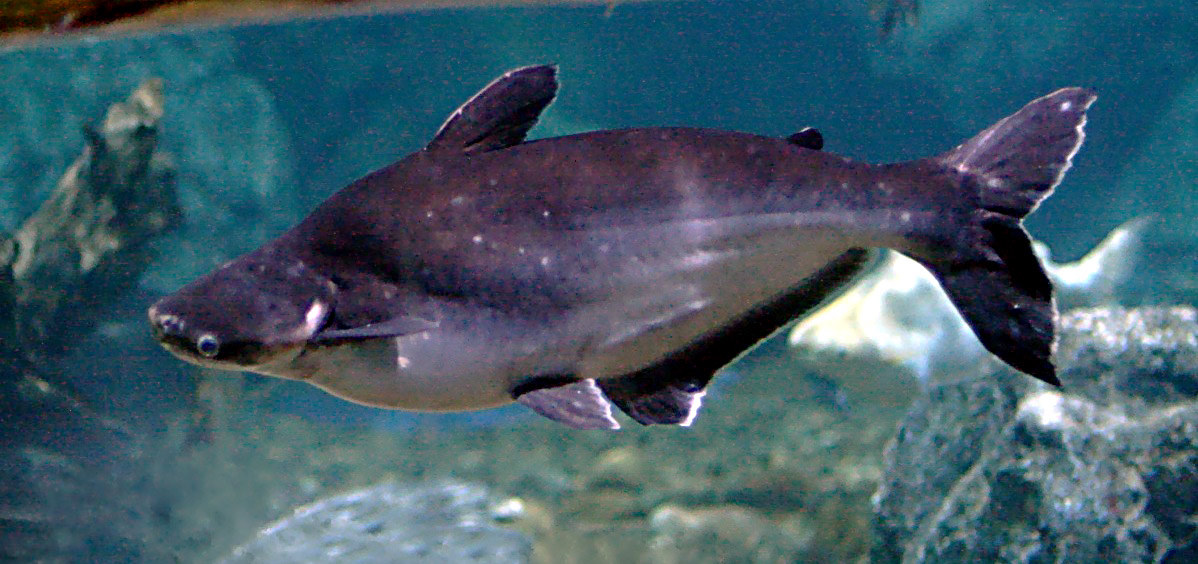
- Pangasius hypophthalmus

Scientific classification
- Kingdom: Animalia
- Phylum: Chordata
- Class: Actinopterygii
- Order: Siluriformes
- Suborder: Siluroidei
- Superfamily: Arioidea
- Family: Pangasiidae; Bleeker, 1858

Genera
- †Cetopangasius; Helicophagus; Pangasianodon; Pangasius; Pseudolais

= Shark catfish =

Shark catfish Temporal range: Miocene–Recent

Family of fishes

The shark catfishes form the family Pangasiidae. They are found in fresh and brackish waters across southern Asia, from Pakistan to Borneo. Among the 30-odd members of this family is the plant-eating, endangered Mekong giant catfish Pangasianodon gigas, one of the largest known freshwater fish. Several species are aquacultured for food, with Vietnam's Mekong Delta being a prominent locale for the industry.

== Description ==
The dorsal fin is located far forward, close to the head, and is often high and triangular, thus inspiring the common name. The anal fin is somewhat lengthy, with 26–46 rays. Usually, they have two pairs of barbels, maxillary barbels and one pair of chin barbels, though adult Mekong giant catfish have only maxillary barbels. Pangasiids have compressed bodies and single small adipose fins.

== Taxonomy ==
Pangasiidae forms a monophyletic group: a number of studies had indicated the group should be a part of the family Schilbeidae, but subsequent studies have disproven this. The following cladogram is based on a detailed PhyML-phylogeny based on the analysis of the partial cox1 sequences:

- Ictaluridae
- - Cranoglanididae
  - - Austroglanididae
    - Pangasiidae
      - Pangasianodon
        - Pangasianodon gigas
        - Pangasianodon hypophthalmus
      - - - - Pseudolais pleurotaenia
            - Pseudolais micronema
          - - Pangasius elongatus
            - Pangasius macronema
        - - - Helicophagus spp.
            - Pangasius krempfi
          - - - Pangasius conchophilus
              - - Pangasius sanitwongsei
                - - Pangasius djambal
                  - Pangasius bocourti
            - - Pangasius larnaudii
              - - Pangasius mekongensis
                - Pangasius pangasius

Two fossil pangasiid species are described, Cetopangasius chaetobranchus from the Miocene, and Pangasius indicus, from the Eocene. However, the reported age of P. indicus from the Eocene is debatable, as the Sipang Fauna stratum where it is found has never been officially dated. Therefore, the earliest reliable pangasiid fossil age is of C. chaetobranchus from the Miocene.
