= Culinary diplomacy =

Type of cultural diplomacy

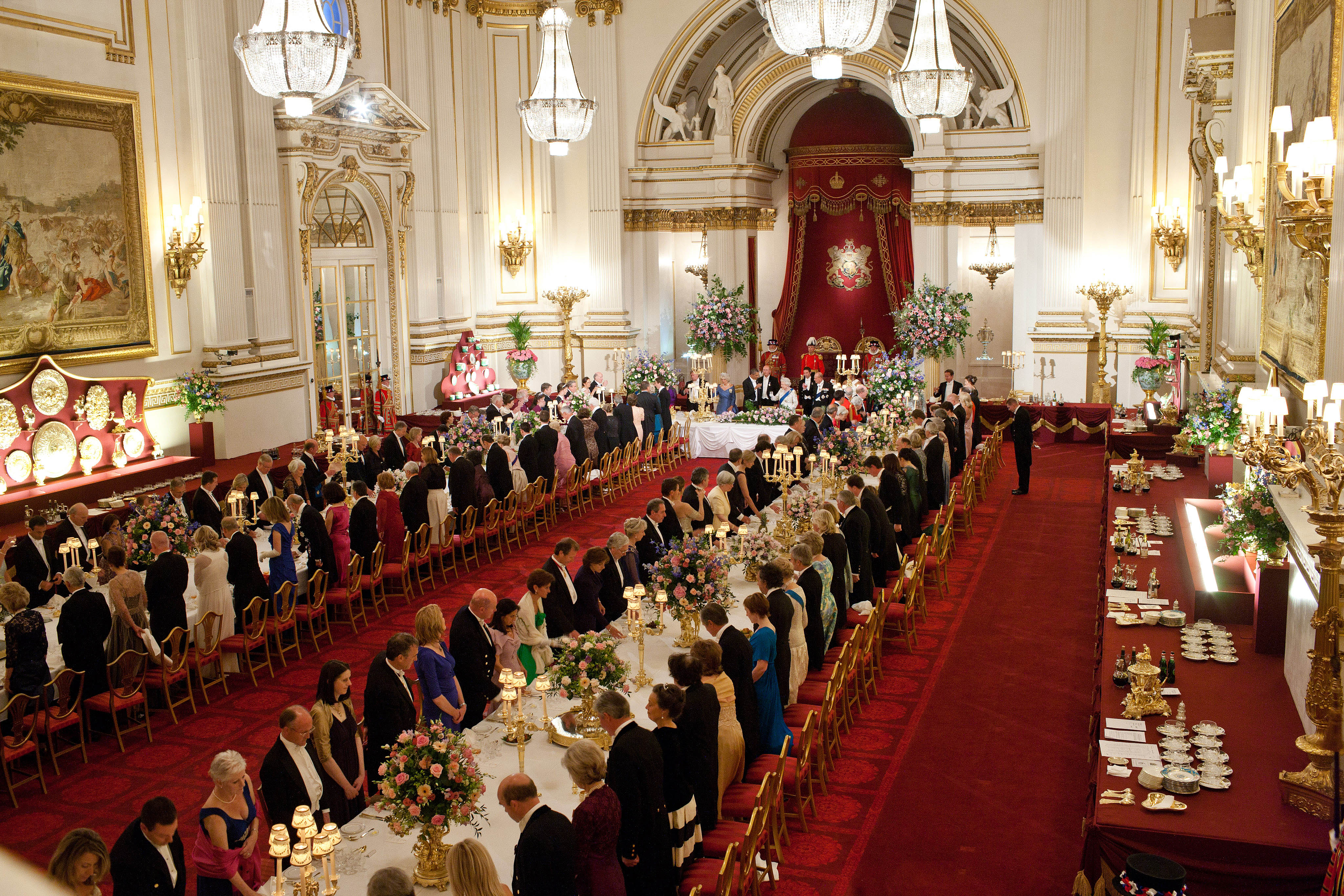
24 May 2011: President Barack Obama and First Lady Michelle Obama attend a state banquet hosted by Queen Elizabeth II at Buckingham Palace in London.

Culinary diplomacy, gastrodiplomacy or food diplomacy is a type of cultural diplomacy, which itself is a subset of public diplomacy. Its basic premise is that "the easiest way to win hearts and minds is through the stomach".

Official government-sponsored culinary diplomacy programs have been established in the following countries: Cambodia, Indonesia, Israel, Japan, Lebanon, Malaysia, Nordic countries, Peru, Singapore, South Korea, Switzerland, Taiwan, Thailand, and the United States.

== Background and definitions ==
The terms "culinary diplomacy" and "gastrodiplomacy" have been in use since the early 2000s, and have been popularized by the work of public diplomacy scholars Paul Rockower and Sam Chapple-Sokol. An early mention of the concept was in a 2002 Economist article about the Thai Kitchen of the World program.

=== Paul Rockower and Sam Chapple-Sokol ===
In a 2011 article published in the Taiwanese journal Issues & Studies, Rockower wrote that "Gastrodiplomacy is predicated on the notion that the easiest way to win hearts and minds is through the stomach." Chapple-Sokol wrote in a 2013 article in the journal The Hague Journal of Diplomacy that culinary diplomacy is "the use of food and cuisine as an instrument to create cross-cultural understanding in the hopes of improving interactions and cooperation." Whoever the target, culinary diplomacy is meant to improve the nation brand. This is theoretically achieved by changing the conversation surrounding a country to focus on an apolitical and positive facet of its culture. In a preliminary, empirical study of the gastrodiplomacy programs of several countries, gastrodiplomacy was shown to have had success in improving the nation brand.

==== Culinary diplomacy versus gastrodiplomacy ====
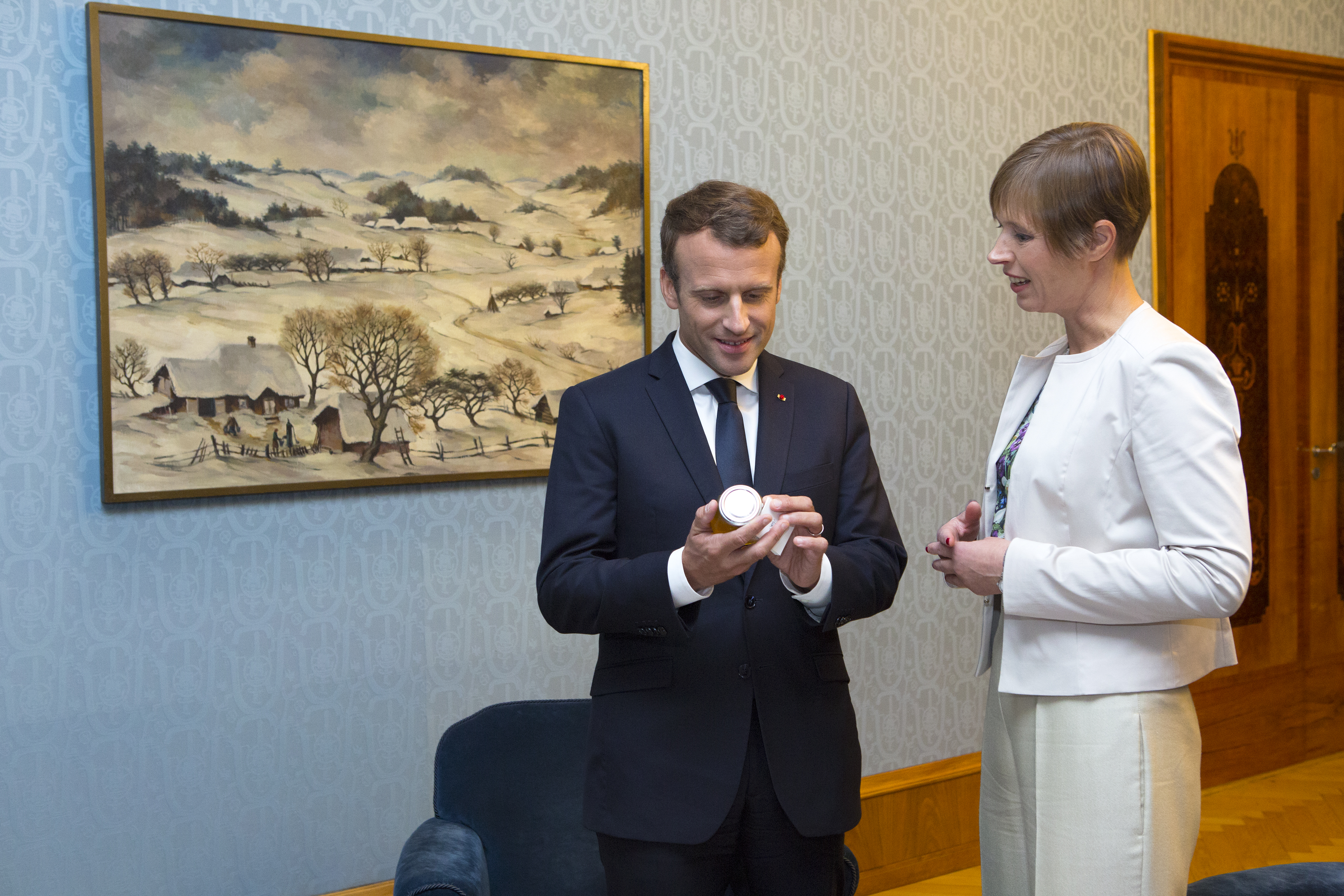
Estonian President Kersti Kaljulaid offering rose honey to French President Emmanuel Macron in 2017.

The two terms "culinary diplomacy" and "gastrodiplomacy" are used interchangeably by many, though some scholars have differentiated the terms. Rockower, for example, claims that gastrodiplomacy refers to a tool of public diplomacy, while culinary diplomacy serves as "a means to further diplomatic protocol through cuisine". Chapple-Sokol writes that both of these fall under the broad categorization of "culinary diplomacy", and differentiates between public and private culinary diplomacy. The former refers to culinary diplomacy being used as a tool of public diplomacy, and more specifically cultural diplomacy, while the latter "occurs behind closed doors", akin to Rockower's definition. However, later Chapple-Sokol went on to redefine "gastrodiplomacy" as specifically the "government-to-foreign public engagement" and one of the three pillars making up the broader culinary diplomacy.

=== Gastronationalism ===
Gastronationalism or culinary nationalism is a related concept involving the use of food and its history, production, control, preparation and consumption as a way of promoting nationalism and national identity. It may involve arguments between two or more regions or countries about whether a particular dish or preparation is claimed by one of those regions or countries and has been appropriated or co-opted by the others. Examples of gastronationalism include efforts by state bodies, nongovernmental bodies, businesses and business groups, and individuals.

== Examples of culinary diplomacy programs by country ==
In alphabetical order

=== Cambodia ===
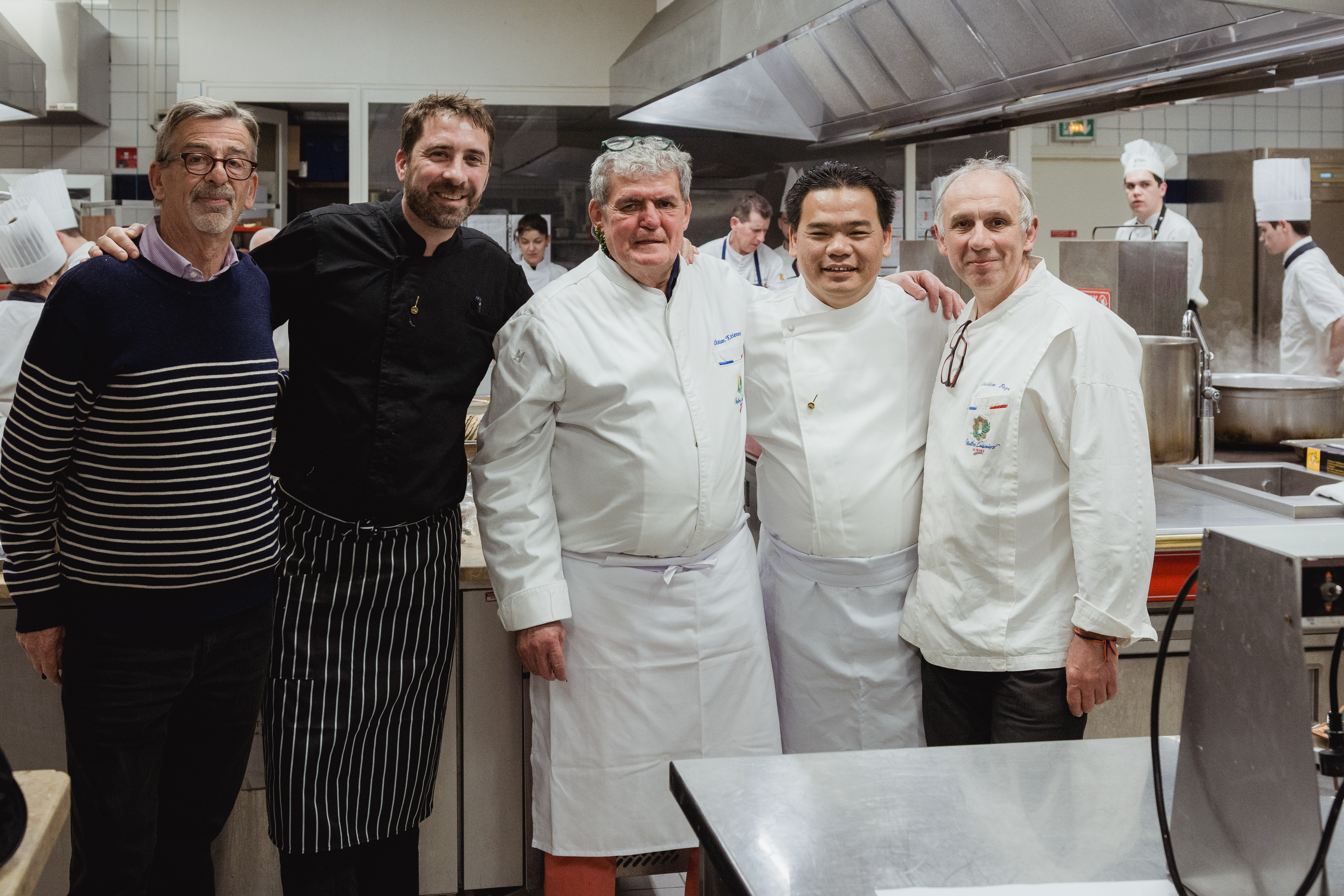
Cambodian chef Luu Meng (second from right) with his business partner Richard Gillet (second from left) in Avignon, France in 2016 promoting Cambodian cuisine.

In December 2020, the Ministry of Foreign Affairs and International Cooperation launched an official "Food Diplomacy 2021–2023" campaign as part of a larger economic diplomacy strategy. At the launch Minister of Foreign Affairs and International Cooperation Prak Sokhonn listed prahok, fish amok, pomelo salad, samlor kako, samlor ktis, prahok ktis and num banhchok as some of the Khmer dishes to be promoted in the campaign. The ministry also established a program to train Cambodian cooks for serving in Cambodian embassies and a program for providing ambassador spouses with knowledge about the Khmer cuisine.

In February 2021, the ministry published a cookbook "The Taste of Angkor" as a culinary promotion tool for Cambodian diplomatic missions abroad. A 1960 Cambodian cookbook and culinary guide "The Culinary Art of Cambodia" by Princess Norodom Rasmi Sobbhana republished in May 2021 by Angkor Database was also included in the campaign. In June 2021, a series of promotional videos under the slogan "Taste Cambodia" featuring Khmer foods and culinary activities in different Cambodian regions commissioned by the Ministry of Tourism of Cambodia were released. In May 2022, culinary training and representation facilities under the name of "Angkor Kitchen" were unveiled at the Ministry of Foreign Affairs and International Cooperation.

=== China ===
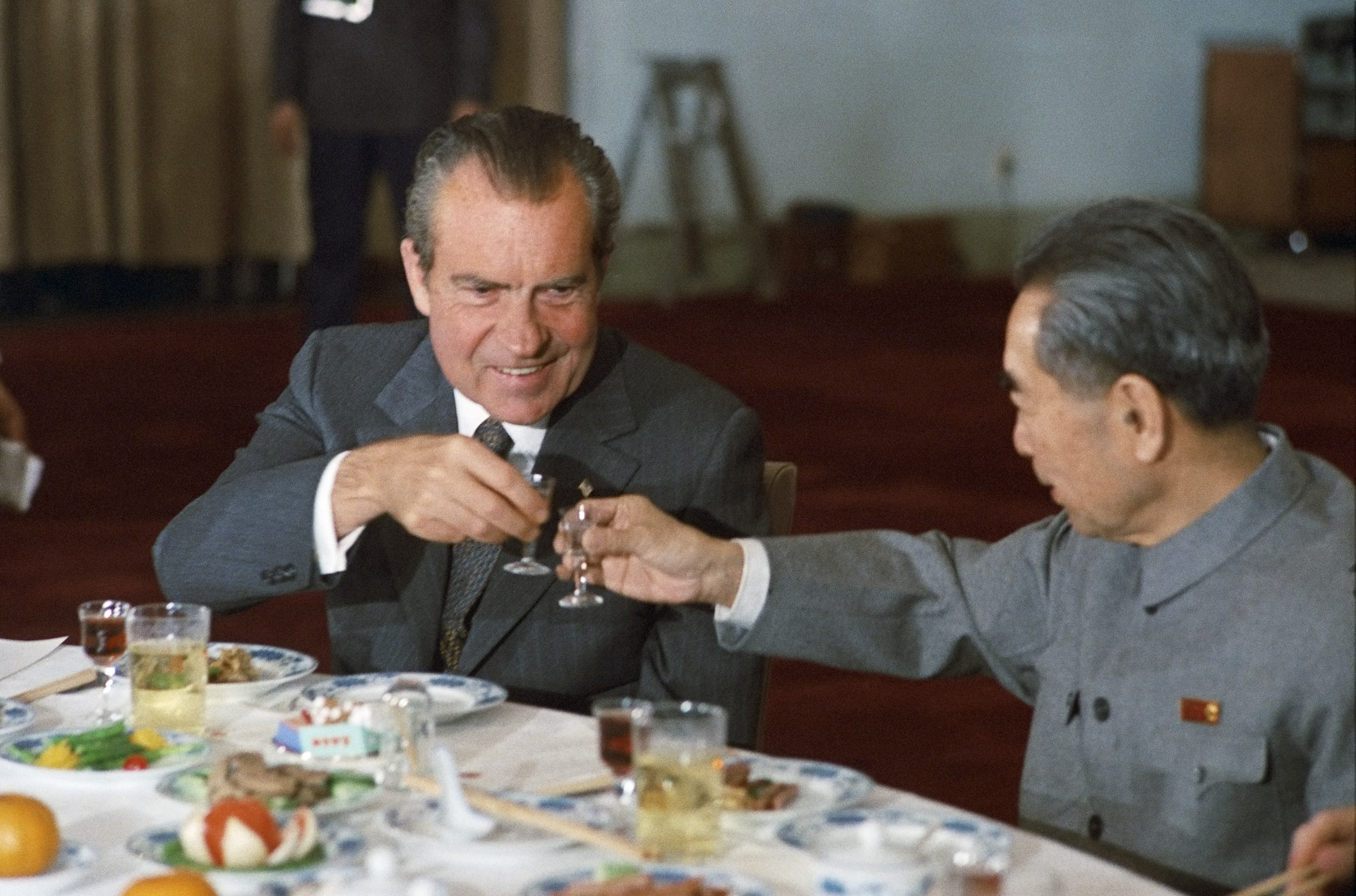
Richard Nixon and Zhou Enlai toasting at a banquet during Nixon's 1972 visit to China.

The 1972 banquets at the Great Hall of the People on the occasion of the visit of Richard Nixon to the People's Republic of China have been described as "a signal moment of gastrodiplomacy" and gastronationalism and as "culinary and diplomatic performances writ large" by food historian Michelle T. King. King notes the success of the strategy; The New York Times published recipes to help readers recreate the banquet dishes that had been seen on television. King also notes the irony in the fact one of the dishes the Times published was adapted from a cookbook by Fu Pei-mei, Taiwan's most famous chef.

=== India ===
Whilst Indian cuisine is already popular in many countries around the world, the Indian government has been working to popularise millets, a staple ingredient used in Indian cooking.

=== Indonesia ===
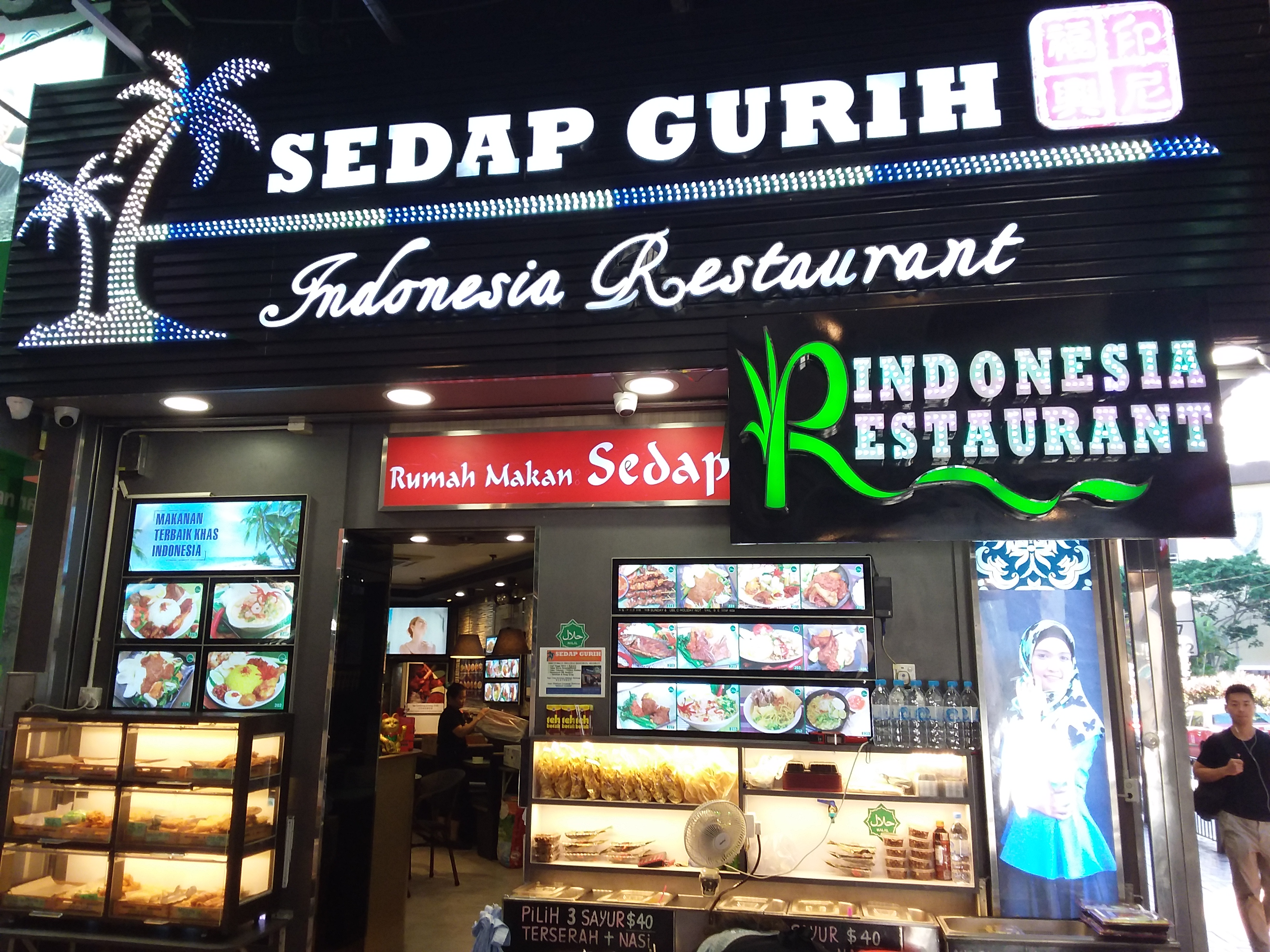
An Indonesian restaurant in Hong Kong.

Indonesian cuisine has traditionally enjoyed popularity in neighbouring countries; e.g. Malaysia, Singapore and Australia, as well as nations that shares historical ties with Indonesia; such as the Netherlands, Suriname, and South Africa. It is also increasingly popular in Japan and Korea. In 2021, the Indonesian government launched the "Indonesia Spice Up The World" program as a coordinated culinary diplomacy campaign. The programme was intended to promote Indonesian cuisine abroad, to assist Indonesian culinary industry; by helping the local spice products and processed food to find their ways into the global market, and also to assist Indonesian restaurants abroad.

The "Indonesia Spice Up The World" program involves government's inter-ministerial institutions, Indonesian food industry, and also the public. The objective of the program is to boost the export value of Indonesian spices and herbs to US$2 billion, and increasing the presence of four thousand Indonesian restaurants abroad by 2024.

=== Israel ===
In an article in the Israel Journal for Foreign Affairs, Ambassador Avi Millo described how, during his posting (1996-2001), he hosted many dignitaries including the then prime minister, Professor Radu Vasile, at his residence in Bucharest. He served traditional Jewish cuisine to his guests and used it to teach them about Israeli culture, and to develop a cordial relationship with them. These meals, he stressed, facilitated conversation, trust, and eventual cooperation between himself and his interlocutors. "In Kashrut [Jewish dietary laws]," he maintained that "Israel has an important and hitherto untapped diplomatic resource. It would behoove Israeli ambassadors serving abroad to make use of it." On January 25, 2023, The Israel Council of Foreign Relations held an event at the Battae Ethiopian Israeli Heritage Center to celebrate Ethiopian–Israeli culture through food.

=== Japan ===
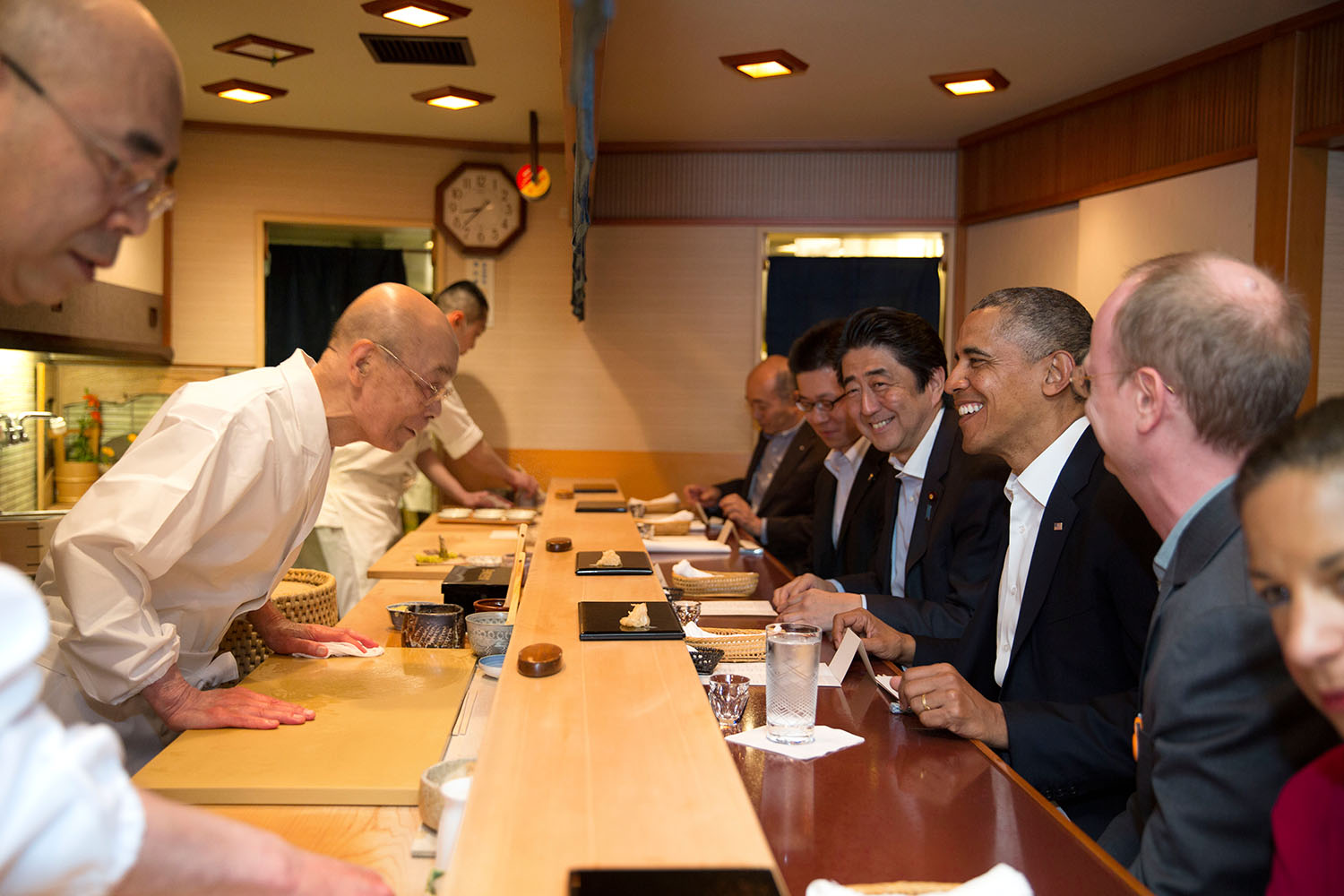
U.S. President Barack Obama and Japanese Prime Minister Shinzo Abe at the Sukiyabashi Jiro sushi restaurant in Tokyo in 2014.

The Japan Brand Working Group was established in 2005 and would go on to house the country's culinary diplomacy initiative, the Food Research Promotion Discussion Group (Shoku-bunka kenkyū suishin kondankai). The Japanese Restaurants Overseas (JRO) was subsequently created as a non-profit organization that invests in and helps grow restaurants offering Japanese cuisine.

In 2006, the Japanese Ministry of Agriculture, Forestry, and Fisheries launched "Washoku-Try Japan's Good Food," a campaign, presenting Japanese dishes at special events held by Japanese diplomatic missions abroad. The MAFF also established the Award for Overseas Promotion of Japanese Food along with the Executive committee for the Export Strategy and Export Expansion Policy. This policy promotes seven categories of food: seafood products, rice and rice-made processed foods, forest products, flowering trees (bonsai), vegetables, beef meat and tea.

In 2010, Japan's ministry of Japan's Ministry of Economy, Trade and Industry (METI) published the report, "Towards Nation Building through Cultural Industries," in which methods for promoting Japanese cuisine and utilizing "soft power" for national cultural industry were emphasized. The report also highlighted the importance of exporting agricultural crops, processed foods, and tableware together in the marketing of Japanese cuisine, in order to carry with it elements of Japanese "authentic culture". In December 2013, the United Nations Educational, Scientific and Cultural Organization (UNESCO) inscribed Washoku into the Representative List of the Intangible Heritage of Humanity.

In April 2017, the Japan Food Products Overseas Promotion Center (JFOODO) was created by the Japan External Trade Organization (JETRO), with a focus on overseas markets in promoting the Japanese agricultural, forestry, and fishery products. Japanese government efforts to the promotion of washoku globally illustrates their overall commitment to gastrodiplomacy to provide a positive image of Japan.

On July 17, 2018, Japan and the European Union signed an Economic Partnership Agreement (EPA) working towards the liberalization of the agri-food market. The EPA is the biggest trade agreement ever negotiated by the EU and contains a number of provisions that will simplify trade and investment procedures and reduce export and investment related costs.

=== Malaysia ===
In 2006, Malaysia launched the "Malaysia Kitchen Programme" to promote the country as a Halal hub for Muslims. Beginning in 2010, the Malaysia External Trade Development Corporation carried out Malaysia Kitchen for the World program to showcase Malaysian food with focus on five markets: Australia, China, New Zealand, the United Kingdom, and the United States. The approach, which has employed celebrity chefs such as Rick Stein and Norman Musa in the UK, has had significant impact in increasing awareness of Malaysian–themed restaurants through product promotions and cooking demonstrations at supermarkets, food festivals and an annual night market at Trafalgar Square, London.

=== Peru ===
The Peruvian government promoted its cuisine in 2006 with "Perú Mucho Gusto", a tourism campaign that also funded national cookbooks, food festivals, and Peruvian restaurants worldwide.

An official Peruvian culinary diplomacy program started in 2011, with Peru's application for its cuisine to be included in UNESCO's list of intangible cultural heritage, the first year food heritage was recognized. Peruvian cuisine was denied the status of food heritage in its initial application. The Cocina Peruana Para El Mundo campaign has also been promoted by Peruvian chef Gaston Acurio, the owner of multiple restaurants worldwide as well as a co-creator of the documentary Perú Sabe, along with Spanish chef Ferran Adrià.

The Peruvian gastronomy is promoted by its proponents as a byproduct of Peru's multicultural national identity and what anthropologist Raúl Matta defines as the "three values embedded in Latin American neoliberal societies: cultural diversity promotion, entrepreneurship and competitiveness." Through the strategic use of media and culinary champions, Peru has attained greater prestige for its cuisine among international food communities, which is evidenced by the country winning the World's Leading Culinary Destination award every year from 2012 to 2019. Further examples of Peru's successful use of food to influence foreign publics include the strategic opening of Peruvian restaurants in Santiago, Chile by Peruvian nationals to facilitate immigration and the economic benefits received by the Nikkei community in Lima, Peru as a result of Peru's promotion of Nikkei cuisine on the international stage.

=== Singapore ===
In recent years, Singapore launched a culinary diplomacy initiative through its embassies located in various countries around the world, to promote Singaporean cuisine.

In June 2021, South Korean convenience store chain CU announced that it has begun selling the Singaporean dish Kaya toast at all of their stores as part of their "Singapore Gourmet Trip series" in collaboration with the Singapore Tourism Board (STB).

In October 2021, Singapore's ambassador to Japan, Peter Tan, invited local organizations to the embassy residence to eat Singaporean dishes, such as Katong laksa, as a form of food diplomacy. As part of a collaboration with Japanese supermarket Seijo Ishii, such recipes became available at a limited-time "Singapore Fair".

=== South Korea ===
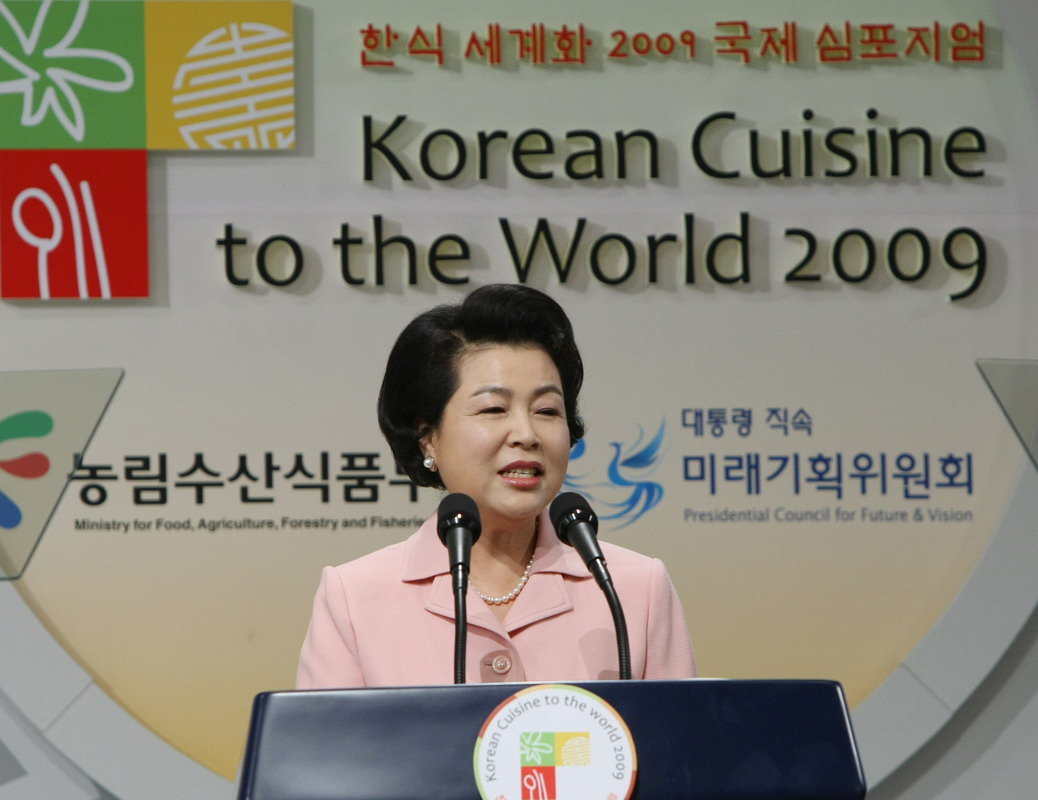
First Lady of the Republic of Korea Kim Yoon-ok giving a speech at the "Korean Cuisine to the World" symposium in 2009.

In 2009, South Korea launched a $77-million culinary diplomacy program entitled "Korean Cuisine to the World" or "Global Hansik". The program, nicknamed "Kimchi Diplomacy" internationally, was run by the Ministry of Food, Agriculture, Forestry and Fisheries. Its goals were to promote the unique nature and health qualities of Korean cuisine (hansik), make it one of the top five favorites internationally, and increase the number of Korean restaurants worldwide to 40,000 by 2017.

Projects undertaken by the Korean government include the opening of the World Institute of Kimchi, working to establish Korean cuisine as a course in internationally recognized cooking schools, and the launch of a touring Korean food truck. In the United States, the South Korean government funded the Bimbimbap Backpackers campaign and promoted Korean-Mexican fusion food, starting with the city of Los Angeles before gaining popularity nationwide. In the 2010s, South Korea began pivoting into Muslim markets by giving greater attention to how its food industry can meet Halal requirements.

=== Switzerland ===
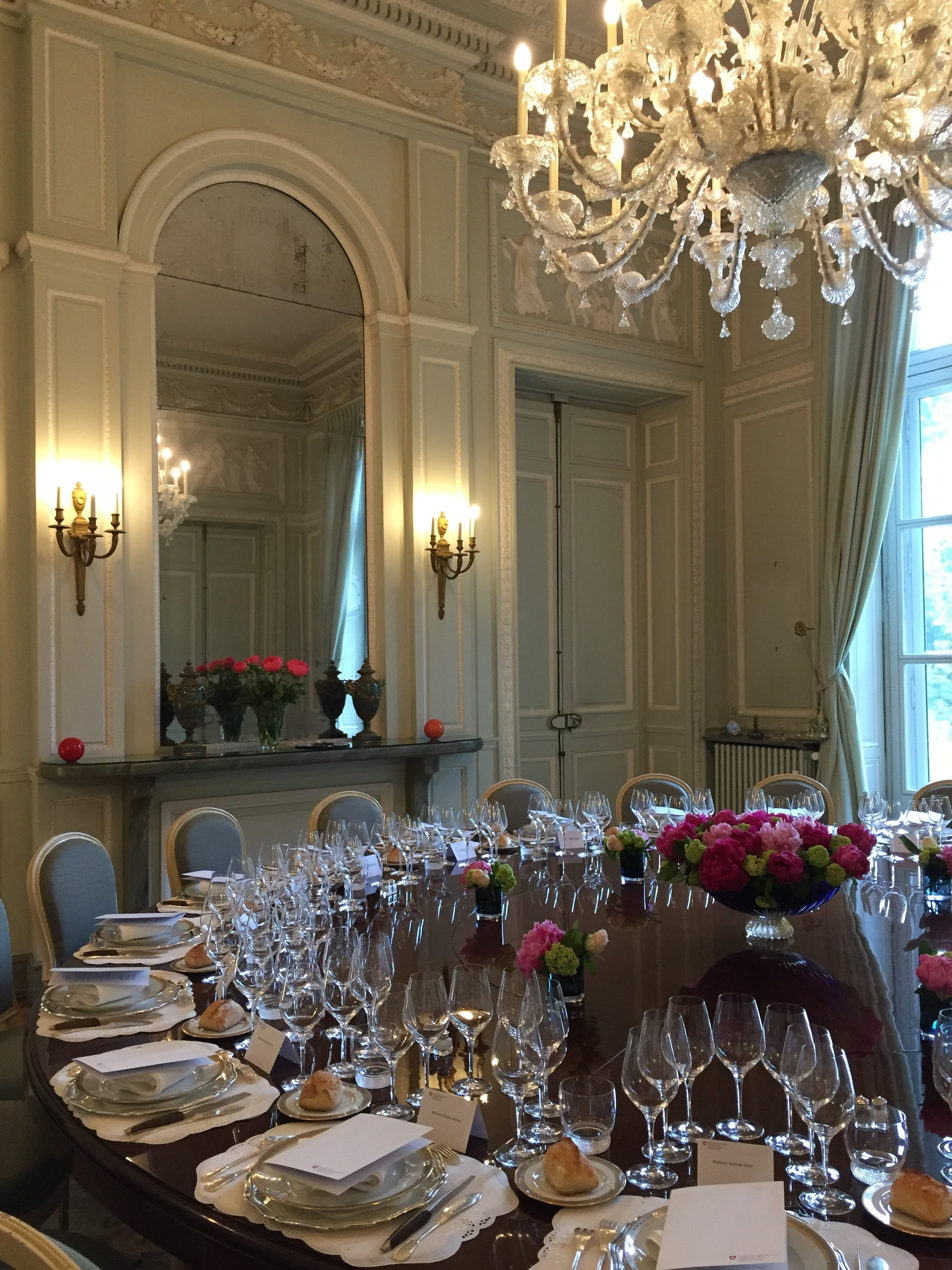
15 May 2018: The table is set for the first dinner under the motto Les Grandes Tables de Suisse – Ambassades gourmandes. The dining room at the Hôtel de Besenval, built in 1782 by Alexandre-Théodore Brongniart for Pierre Victor, Baron de Besenval de Brunstatt, is considered one of the first ever purpose-built dining rooms. Like his contemporary Charles Maurice de Talleyrand-Périgord, Prince de Benevento et de Talleyrand, the baron believed that the way to successful diplomacy is through the stomach. Famously, Charles Maurice de Talleyrand-Périgord is reputed to have told Napoléon: « Sire, j'ai plus besoin de cuisiniers que de diplomates ! »

Swiss cuisine is traditionally made up of variations on dishes from its neighboring countries France, Italy, Germany and Austria, with influences from France and Italy dominating. Some of the most famous Swiss dishes that are considered Swiss signature dishes are: Rösti, Raclette, Fondue, Cordon Bleu, St. Galler Bratwurst, Capuns and Pizzoccheri. As part of the public diplomacy strategy, the Federal Department of Foreign Affairs – in collaboration with top Swiss chefs – put Switzerland's culinary heritage at the service of diplomacy.

==== Les Grandes Tables de Suisse – Ambassades gourmandes ====
On 15 May 2018, the first dinner under the motto Les Grandes Tables de Suisse – Ambassades gourmandes was held at the Hôtel de Besenval, the Embassy of the Swiss Confederation in Paris. The host of the evening was Bernardino Regazzoni (* 1957), Ambassador of Switzerland to France. Senators, deputies, diplomats, nobles, members of the Academy of Moral and Political Sciences, as well as socialites from France and Switzerland were seated under the large Murano chandelier in the dining room for this dinner. A dinner that would become the start of many such dinners around the world.

==== Les Grands Chefs des Grandes Tables de Suisse at the Baron de Besenval's table ====
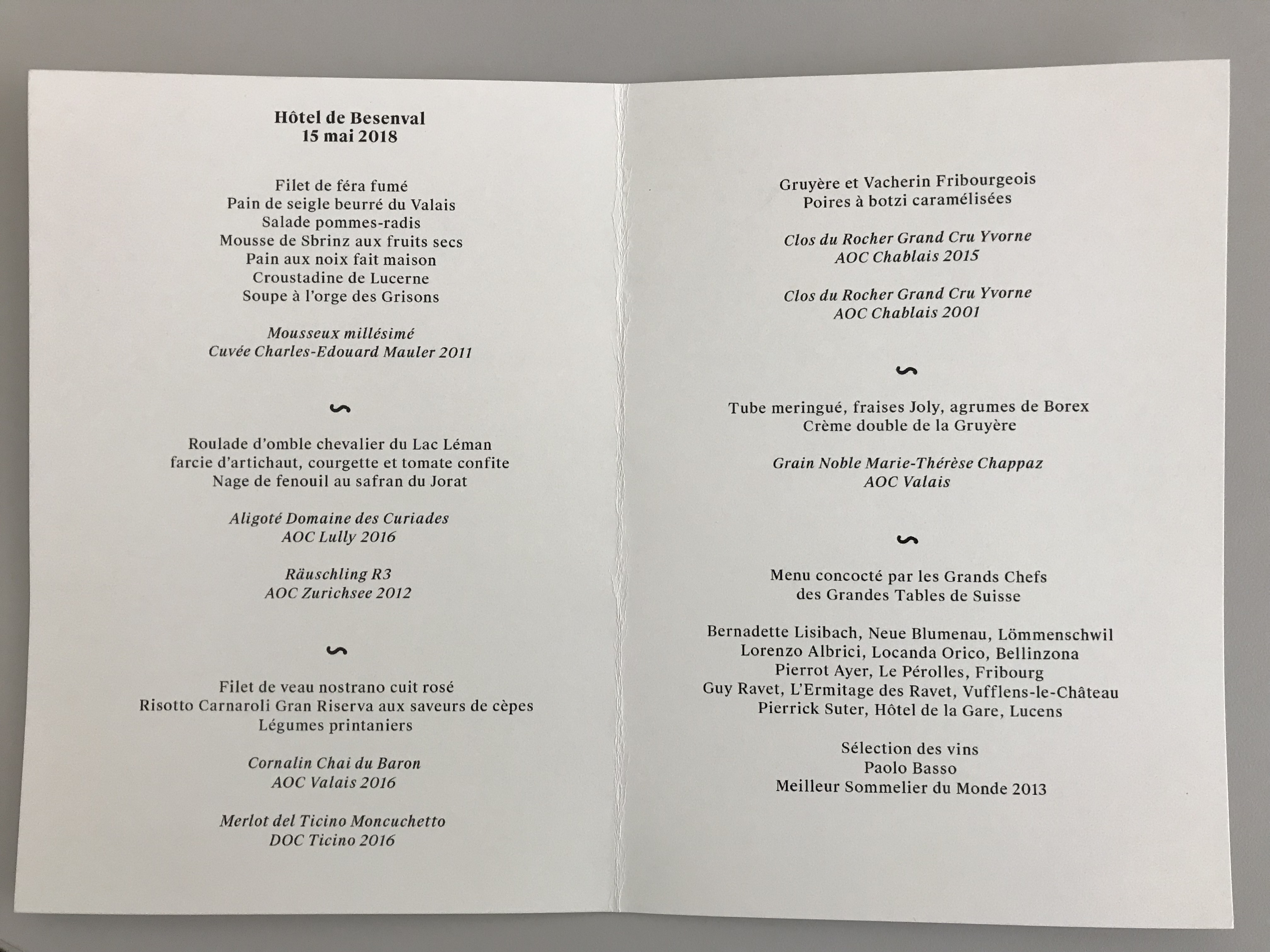
15 May 2018: The menu of the first dinner under the motto Les Grandes Tables de Suisse – Ambassades gourmandes at the Hôtel de Besenval.

It was no coincidence that the first such event was held in France. On the one hand, France is considered the country of gourmets par excellence. On the other hand, with the Hôtel de Besenval the Swiss Confederation owns a building whose former owner, Pierre Victor, Baron de Besenval de Brunstatt, a Swiss military officer in French service, served as a pioneer of what is now referred to as gastrodiplomacy.

It was in 1782, when the architect Alexandre-Théodore Brongniart transformed the baron's Grand cabinet at the Hôtel de Besenval into what was then a novelty: A dining room.

"It has always been said that gastronomy serves diplomacy. But diplomacy must also serve gastronomy."

— Ambassador Nicolas Bideau, Director of Presence Switzerland (2011–2024)

=== Taiwan ===
In 2010, Taiwan's Ministry of Economic Affairs launched a £20-million culinary diplomacy campaign called "All in Good Taste: Savor the Flavors of Taiwan". It promoted Taiwanese venues internationally, sponsored chefs, hosted food festivals and competitions, and emphasized elements such as bubble tea, oyster omelette, and Taiwan's night markets. Taiwan has used its culinary programs to bolster its tourism sector and to conduct diplomacy in countries with which it has limited official ties.

=== Thailand ===
The "Global Thai" program, launched in 2002, was a government-led culinary diplomacy initiative. It aimed to boost the number of Thai restaurants worldwide to 8,000 by 2003 from about 5,500 previously. By 2011, that number had increased to more than 10,000 Thai restaurants worldwide.

The program was explained in Thailand: Kitchen of the World, an eBook published to promote the program. The point of the e-book: "In the view of the Export Promotion Department, Thai restaurants have a good business potential that can be developed to maintain a high level of international recognition. To achieve that goal, the department is carrying out a public relations campaign to build up a good image of the country through Thai restaurants worldwide."

The Department of Export Promotion of the Thai Ministry of Commerce offers potential restaurateurs plans for three different "master restaurant" types—from fast food to elegant—which investors can choose as a prefabricated restaurant plan. Accordingly, the Export-Import Bank of Thailand offered loans to Thai nationals aiming to open restaurants abroad, and the Small and Medium Enterprise Development Bank of Thailand set up an infrastructure for loans of up to US$3 million for overseas food industry initiatives, including Thai restaurants.

=== United States ===
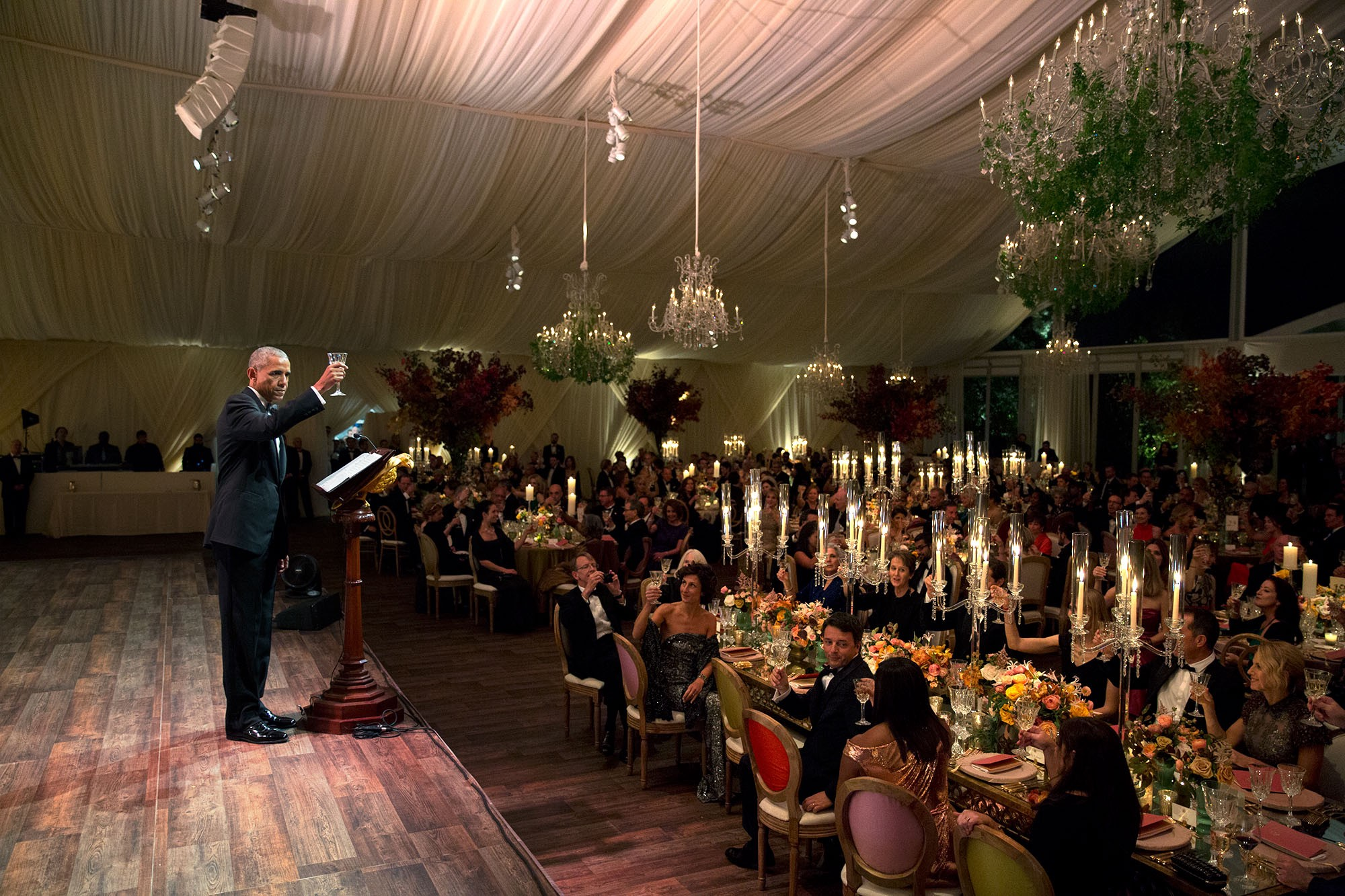
U.S. President Barack Obama giving a toast during a U.S. state dinner in honor of the visiting Italian Prime Minister Matteo Renzi in 2016.

In September 2012, the United States officially launched its Culinary Diplomacy Partnership Initiative. More than 80 chefs, including White House Executive Chef Cristeta Comerford, former White House Executive Pastry Chef William Yosses, and Spanish-born chef José Andrés, were named to be members of the "American Chef Corps". The initiative is organized by the United States State Department Office of Protocol. One goal of the program is to send members of the Chef Corps to American embassies abroad on public diplomacy missions to teach about American cuisine.

==== Selected List of American Chef Corps ====
- José Andrés, executive chef and owner of minibar, Jaleo, Oyamel, Zaytinia, China Poblano, é, Micasa, and America Eats Tavern
- Dan Barber, executive chef and co-owner of Blue Hill Restaurant and Blue Hill at Stone Barns
- Rick Bayless, owner of Frontera Grill and star of PBS series Mexico: One Plate at a Time
- April Bloomfield, Chef at The Spotted Pig and The Breslin, and owner of two Michelin stars
- Cristeta Comerford, White House Executive Chef
- Duff Goldman, Executive chef of Baltimore-based Charm City Cakes
- Roland Mesnier, former White House Executive Pastry Chef
- Marcus Samuelsson, Chef and owner of Red Rooster in Harlem, New York City
- Walter Scheib, former White House Executive Chef
- Ming Tsai, Chef at Blue Ginger and television personality
- Bill Yosses, former White House Executive Pastry Chef

== The Club des Chefs des Chefs ==
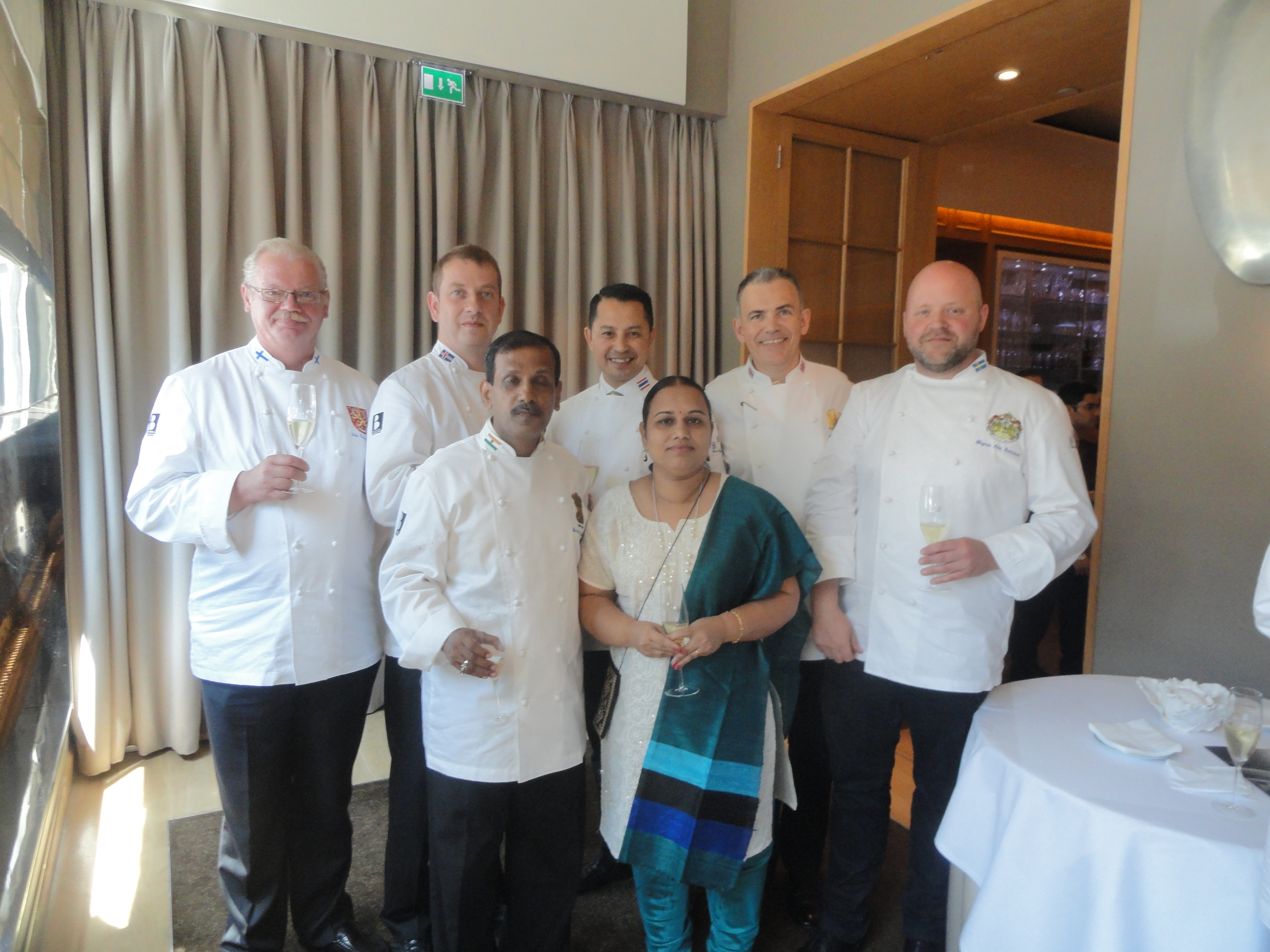
The Club des Chefs des Chefs annual meeting in London (2014).

At the summit of culinary diplomacy is Le Club des Chefs des Chefs, or the Leaders' Chefs' Club. Created in 1977 by Gilles Bragard, former CEO of Bragard Uniforms, the club annually brings together more than 25 chefs of heads of state to meet and discuss their work. Current club members include Executive Chef Cristeta Comerford from The White House, Chef Bernard Vaussion, formerly of the Élysée Palace, Chef Mark Flanagan, Chef to Her Majesty the Queen of the United Kingdom, and Chef Machindra Kasture, Chef to the Indian President.

The 2013 meeting of the club was hosted by White House Chef Cristeta Comerford and took place in New York City and Washington, DC. The chefs met with United Nations Secretary-General Ban Ki-moon as well as United States President Barack Obama.

The 2014 meeting of the club was hosted by Buckingham Palace chef Mark Flanagan, where the group met Queen Elizabeth II.

The 2015 meeting of the club took place in Switzerland, at the Hotel Bellevue Palace, and Italy, where the club visited the Expo 2015 in Milan.

== See also ==
- New Nordic Cuisine
- World Institute of Kimchi
- Order of the Anti-Sober
