= Machindra Kasture =

Indian chef based in New Delhi (born 1962)

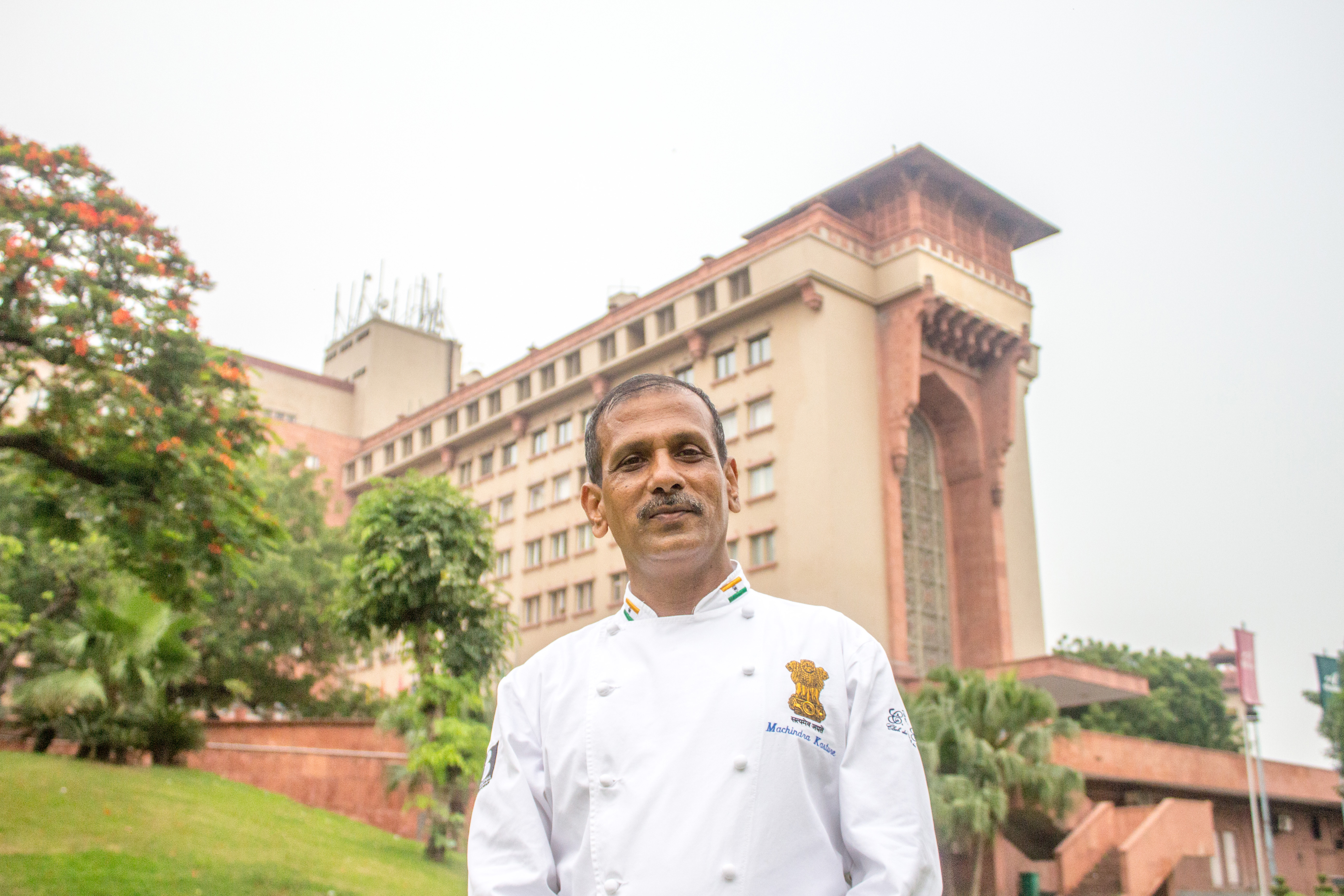
Chef Machindra Kasture at The Ashok Hotel in New Delhi 2016.

Machindra Kasture (born August 12, 1962) is an Indian chef based in New Delhi. He was the first chef for the President of India in the Rashtrapati Bhavan. He is the recipient of Nation Tourism award for the Best Chef of India in 2016.

Kasture started working in Rashtrapati Bhavan as Executive Chef in 2007 on deputation from ITDC. As chef to a head of state, he was a member of Le Club des Chefs des Chefs. As the member of Le Club des Chefs des Chefs and as the executive chef to the President of India, he represented India, when he went to the United States where he met President Barack Obama at the White House and United Nations Secretary General Ban Ki-moon at the UN headquarters in 2013 and Queen Elizabeth II at a private visit to Buckingham Palace in London 2014. Now he has been succeeded by Chef Montu Saini.

== Early life and education ==
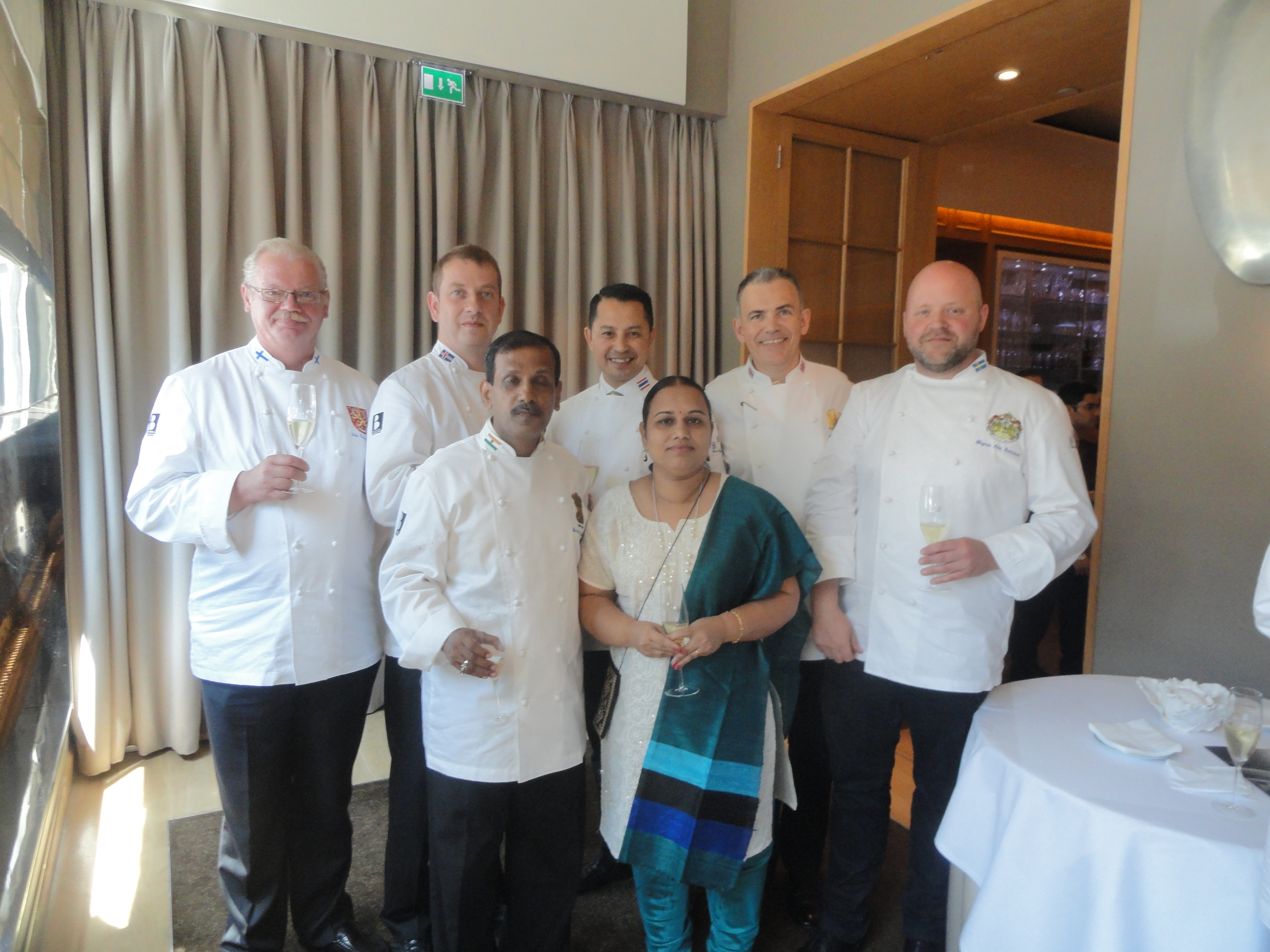
Chef Machindra Kasture with his wife Hemlata Kasture and Royal Chefs Mark Flanagan, Vice President of the C.C.C. accompagnies by Magnus Ake Rehbäck, the Chef of the King of Sweden in London 2014.

Kasture was born in Pune, Maharashtra. He did his Bachelor of Arts degree at Pune University and his Diploma in Hotel managementat Indian Institute of Hotel Management and Catering Technology, Mumbai in 1983.

He was inspired by his mother, who would often take him to vegetable and grocery shopping. Machindra Kasture is married to Hemlata Kasture who is a Marathi Newsreader in Aakashwani.

== Career ==
He started his hospitality journey with Centaur Hotel Juhu Beach Mumbai, Flight Kitchen Mumbai, Centaur Lake View Hotel, Srinagar, Royal Caribbean Cruise Line and Hotel Ashok I.T.D.C, New Delhi, Patna, Aurangabad.

In 2007, he received a call from Rashtrapati Bhavan. After passing various tests he joined the President's House as an Executive Chef. In his 8-year tenure in Rashtrapati Bhavan. He has served two president's Smt. Pratibha Patil and Sri Pranab Mukherjee.

He plans and executes menus for state banquets, high teas and luncheons at which the President of India hosts his counterparts and other VIPs from India and abroad. While he specializes in dishing out cuisines from around the world; he also has its own signature dishes, which includes Pineapple Halwa, Sitafal ka Halwa, Mutton Raan, Raisina Dal (whole urad dal), Achari paneer and Anjeer Kofta. Busiest days of the year are of state banquets and various ceremonies, including the swearing-in, award functions, etc. But the real challenge, he said, are on days such August 15 and January 26, when the President organises At Home, which is attended by around 1,500 people.

For eight years, Kasture has cooked for some of the highest dignitaries of the world including Pranab Mukherjee, Rahul Gandhi, Sonia Gandhi, Narendra Modi, Hamid Karzai, King Juan Carlos I of Spain and Barack Obama.

== Charity ==
As a member of Le Club des Chefs des Chefs Kasture has cooked for charity as a partnership between the InterContinental New York Barclay Hotel and the Saint Francis Xavier Mission in Chelsea invited the Le Club de Chefs de Chefs (the governing organization for chefs to Heads of States) to feed the hungry in New York City. 21 chefs in total cooked and served a menu with the theme "Fit for Royalty", designed around comfort food from the world's first families. Approximately 200 people from the community came out to fill up what was surely one of the better meals they've eaten at a soup kitchen in 2013.

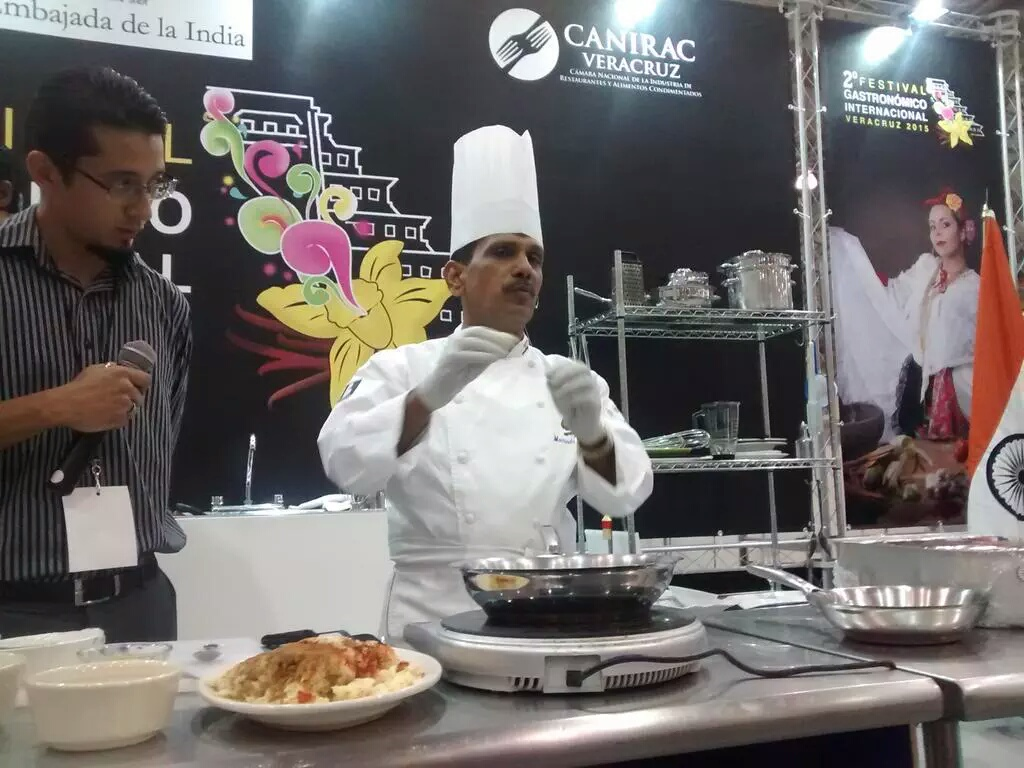
Chef Kasture at International Food Festival in Veracruz Mexico.

In 2015, he cooked at the site called Refectory Ambrosiano for Caritas Ambrosiana which is an association that collects the food which is not used in the restaurants of the EXPO Milano 2015 to feed homeless or poor people in a special refectory in Milan, Italy at Expo Milano 2015.

== Media and books ==
Machindra Kasture's recipes are part of The coffee table book "Around India's First Table: Dining and Entertaining at the Rashtrapati Bhavan" which is being put together by Lizzie Collingham of the University of Warwick, bestselling author of Curry: A Biography, and author of The Emperor's Table, Salma Hussain.

== Awards ==
National Tourism award for Best Chef of India in 2016.
