= Victoria-Jungfrau Collection =

Victoria-Jungfrau Collection AG
- Company type: Public
- Industry: Hospitality, Tourism
- Founded: 1865
- Headquarters: Interlaken (canton of Bern), Switzerland
- Products: Hotels, resorts
- Website: www.victoria-jungfrau-collection.ch

Victoria-Jungfrau Collection AG is a Swiss hotel chain founded in Interlaken, Switzerland, in 1865. It still has corporate offices in this city. The company currently operates four five-star hotels in Switzerland. Two of them are owned and managed by the company (Victoria-Jungfrau Grand Hotel & Spa, Eden au Lac), the two others are operated by the way of a management contract (Bellevue Palace, Palace Luzern).

Victoria-Jungfrau Grand Hotel & Spa, Hotel Bellevue Palace and Palace Luzern are members of The Leading Hotels of the World.

In 2011, the Victoria-Jungfrau Collection sold the Palace Luzern to CS Funds AG, a real estate fund of Credit Suisse. After Chinese investor Yunfeng Gao bought the hotel in December 2015, the Victoria-Jungfrau Collection initially continued to run the hotel until October 2017, when the hotel was closed for renovation.

== Hotels ==
=== Switzerland ===
- Victoria-Jungfrau Grand Hotel & Spa, Interlaken, Switzerland
- Hotel Bellevue Palace, Bern, Switzerland
- Palace Luzern, Luzern, Switzerland
- Eden au Lac, Zurich, Switzerland

== Gallery ==
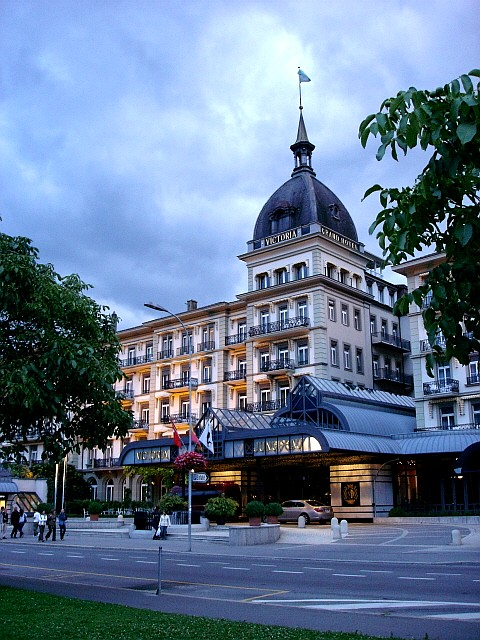
Victoria-Jungfrau Grand Hotel & Spa, Interlaken

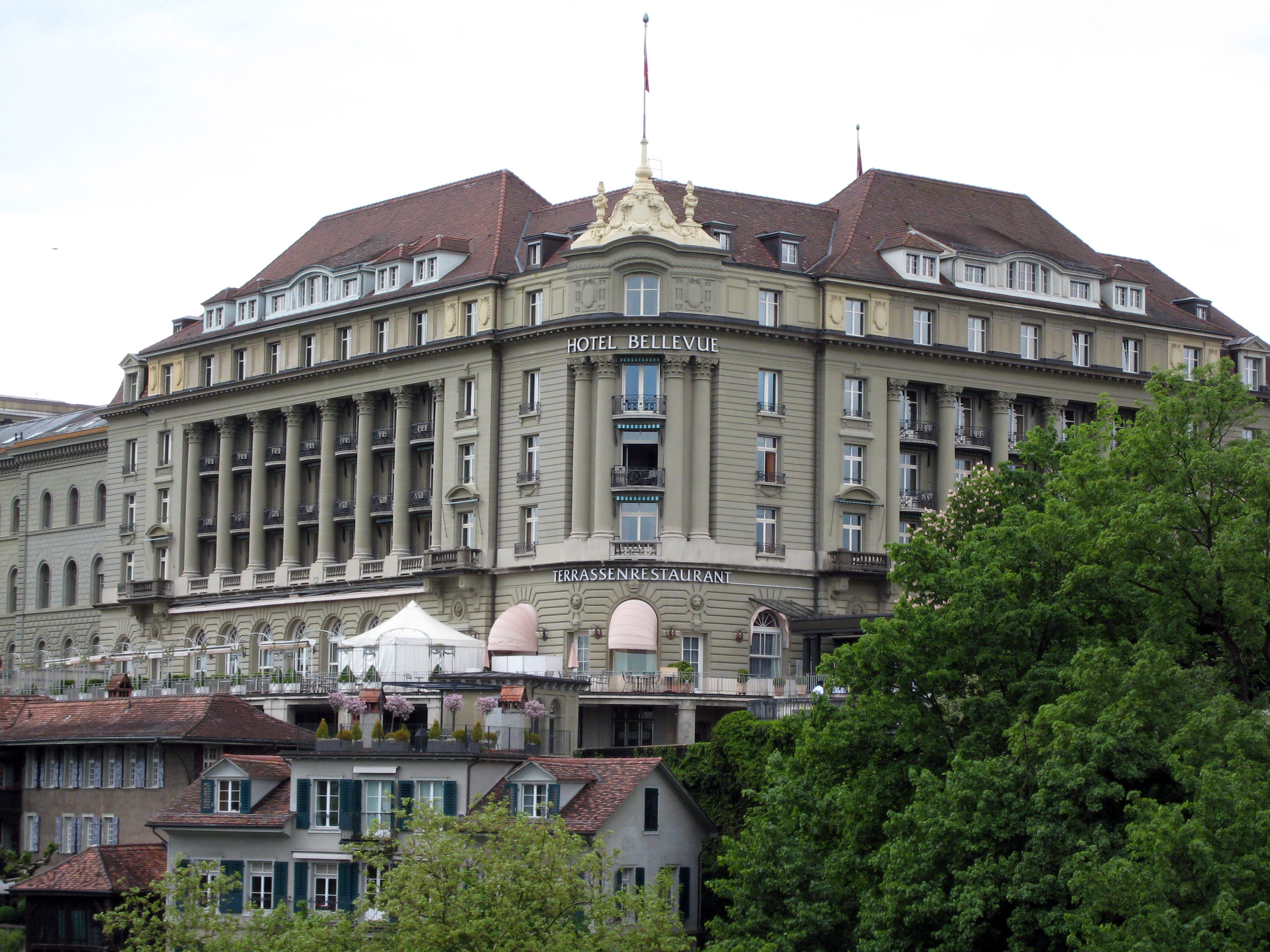
Hotel Bellevue Palace, Bern
