= Le Club des Chefs des Chefs =

International culinary organisation

Club des Chefs des Chefs
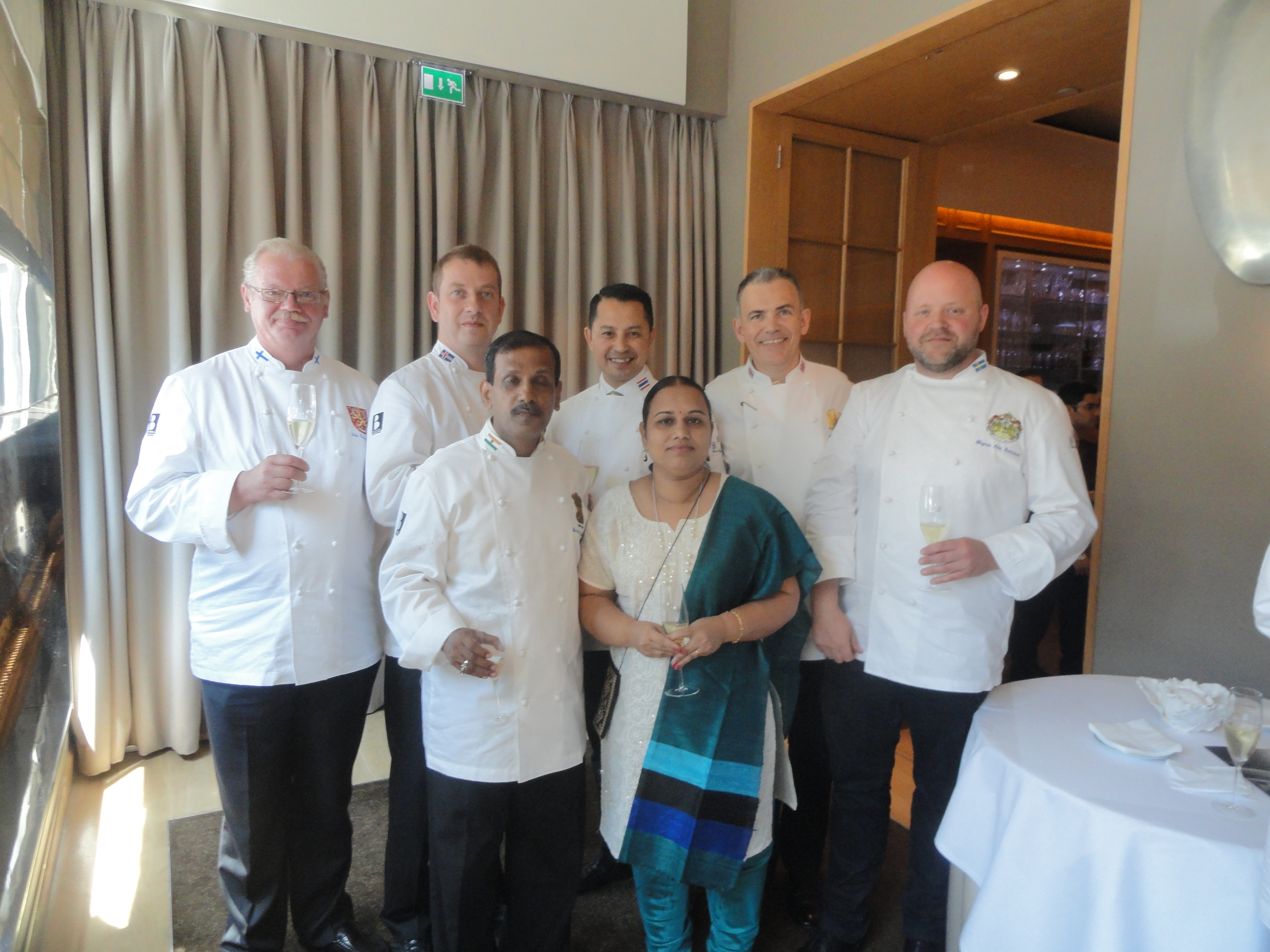
- The club's annual meeting in London (2014)
- Abbreviation: C.C.C.
- Formation: November 21, 1977; 48 years ago
- Founder: Gilles Bragard
- Headquarters: Paris, France
- Members: 29 (2023)
- Secretary General: Gilles Bragard
- President: Christian Garcia, Monaco
- Vice President: Mark Flanagan, United Kingdom
- Website: chefs-des-chefs.com

Le Club des Chefs des Chefs (C.C.C.) is an international culinary organisation of chefs to world leaders.

The main purposes of this official gathering are to promote the national kitchen, and act as diplomatic representatives. The chefs are in contact every day with their own heads of state or government and form a unique international network. Annually, the president brings together the chefs of heads of state to meet and discuss their work.

The name of the organization is a play on words because in French, "chef" can mean either "kitchen chef" or "boss". In English, the name can be translated as "the Club of Chefs to Heads of State."

== History ==
The Club was founded by Gilles Bragard in 1977 as an international culinary organisation of chefs to world leaders. Chef Garcia, head chef of the Prince of Monaco was elected in 2012 to become president. In 2013, the Club participated in UN Secretary-General Ban Ki-moon's Zero Hunger Challenge.

=== Annual meetings ===
The members annually gather on invitation of a member, and are received by the head of state.

- 1991: Bern, Switzerland
- 1999: New York City, United States
- 2006: Egypt
- 2011: Moscow and Saint Petersburg, Russia
- 2012: Berlin, Germany and Paris, France, in two locations for the 35th meeting
- 2013: Washington, D.C. and New York City, United States
- 2014: London, United Kingdom
- 2015: Bern and Geneva, Switzerland and Milan, Italy
- 2016: India
- 2017: Canada
- 2018: Marrakesh, Morocco
- 2019: Seoul, South Korea
- 2021: France
- 2022: Spain
- 2023: Washington, D.C., United States
- 2024: Italy
- 2025: Macao, Shenzhen and Bangkok (planned)

== Current members ==
President of the C.C.C.

- Monaco: Christian Garcia, head chef to Albert II, Prince of Monaco

Vice President of the C.C.C.

- United Kingdom: Mark Flanagan, Chef of the Monarch of the United Kingdom

Members

- Austria: Rupert Schnait, Chef to the President of Austria
- Canada: Alex Johnstone, Chef to the Prime Minister of Canada
- Denmark: Martin Kristoffersen, Chef of the Monarch of Denmark
- France: Guillaume Gomez, Head Chef at the Élysée
- Germany: Caroline Dembiany, Chef to the Chancellor of Germany
- India: Mukesh Kumar, Chef to the President of India
- Israel: Shalom Kadosh, Chef to the President of Israel
- Italy: Fabrizio Boca, Chef to the President of Italy
- Luxemburg: Franck Panier, Chef of the Grand Duke of Luxembourg
- Morocco: Rachid Agouray, Chef for receptions of the Kingdom of Morocco
- Peru: Gastón Acurio, Chef for receptions of Government Palace, Peru
- South Africa: Hilton Little, Chef to the President of South Africa
- Spain: José Roca, Chef to the Prime Minister of Spain
- Sweden: Magnus Åke Rehback, Chef of the Monarch of Sweden
- Switzerland: Gregor Zimmermann, Head Chef of the Hotel Bellevue Palace, the official guesthouse of the Swiss Confederation
- United States: Permsin Tommy Kurpradit, White House Executive Chef

== Former members (selection) ==
- France: Bernard Vaussion, chef at the Élysée from 1974 to 2013, Executive Chef from 2005 to 2013
- Germany: Ulrich Kerz, Chef to the Chancellor of Germany
- India: Montu Saini 2015–2020, Machindra Kasture, 2007–2015, Chefs to the President of India in the Rashtrapati Bhavan
- Russia: Jérôme Rigaud, former Chef of the Russian President
- United States: Henry Haller, White House Executive Chef from 1966 to 1987
