= Order of the Anti-Sober =

Diplomatic drinking event

Most illustrious and incomparable Order of the Anti-Sober; Très illustre et incomparable Ordre des Antisobres
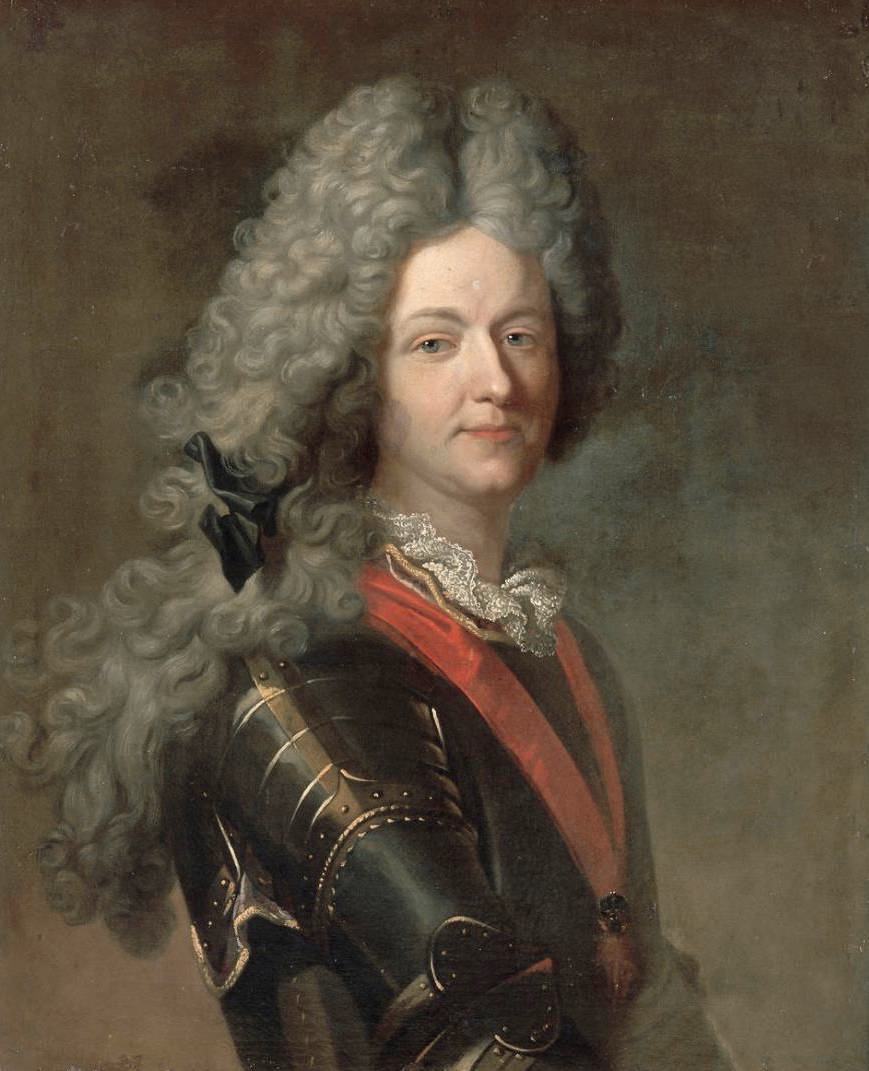
- A shrewd diplomat and self-promoter: James Francis Fitz-James Stuart. After his father's death in 1734, he inherited his titles in the Jacobite and Spanish nobility whereupon he became James Francis Fitz-James Stuart, 2nd Duke of Berwick, Liria and Xérica.

Awarded by The Grand Master
- Type: Drinking order in the service of diplomacy
- Established: 6 January 1728; 298 years ago
- Motto: Eternal antipathy towards the sect of teetotalers and all those who practice the vice of sobriety
- Eligibility: At the Grand Master's pleasure
- Criteria: Liberal without extravagance and able to mock without turning to malice
- Founder: James Francis Fitz-James Stuart
- Grand Masters: James Francis Fitz-James Stuart
- Protector: Gustav Freiherr von Mardefeld
- Grades: Knight (Chevalier)

The Order of the Anti-Sober (full name: Most illustrious and incomparable Order of the Anti-Sober, original French name: Très illustre et incomparable Ordre des Antisobres) is a drinking order in the service of diplomacy, which is, however, no longer active. The order was founded on 6 January 1728 in Saint Petersburg by James Francis Fitz-James Stuart, Spain's first permanent envoy to Russia.

The circumstances and the purpose of the founding of the Order of the Anti-Sober as well as its statutes reveal how diplomacy functioned at most courts of Europe at a time when international diplomacy with the system of permanently accredited envoys and ambassadors was still in its infancy.

== The way to successful diplomacy is through the stomach ==
The founding of the Order of the Anti-Sober can be seen, on the one hand, as a reflection of the Zeitgeist. It was fashionable at the time forming fraternal societies as well as drinking and smoking clubs. On the other hand, the order was a means to an end and served James Francis Fitz-James Stuart to achieve his diplomatic goals, because he correctly assessed the customs and traditions in tsarist Russia.

After a six-month journey, James Francis Fitz-James Stuart reached Saint Petersburg on 23 November 1727. But even before his departure for Russia, the future Spanish envoy said that he would rely entirely on the variety of his wines in his diplomatic endeavours.

"In that part of the world [Eastern Europe] all affairs are concluded on a bottle."

— Comment by James Francis Fitz-James Stuart to his uncle, James Francis Edward Stuart, in a letter of March 1727 on his diplomatic strategy for Russia, shortly before his departure for Saint Petersburg

The fact that a European diplomat like James Francis Fitz-James Stuart relied on the cultivation of drinking culture to achieve his goals was a clever move in the Russian Empire. Under the reformer and moderniser Tsar Peter the Great, drinking had become very popular. Excessive drinking bouts were considered a royal pleasure and occurred frequently. This tradition of heavy alcohol consumption also continued under Tsar Peter II. For foreign diplomats, the rule was: If you want to succeed at the tsar's court, you have to be able to hold your liquor.

=== Pioneers of gastrodiplomacy ===
While in Eastern Europe drinking culture was part of the business of diplomacy, in Western Europe it was primarily food culture, although, of course, drinking was part of it too. Two of the most illustrious personalities of their time who knew how to use the power of good food and drinks, now known as gastrodiplomacy, to achieve their diplomatic goals were Charles Maurice de Talleyrand-Périgord, Prince de Benevento et de Talleyrand, and Pierre Victor, Baron de Besenval de Brunstatt, usually just referred to as Baron de Besenval (the suffix Brunstatt refers to the former barony). The latter regularly entertained diplomats, politicians and even royalty in his Parisian residence, the Hôtel de Besenval. And Charles Maurice de Talleyrand-Périgord, famously, is reputed to have told Napoléon: « Sire, j'ai plus besoin de cuisiniers que de diplomates ! »

== Statutes of the Order of the Anti-Sober: An excerpt ==
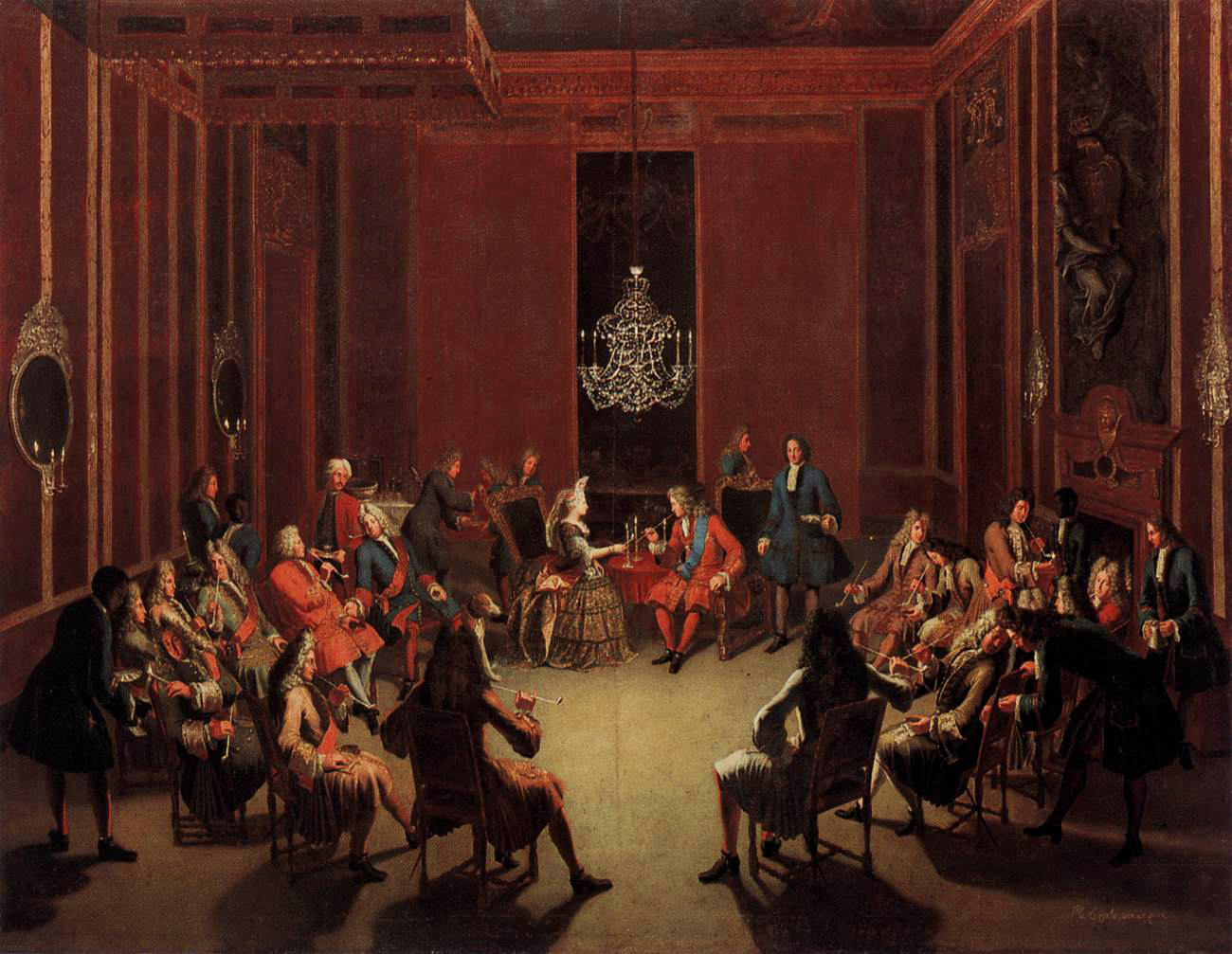
Meeting of the Tobacco College of King Frederick William I of Prussia. Like drinking orders or hunting societies, tobacco colleges were among the places where politics were made, and diplomatic decisions were taken. Accordingly, in addition to his sophistication, membership in such institutions and fraternities was crucial for a successful diplomat.

As the statutes show, the Order of the Anti-Sober was primarily intended as a place for pleasant socialising, undisturbed by any personal or political tensions. But such drinking orders also had a serious background in this early phase, when diplomacy was slowly beginning to professionalise. They were places where monarchs and ministers could exchange ideas free from any etiquette and commitments and informally explore possible alliances. The Order of the Anti-Sober was all about combining business with pleasure, and meeting like-minded people in a relaxed, informal atmosphere. The fact that the members of the order didn't take themselves entirely seriously is also reflected in the order's statues.

Article 3 of the statutes, for example, states that future members who did not meet the criteria for membership could still become members if they had a good cook and an excellent wine cellar. The statutes further stipulate:

- Members to leave all their ranks and titles at the door
- Members to create an atmosphere of informality and social equality
- Members to give short speeches (no longer than 2 minutes) to avoid the unpardonable crime of boredom
- Members to maintain strict secrecy about everything concerning the order and its members
- That during meals, no more than three dishes should be served, as profusion is the irreconcilable enemy of delicacy

Furthermore, the statutes require members to maintain sincere, close and cordial relations and to cultivate friendship without prejudice, prejudices such as those that may arise due to national or religious affiliation. It is in this spirit that even ceremonial toasts honouring emperors, kings, potentates or others are banned. Finally, the statutes connect the Order of the Anti-Sober with Russian culture by mentioning caviar alongside champagne and other favoured European wines. A gesture to the host country, intended to demonstrate the cross-border solidarity between nations – at least as far as food and drinks are concerned. In short: James Francis Fitz-James Stuart's Order of the Anti-Sober is all about the Good Life.

=== Penalties for violations of the order's statutes ===
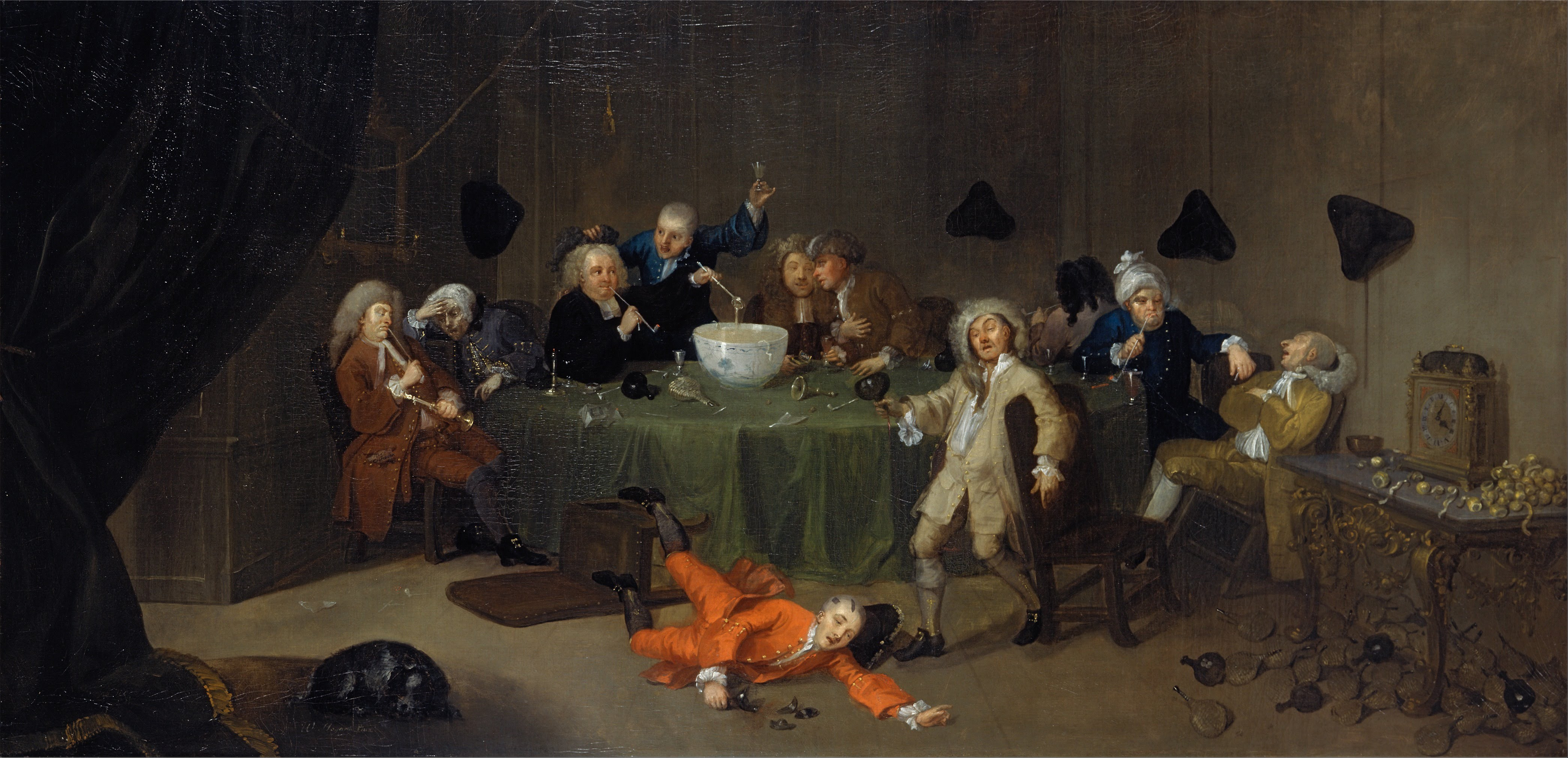
A traditional drinking bout, painted by William Hogarth in 1732.

The penalties for violations of the Order of the Anti-Sober's statutes – as some of the order's statutes themselves – are to be understood satirically: Those who violate the statutes of the order are condemned to travel 20 years in Russia without a bed and without a cook, in winter without a fur coat and in summer without ice.

=== Women are excluded ===
Women are excluded from membership in the Order of the Anti-Sober. This is justified by the need to curb the burning of certain inter-sexual desires, which contributes to the sweet harmony within the order.

== A successful diplomatic strategy ==
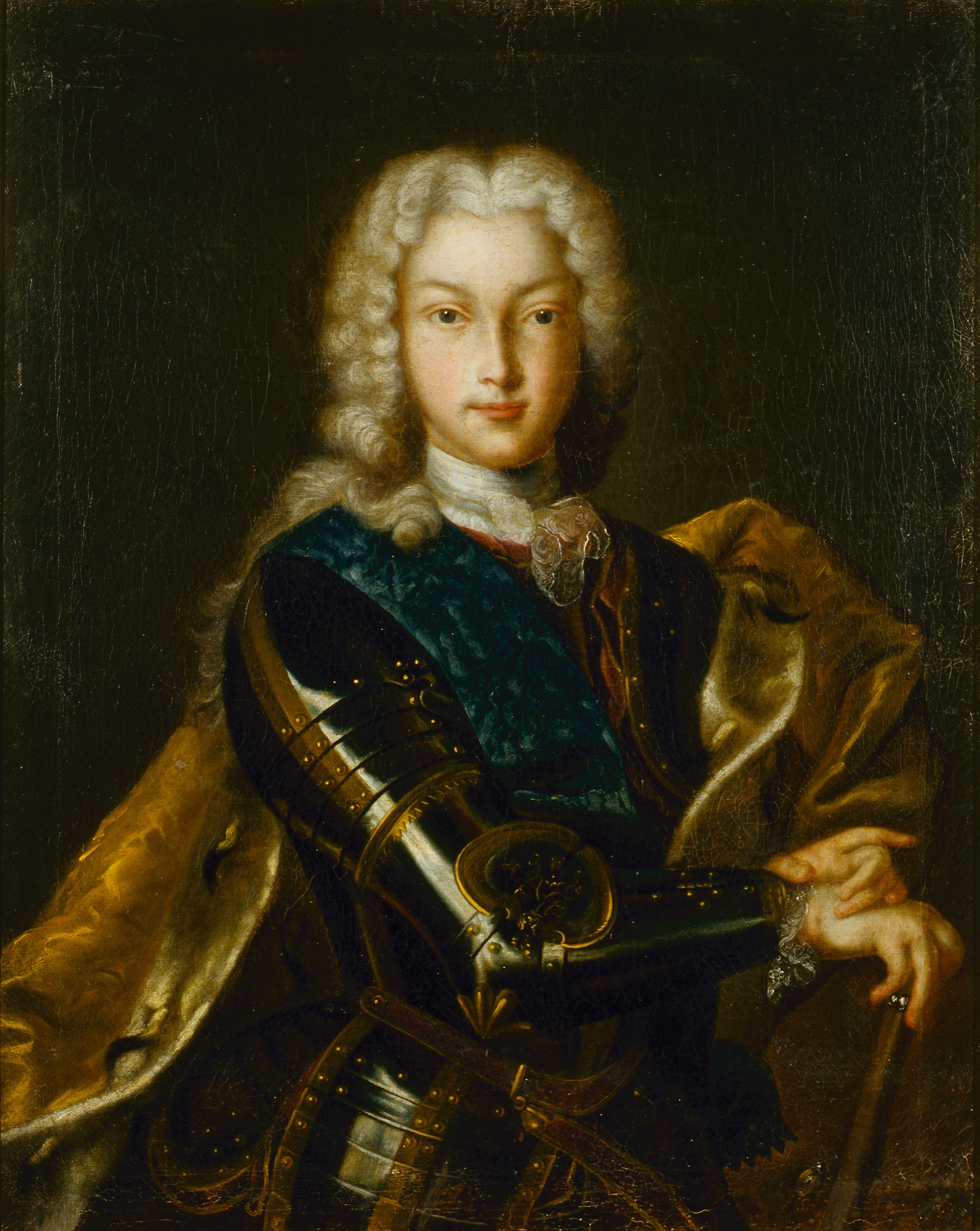
Tsar Peter II enjoyed James Francis Fitz-James Stuart's drinking diplomacy to the fullest, which paid off not only for the envoy himself but also for Spain.

James Francis Fitz-James Stuart's diplomatic strategy and his ability to drink paid off. After having organised several dinners followed by drinking parties for Tsar Peter II and his circle of friends, he was appointed a knight of the Order of St. Andrew in March 1728. From then on, all doors to Russian society were open to him. However, this did not mean that the era of drinking diplomacy was over. On the contrary. On 1 April Tsar Peter II again had dinner at James Francis Fitz-James Stuart's residence, accompanied by all the knights of the Order of St. Andrew and further dignitaries. James Francis Fitz-James Stuart reported that at this occasion 600 bottles of wine were consumed.

=== The climax of James Francis Fitz-James Stuart's drinking diplomacy ===
The climax of this drinking diplomacy, however, was a banquet given by James Francis Fitz-James Stuart on 27 July 1728, again for Tsar Peter II and his friends. The accounts for this, the largest of all of James Francis Fitz-James Stuart's parties, show the following alcohol consumption:

- 310 bottles of Tokaji
- 250 bottles of Champagne
- 170 bottles of Burgundy
- 220 bottles of Rheine wine
- 160 bottles of Mosel wine
- 12 barrels of generic French wines

This banquet cost James Francis Fitz-James Stuart 7,000 rubles. An enormous sum that roughly corresponded to the costs of maintaining the Tsar of Russia's court for a whole month.

== Legacy ==
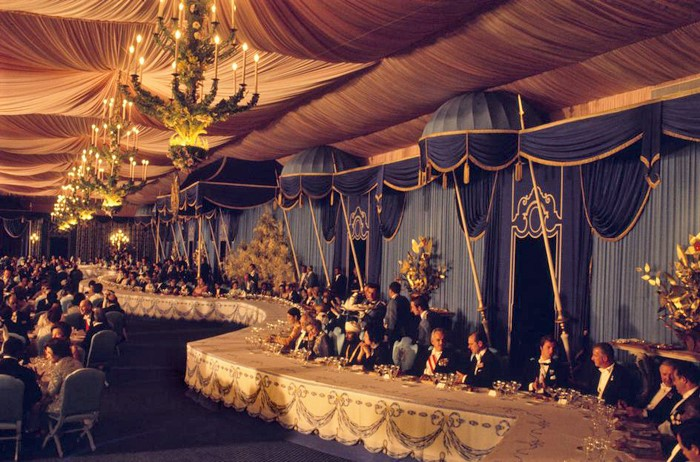
Gastrodiplomacy on a grand scale: In 1971, Mohammad Reza Shah Pahlavi hosted 600 guests, including many heads of state, in a tent city in Persepolis, celebrating 2,500 years of the Persian Empire. 25,000 bottles of wine from France (Champagne, Burgundy and Bordeaux), 12,000 bottles of whisky and several cases of cognac vintage 1860 were flown in. In response to the criticism that was voiced in the run-up to the expensive party, the Shah of Iran said: "What do you want me to do – serve the heads of state water, bread and radishes?" Some historians say that this extravagant party was the final straw that led to the Iranian Revolution.

The handwritten and dated but unsigned manuscript containing the statutes of the Order of the Anti-Sober, discovered in the diplomatic archives in France, is likely to be a copy of the lost original document. This copy was probably intended as a hand-out for potential members of the order. However, nothing has been recorded about possible members of the order, nor about specific further activities or the subsequent history of the Order of the Anti-Sober.

=== An informal forum for diplomats ===
The circumstances of the founding of the Order of the Anti-Sober illustrate the mechanisms of the process by which the various forms of fraternal association then in vogue were able to spread across borders and throughout Europe.

James Francis Fitz-James Stuart saw his Order of the Anti-Sober not only as a place where he could receive the tsar and his entourage to strengthen his influence at court and ultimately achieve his diplomatic goals. He also understood the order as an informal forum to promote relations between diplomats themselves by offering them the opportunity to converse away from the prying eyes of the tsar to whose court they were accredited.

==== Foundation for a future diplomatic community ====
With a view to the further development of the professionalisation of diplomacy, the Order of the Anti-Sober could be considered a step towards the emergence of a society of diplomats in the sense of an international diplomatic community, like the way in which fraternities in general contributed to the emergence of society.
