= Bernard Vaussion =

French chef (born 1953)

- Born: October 24, 1953 (age 73); France
- Occupation: Chef
- Employer: Élysée Palace
- Known for: Executive chef to the President of France (2005–2013)
- Culinary career
- Cooking style: French cuisine

Bernard Vaussion (French pronunciation: [bɛʁnaʁ vosjɔ̃]; born 24 October 1953) is a French chef. He served as the executive chef to the President of France until his retirement in 2013. Vaussion started as executive chef in 2005.

As chef to a head of state, Vaussion was a member of Le Club des Chefs des Chefs.

== Biography ==
According to Vaussion, his father was a steward and his mother a cook at a château in Sologne.

He began his career at age 14 working for a pastry chef. At age 16, he became a kitchen Embassy of the United Kingdom, Paris. He then joined the British embassy as sous chef.

After completing his Military service at the Élysée Palace under the command of chef Marcel Le Servot in 1974, he was officially hired on January 1, 1975. He recalls: "I started as a commis chef, then worked my way up through all the positions. After that, you settle in and stay for two, three, four years... A natural path emerges. You become demi-chef de partie, chef de partie, sous-chef. Then one day you say to yourself, ‘Why not chef?’" In 2005, he was promoted to head chef by Jacques Chirac. Regarding the unique challenge of serving distinguished guests, he states, “The important thing is to showcase local products, while also paying homage to the guests' culture.” Regarding his relationship with top chefs working in restaurants, he believes that “they represent an establishment and manage 80 to 100 people. I don't have the same responsibility. For a long time, I felt inferior to them. We weren't in the same league at all.”

He retired on October 30, 2013, after working at the presidency for forty years under presidents Georges Pompidou, Valéry Giscard d'Estaing, François Mitterrand, Jacques Chirac, Nicolas Sarkozy, and François Hollande. Michael Ellis, international director of Michelin guides, noted that “Bernard Vaussion held one of the most important positions in global gastronomy.”

He has since been honorary president of the Club des chefs des chefs, the association of chefs to heads of state. He is also president of a charitable organization, the French National Team of Gastronomy and Service Masters.
