= World Institute of Kimchi =

South Korean food R&D organization

- Established: 2010
- Mission: "Perform overall research and development related to kimchi, in order to lead national technological innovation and nurture and develop the kimchi industry that will boost the national growth"
- Focus: kimchi microbiology, fermentation science, food packaging and food culture
- Chair: Dr. Hae‐Choon Chang
- Staff: 25 research scientists, 9 administrative staff members, and 46 research technicians
- Location: 86 Gimchi-ro, Nam District, Gwangju, South Korea
- Website: wikim.re.kr

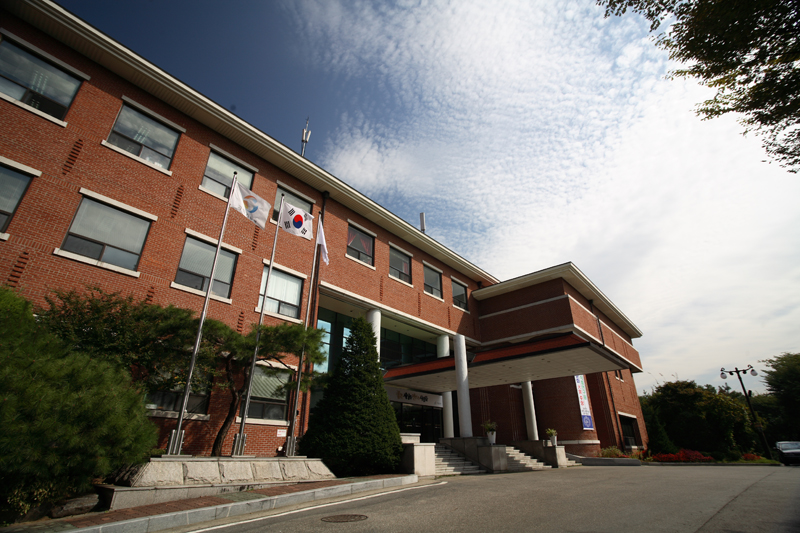
Entrance to the World Institute of Kimchi.

The World Institute of Kimchi (WiKim; Korean: 세계김치연구소) is an affiliate institution of Korea Food Research Institute established in 2010 that specializes in research and development related to kimchi. The institute is located at 86 Gimchi-ro, Nam District, Gwangju.

== History ==
On July 15, 2009, the location of the institute was selected in Imam-dong, Nam District, Gwangju. On September 17, 2009, The World Institute of Kimchi was formed within the Ministry of Food, Agriculture, Forestry and Fisheries. On December 23, 2009, The 132nd regular board meeting of the Industrial Technology Research Association approved the establishment of the World Kimchi Research Center affiliated with the Korea Food Research Institute. On January 1, 2010, The World Kimchi Research Institute was established and registered. On March 10, 2010, the opening ceremony of the World Kimchi Research Institute was held in the main auditorium of the Korea Food Research Institute.

On October 31, 2012, the institute's office building was moved to its current location. On March 23, 2013, The Ministry of Science, ICT and Future Planning changed the department in charge. Park Wan-soo who previously served as the acting-chairman was appointed the chairman of the World Institute of Kimchi. On July 26, 2017, the jurisdiction was placed under the Ministry of Science and ICT.

== Research field ==
Microbial functional research, new process fermentation research, cultural convergence research, industrial technology development, hygiene safety, and analysis research.

== Subdivisions ==
- R&D Headquarters
- Microbial Functional Research Center
- New Process Fermentation Research Center
- Cultural Convergence Research Center
- Industrial Technology Research Center
- Hygiene Safety Analysis Center
- Strategic Planning Division
- Planning and Budget Office
- Future Strategy Office
- Small and Medium Business Support Office
- Management Support Department
- HR and Finance Team
- Purchasing Computing Team
- Safety Facility Management Team
