= Montu Saini =

Indian chef based in New Delhi (born 1982)

Montu Saini (born 5 August 1982) is an Indian chef based in New Delhi. He was posted as Executive chef to the President of India in the Rashtrapati Bhavan from June, 2015 to July, 2020. He is the recipient of "Young Hotel Chef" Award 2014 from Federation of Hotel & Restaurant Association Of India and "Master Chef" Award 2014 from Indian Culinary Forum

Montu Saini was associated with Ashok Group of Hotel since 2005. He joined Ashok Group of Hotels as a Kitchen Management Trainee and became a Chef in 2007 promoting to Sous Chef in March 2014. Notably he is also the youngest member of the Club des Chefs des Chefs.

As a Presidents Secretariat headed the kitchen Brigade of family and state banquets. He has hosted banquets to some of the highest dignitaries of the world from countries like Tanzania, Republic of Mozambique, French Republic, Abu Dhabi, Myanmar, Republic of Egypt, Israel, Republic of Indonesia since his position as the executive chef to the president of India.

== Career ==
On 16 June 2015, he joined the President’s Secretariat as Executive Chef to the President of India, overseeing both the Family Kitchen as well as State Banquets.

He designed and oversaw menus for state banquets, high teas, and luncheons hosted by the President of India for visiting heads of state and other dignitaries from India and abroad. While he specialises in dishes from across the world, his signature creations include Subz Baoli Handi—slow-cooked vegetables in the dum style, using their own juices—and Murgh Darbari, a chicken curry inspired by nihari, prepared with roasted wheat and red chilli powder.

The busiest days of the year are of state banquets and various ceremonies, including the swearing-in, award functions, etc. But the real challenge, he said, are on days such as 15 August and 26 January, when the president organizes At Home, which is attended by around 1,500-2,500 people. The third India-Africa Forum Summit where he and his team served 54 Heads of States at One Table in November 2015 was one of the reputed events of his career. This was the biggest State Banquet ever conducted by the Palace. Recently ASEAN Heads of States from 10 neighboring countries were also served at one table.

== Media ==
Montu Saini, organized the general assembly of one of the world's most elite gatherings of culinary experts: Le Club des Chefs des Chefs (CCC). India hosted the annual assembly of CCC for the first time in 2016. The club was greeted & hosted by The then President of India Shri Pranab Mukherjee in the palace. Honorable Prime Minister Shri Narendra Modi also hosted a Hi-Tea on 25 October 2016, in Rashtrapati Bhavan, New Delhi, India.

He was the jury member of Spice Route culinary festival where chef from 15 nations gathered in Kochi in 2016 organized by Ministry of Tourism.
