= Hotel Bellevue Palace =

Hotel in Bern, Switzerland

Bellevue Palace
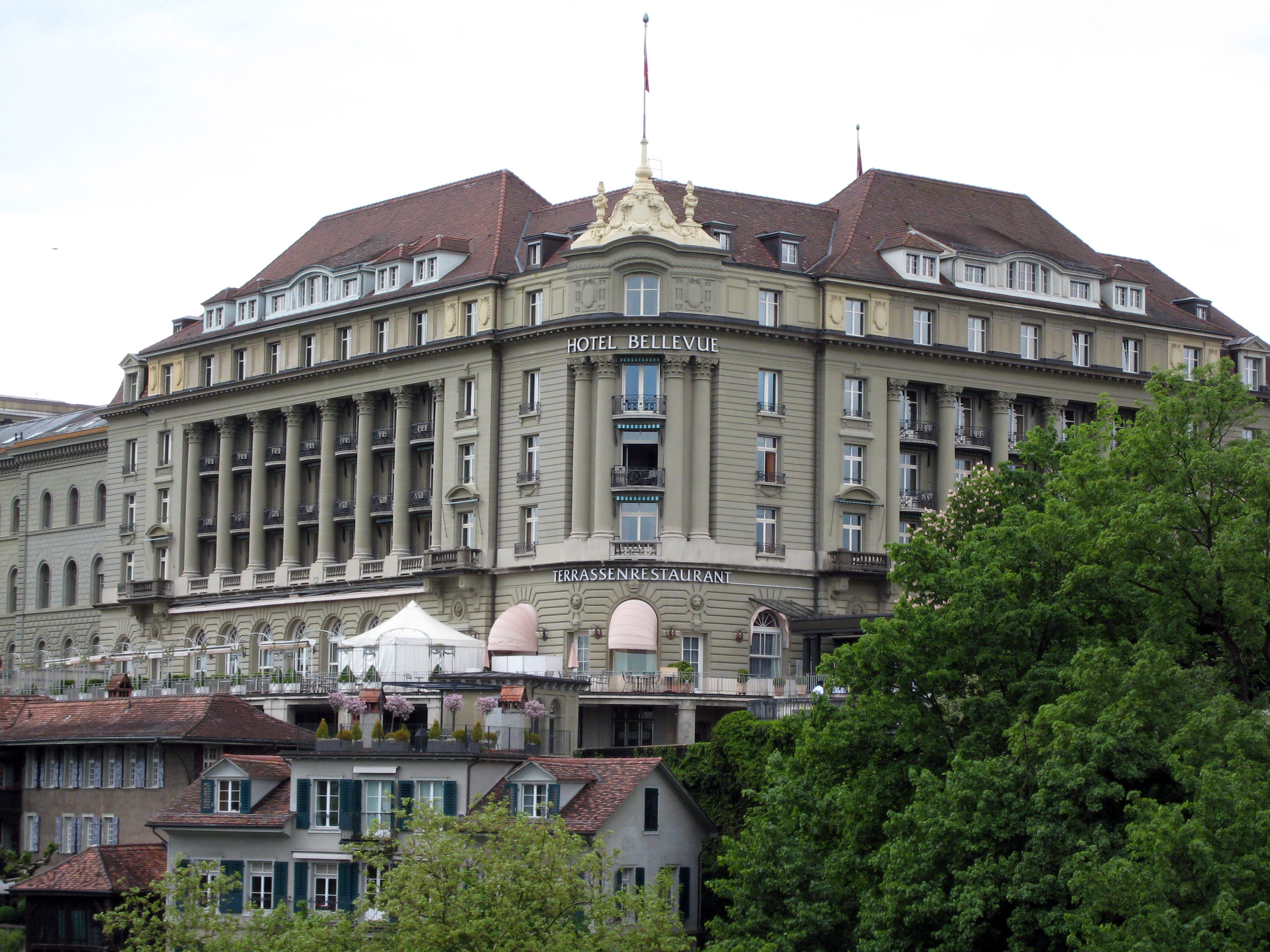
- Hotel Bellevue Palace
- Interactive map of the Bellevue Palace area

General information
- Location: Bern
- Coordinates: 46.9466°N 7.4466°E
- Opening: 1865, rebuilt 1912 and reopened 27 November 1913
- Owner: Swiss Confederation
- Operator: Victoria-Jungfrau Collection AG

Design and construction
- Architect: Architekturbüro Lindt und Hofmann
- Developer: Alphons and Philipp Osswald

Other information
- Number of rooms: 130

Website
- www.bellevue-palace.ch

The Bellevue Palace is a five-star luxury hotel located in the Old City of Bern, Switzerland. Owned by the Swiss Confederation, it is the state's guesthouse for visiting heads of state and government, and is host to dozens of members of parliament during the weeks the assembly is in session.

== History ==
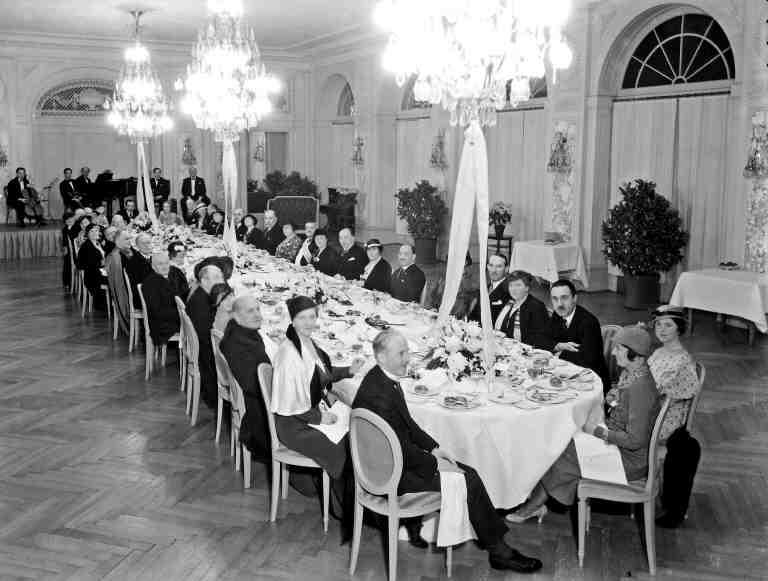
Reception in 1933

The original Bellevue Palace was built by the financier Friedrich Osswald in 1865 immediately adjacent to the seat of the federal government, the Bundeshaus. His heirs had the hotel torn down and rebuilt it in 1910 in the neoclassical style. The new Bellevue Palace was reopened in 1913, and General Ulrich Wille made it Switzerland's military headquarters during World War I. During World War II, the hotel became a focal point of the warring powers' diplomatic and intelligence activities in Switzerland, and its bar was a haunt of OSS station chief Allen Dulles. One half of the restaurant came to be frequented by Allied guests and the other by patrons from Axis states.

After the war, the hotel's fortunes declined sharply. To prevent the state hotel from being acquired by foreign buyers, the Swiss National Bank acquired it in 1976, and in 1994 made a gift of it to the Confederation, which retains 99.7% of the hotel's shares. After it became apparent that the Bellevue Palace was in need of an overhaul, as it lacked amenities such as air conditioning, it was closed in 2002 for a one-year renovation that cost CHF 40 million and cut the number of rooms from 230 to 130. Following a spate of bad publicity over low staff wages, the Confederation turned over the management to a chain of Swiss luxury hotels in 2007.

The Bellevue Palace has been host to a great number of heads of state and government, including Winston Churchill, Mikhail Gorbachev, Jawaharlal Nehru, Queen Elizabeth II and Emperor Akihito. When it was used as a negotiating venue in the Helsinki process during the Cold War, some participants called it "the best-protected building in Europe" due to its array of security features and extensive police protection. Parts of John le Carré's spy novel Smiley's People and its TV adaption are set in the Bellevue Palace. In Swiss politics, the hotel's bar and lounge are known to be the site of much late-night political horse trading during parliamentary sessions, such as arranging elections of Federal Councillors.

== Characteristics ==
Apart from ballrooms, restaurants, salons, bars and conference facilities, the Bellevue Palace features an array of suites, including an extensive "Presidential Suite" with a view of the Bernese Alps over the Aare. The hotel's cuisine is rated at 16 Gault Millau points. Frommer's Switzerland describes the Bellevue Palace as "the grand old dame of Bern" and "the most lavish and opulent choice in town", opining that "dining on the renowned Bellevue Terrace is one of the reasons to come to Bern." The hotel is a member of the Leading Hotels of the World association.

== See also ==
- List of hotels in Switzerland
- Tourism in Switzerland
