= Mark Flanagan (chef) =

British chef

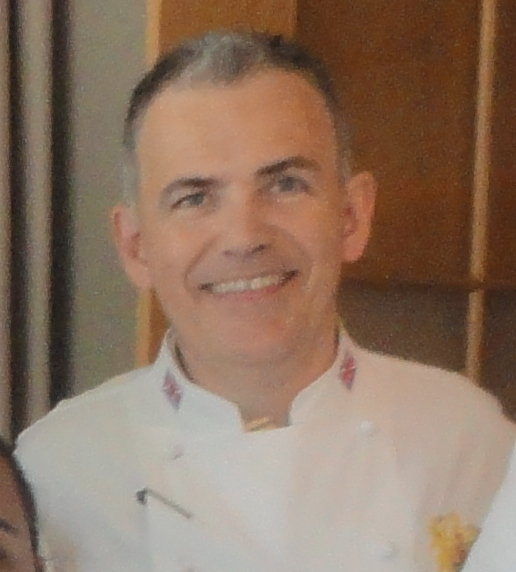
Mark Flanagan in 2014, during the annual meeting of Le Club des Chefs des Chefs

Mark Flanagan LVO is a British chef, known to be the personal chef of Charles III and head chef of the Royal Household.

In 2002, he succeeded Lionel Mann as Assistant to the Master of the Household and became the Royal Chef. He is in charge of a team of more than 50 people working at court, and is in charge of all meals for the royal household including the royal family.

During his career he was responsible for major court ceremonies:

- Wedding breakfast for the Duke and Duchess of Cambridge, 2011.
- State dinner in honour of President Obama, 2016.
- State dinner in honour of the King and Queen of Spain, 2017.

== Honours ==
- 2002–present: Royal Chef and Assistant to the Master of the Household at The Royal Household.
- Vice President of the C.C.C. (Le Club des Chefs des Chefs).
- Member of the Royal Académie of Culinary Arts.
- Member of the Académie culinaire.

Already Member of the Royal Victorian Order (MVO), Flanagan was appointed Lieutenant of the Royal Victorian Order (LVO) in the 2022 New Year Honours.

== The Platinum Pudding Competition ==
In January 2022 it was announced that Flanagan would sit as a judge on The Platinum Pudding Competition, a nationwide baking competition launched throughout the United Kingdom on 10 January 2022 by Buckingham Palace, Fortnum & Mason and The Big Jubilee Lunch to find a brand new pudding dedicated to Queen Elizabeth II as part of the official Platinum Jubilee celebrations in 2022 marking the 70th anniversary of the accession of Queen Elizabeth II on 6 February 1952.

== Books ==
Flanagan is the author of selected works on royal cuisine.

- Royal Teas: Seasonal Recipes from Buckingham Palace, ISBN 978-1909741331 (2017)
- A Royal Cookbook: Seasonal Recipes from Buckingham Palace, ISBN 978-1905686780 (2014)
