= Thai cuisine =

Culinary traditions of Thailand

Thai cuisine (Thai: อาหารไทย, RTGS: ahan thai, pronounced [ʔāː.hǎːn tʰāj]), the national cuisine of Thailand and of Thai people, places emphasis on lightly prepared dishes with aromatics and spicy heat. Traditional Thai cuisine loosely falls into four categories: tom (Thai: ต้ม, boiled dishes), yam (Thai: ยำ, spicy salads), tam (Thai: ตำ, pounded foods), and kaeng (Thai: แกง, curries). Deep-frying, stir-frying and steaming are methods introduced from Chinese cuisine.

In 2011, seven Thai dishes appeared on a list of the "World's 50 Best Foods", an online poll of 35,000 people worldwide by CNN Travel. Thailand had more dishes on the list than any other country: tom yum kung (4th), pad thai (5th), som tam (6th), massaman curry (10th), green curry (19th), Thai fried rice (24th) and nam tok mu (36th).. Thai cuisine is defined by its characteristic balance of sweet, sour, salty, and spicy flavors using fresh ingredients, aromatic herbs, and techniques like stir frying, steaming and deep frying.

== History ==
=== Historical influences ===
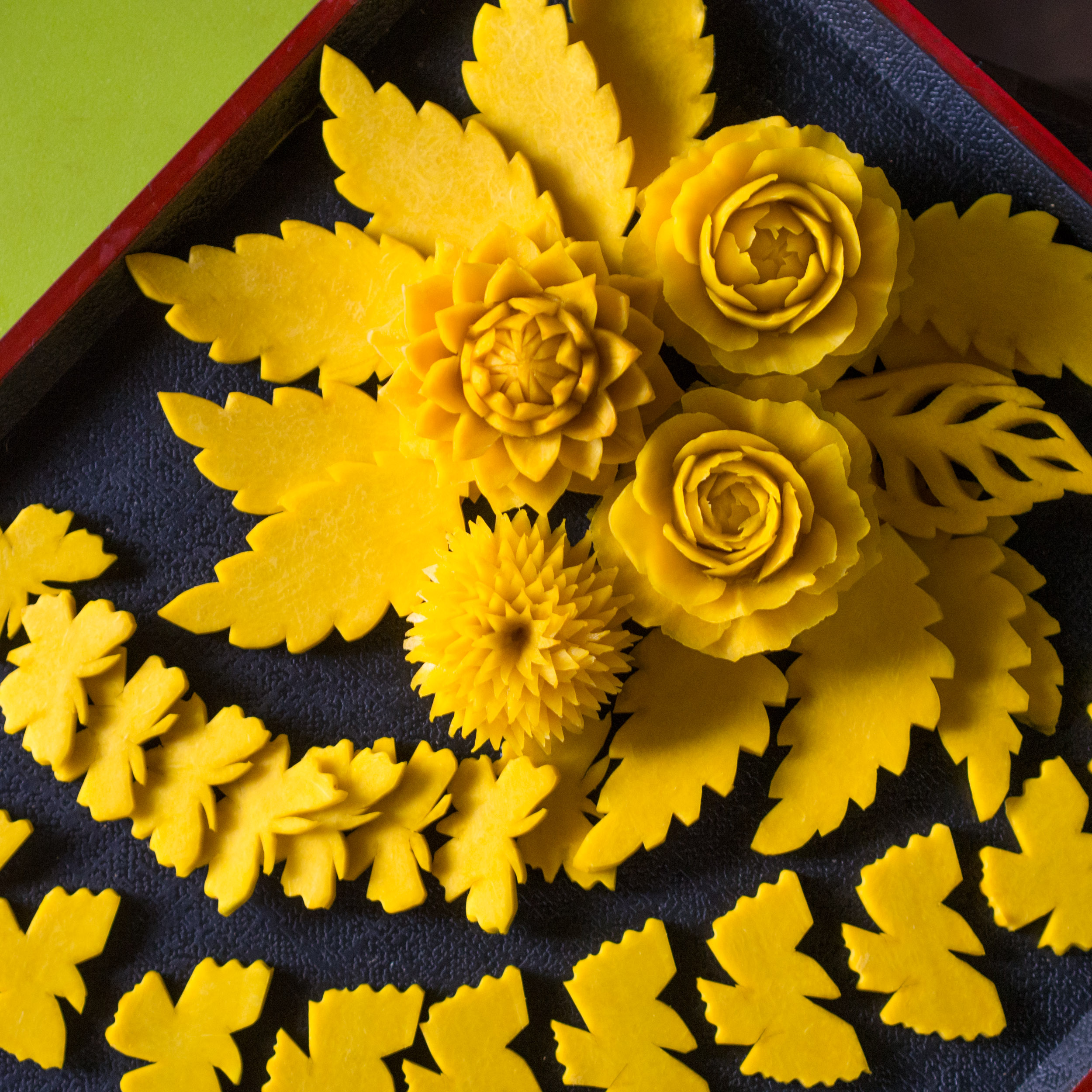
The local art of vegetable carving is believed to have begun in the Sukhothai Kingdom nearly 700 years ago.

Thai cuisine and the culinary traditions and cuisines of Thailand's neighbors, especially Cambodia, Laos, Myanmar, India, Malaysia and Indonesia, have influenced one another over the course of many centuries.

According to the Thai monk Venerable Buddhadasa Bhikku's writing, ‘India's Benevolence to Thailand’, Thai cuisine was influenced by Indian cuisine. He wrote that Thai people learned how to use spices in their food in various ways from Indians. Thais also obtained the methods of making herbal medicines from the Indians. Some plants like sarabhi of the family Guttiferae, panika or harsinghar, phikun or Mimusops elengi and bunnak or the rose chestnut etc. were brought from India. According to the book Mae Khrua Hua Pa (first published in 1908) by Lady Plian Bhaskarawongse, she found that Thai cuisine had a strong gastronomical cultural line from Sukhothai (1238–1448) through Ayuttthaya (1351–1767) and Thonburi period (1767–1782) vis-à-vis Siamese governmental officers' daily routines (such as royal cooking) and their related cousins. Thai food during the Thonburi period tended to be more similar to that from the Ayutthaya period, except the addition of Chinese food resulted from her prosperous international trade.

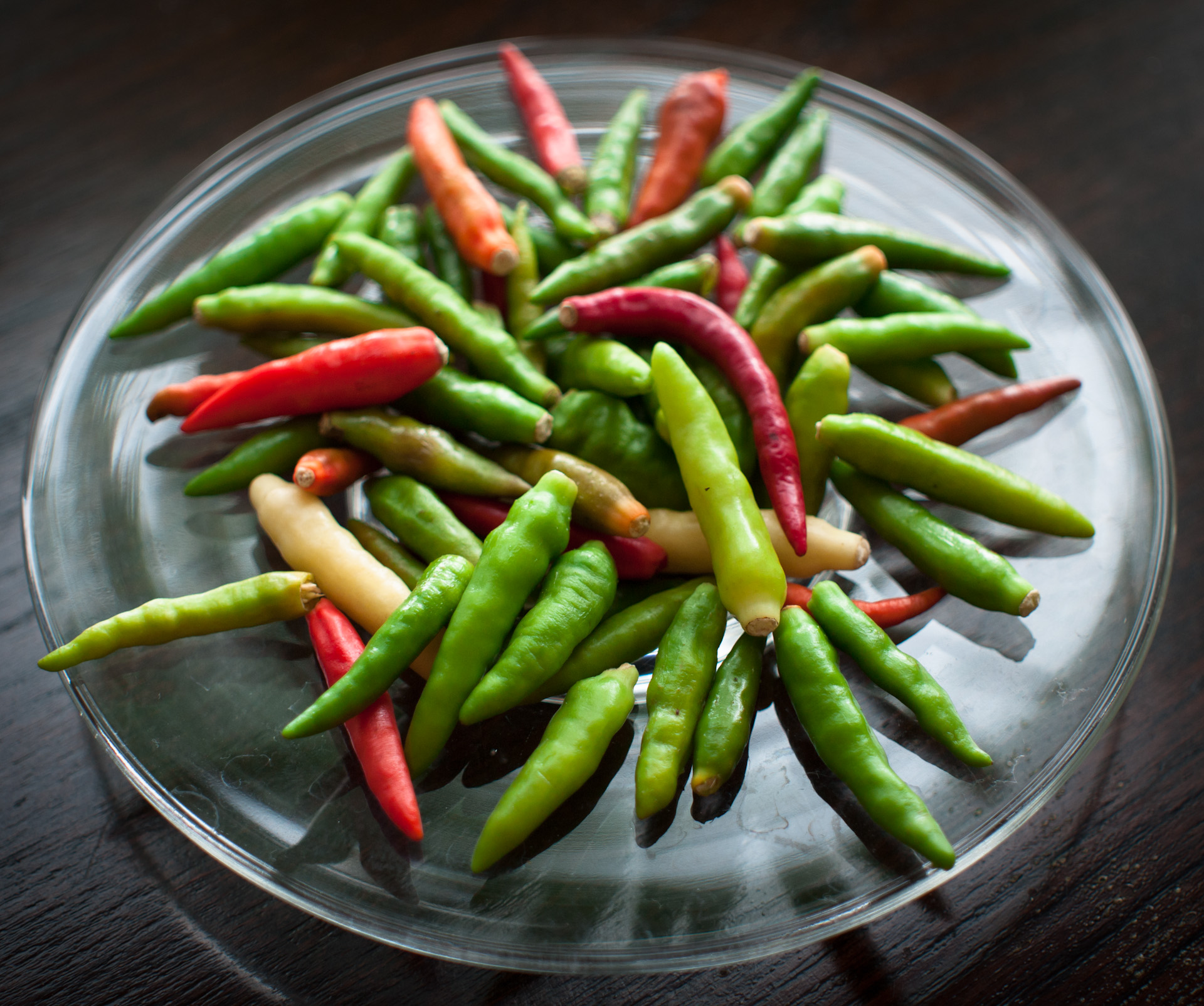
Chili peppers, originally from the Americas, were introduced to Thailand by the Portuguese and Spanish.

Western influences, starting in 1511 when the first diplomatic mission from the Portuguese arrived at the court of Ayutthaya, have created dishes such as foi thong, the Thai adaptation of the Portuguese fios de ovos, and sangkhaya, where coconut milk replaces cow's milk in making a custard. These dishes were said to have been brought to Thailand in the 17th century by Maria Guyomar de Pinha, a woman of mixed Japanese-Portuguese-Bengali ancestry who was born in Ayutthaya, and became the wife of Constantine Phaulkon, a Greek adviser to King Narai. The most notable influence from the West must be the introduction of the chili pepper from the Americas in the 16th or 17th century. It, and rice, are now two of the most important ingredients in Thai cuisine. During the Columbian Exchange, Portuguese and Spanish ships brought new foodstuffs from the Americas including tomatoes, corn, papaya, pea eggplants, pineapple, pumpkins, culantro, cashews, and peanuts.

=== Regional variations ===
Regional variations tend to correlate to neighboring states (often sharing the same cultural background and ethnicity on both sides of the border) as well as climate and geography. Northern Thai cuisine shares dishes with Shan State in Burma, northern Laos, and also with Yunnan Province in China, whereas the cuisine of Isan (northeastern Thailand) is similar to that of Southern Laos, and by Vietnamese cuisine to its east. Southern Thailand, with many dishes that contain liberal amounts of coconut milk and fresh turmeric, has that in common with Indian, Malaysian, and Indonesian cuisine.

Thai cuisine is more accurately described as five regional cuisines, corresponding to the five main regions of Thailand:

- Bangkok: cuisine of the Bangkok metropolitan area, with Teochew and Portuguese influences. In addition, as a capital city, Bangkok cuisine is sometimes influenced by more dedicated royal cuisine. Tastes and looks of food in Bangkok have changed somewhat over time as they have been influenced by other cuisines such as Asian, European or Western countries.
- Central Thai: cuisine of the flat and wet central rice-growing plains, site of the former Thai kingdoms of Sukhothai and Ayutthaya, and the Dvaravati culture of the Mon people from before the arrival of Siamese in the area. Coconut milk is one of major ingredients used in Central Thai cuisine.
- Isan or Northeastern Thai: cuisine of the more arid Khorat Plateau, influenced by the culture of Laos and also by Khmer cuisine.
- Northern Thai: cuisine of the cooler valleys and forested mountains of the Thai highlands, once ruled by the former Lanna Kingdom and home of Lannaese, the majority of northern Thailand. This cuisine shares many ingredients with Isan.
- Southern Thai: cuisine of the Kra Isthmus which is bordered on two sides by tropical seas, with its many islands and including the ethnic Malay, former Sultanate of Pattani in the deep south. The complex curries, food preparation techniques and usage of chillies and spices in Southern Thai cuisine form a great influence on the whole cuisine in general.

=== Royal cuisine ===
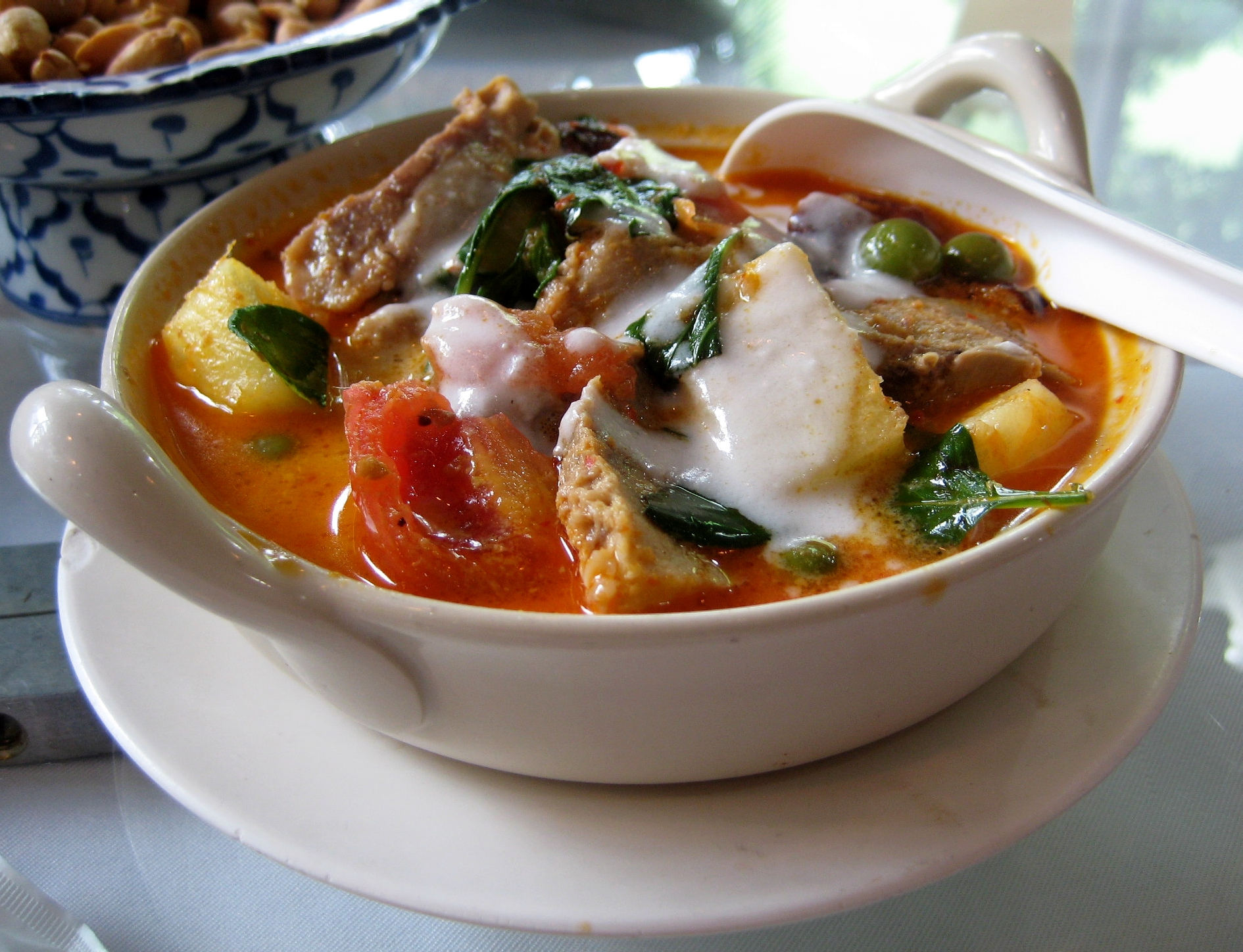
Kaeng phet pet yang, a legacy of the palace cuisine of Ayutthaya

In addition to these regional cuisines, there is also Thai royal cuisine which can trace its history back to the cosmopolitan palace cuisine of the Ayutthaya kingdom (1351–1767 CE). Its refinement, cooking techniques, presentation, and use of ingredients were of great influence to the cuisine of the central Thai plains. Thai royal cuisine has been influenced by the Khmer royal cuisine through the Khmer palace cooks brought to the Ayutthaya Kingdom during its conquests of the Khmer Empire. Thai royal cuisine has become very well known from the Rattanakosin Era onwards.

Typically, Thai royal cuisine has basic characteristics that are close to the basic food prepared by general people. However, Thai royal cuisine focuses on the freshness of seasonal products. Other than that, it is crucial that the way in which Thai royal food is cooked should be complex and delicate.

La Loubère, an envoy from France during the reign of King Narai, recorded that the food at the court was generally similar to villager food. What makes Thai royal cuisine different food is its beautiful presentation. For example, they served fish and chicken with the bones removed, and the vegetables were served in bite-sized portions. In addition, if beef is used, it should be tenderloin only.

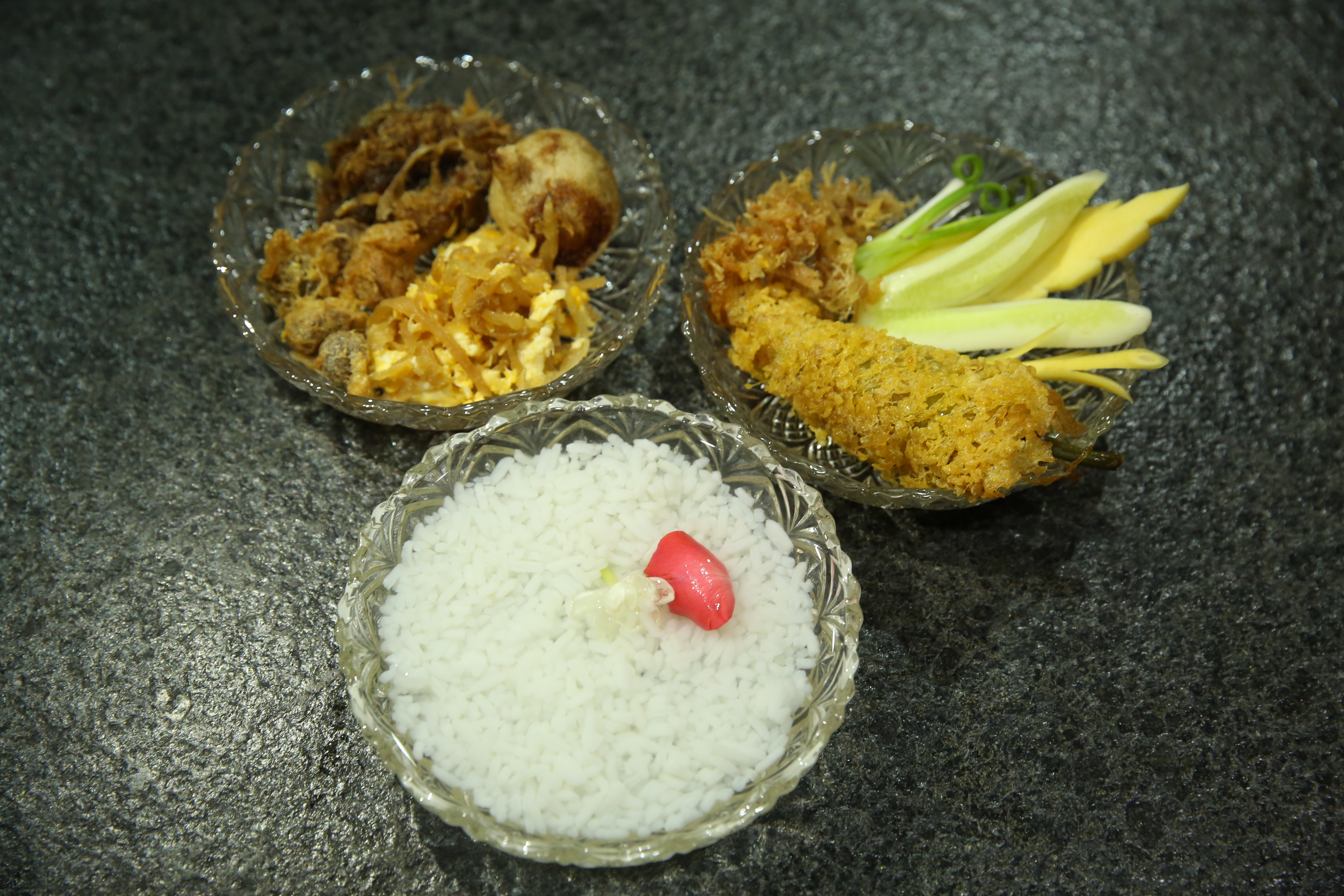
Khao chae

There are many types of Thai royal cuisine such as ranchuan curry, nam phrik long ruea, matsaman curry, rice in jasmine-flavored iced water or khao chae, spicy salad, fruit, and carved vegetable.

Thai chef McDang, himself descended from the royal family, asserts that the difference between royal Thai cuisine and regular Thai cuisine is fiction. He maintains that the only difference between the food of the palace and that of the common people is the former's elaborate presentation and better ingredients.

== Serving ==
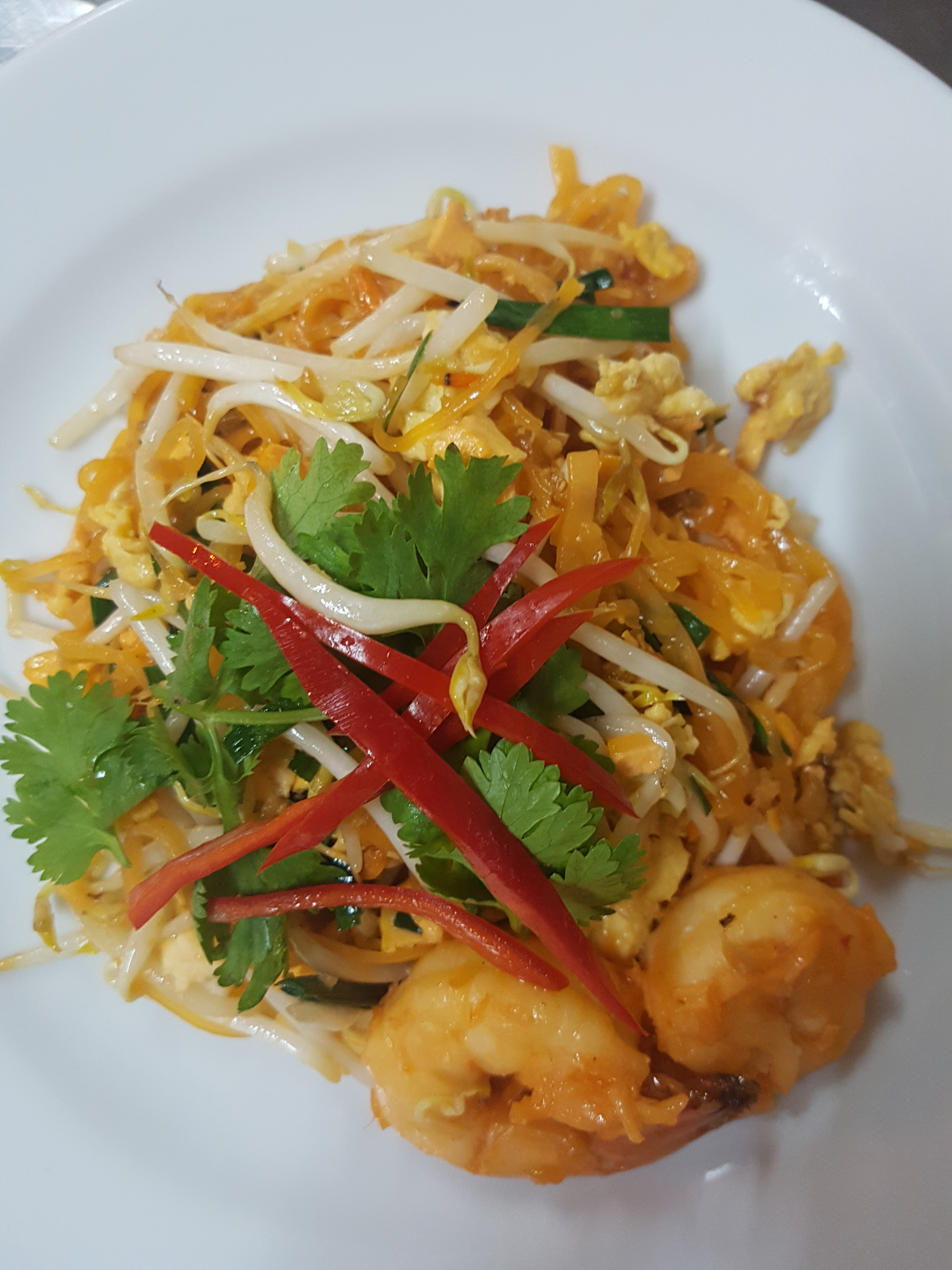
Phat thai kung, from Bangkok

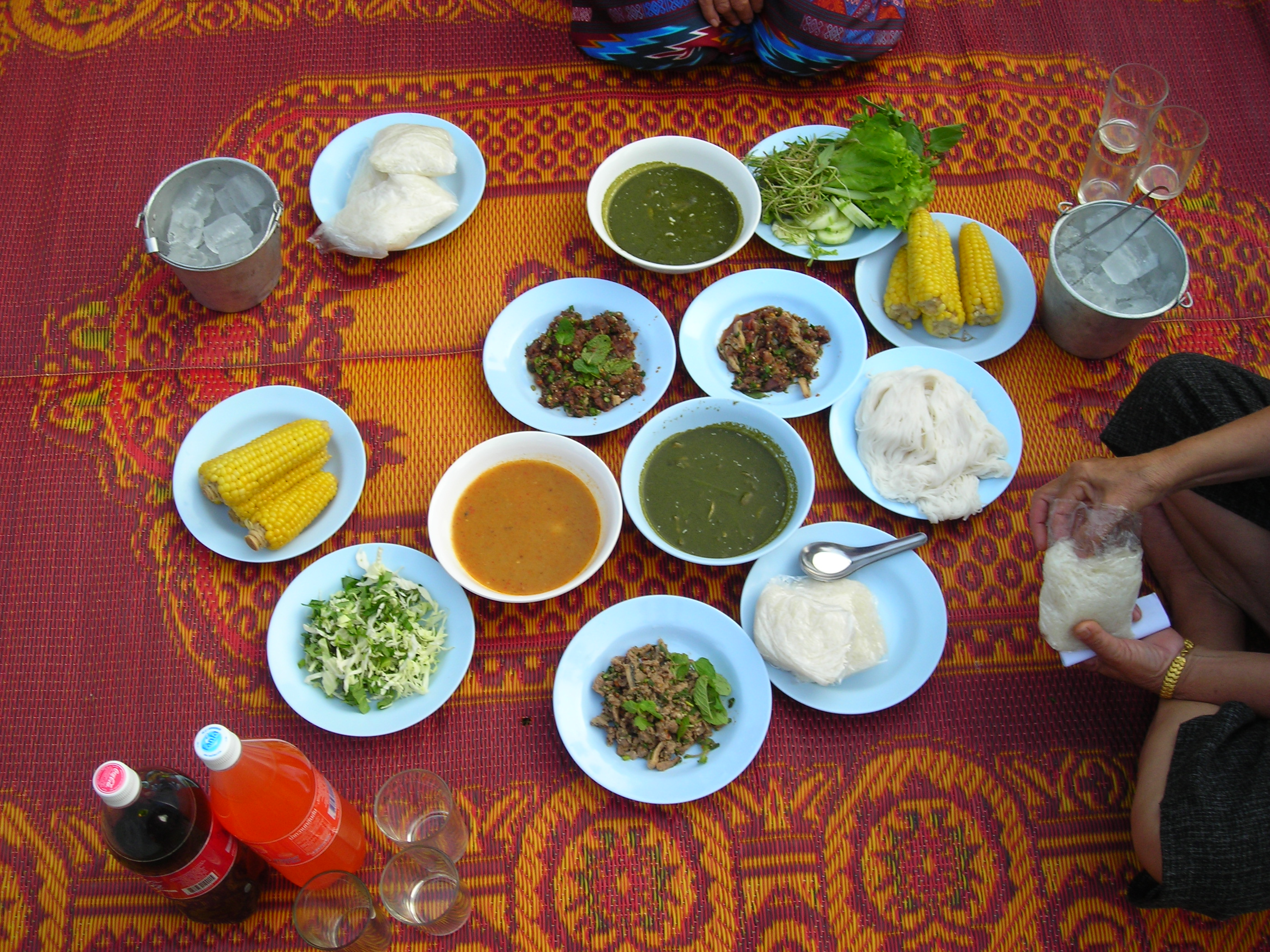
A typical family meal on the floor mat in Isan region

Thai food was traditionally eaten with the hand while seated on mats or carpets on the floor or coffee table in upper middle class families, customs still found in more traditional households. Today, however, most Thais eat with a fork and spoon. Tables and chairs were introduced as part of a broader Westernization drive during the reign of King Mongkut, Rama IV. The fork and spoon were introduced by King Chulalongkorn after his return from a tour of Europe in 1897 CE.

Important to Thai dining is the practice of khluk, mixing the flavors and textures of different dishes with the rice from one's plate. The food is pushed by the fork, held in the left hand, into the spoon held in the right hand, which is then brought to the mouth. A traditional ceramic spoon is sometimes used for soup, and knives are not generally used at the table. It is common practice for both the Thais and the hill tribe peoples who live in Lanna and Isan to use sticky rice as an edible implement by shaping it into small, and sometimes flattened, balls by hand (and only the right hand by custom) which are then dipped into side dishes and eaten.

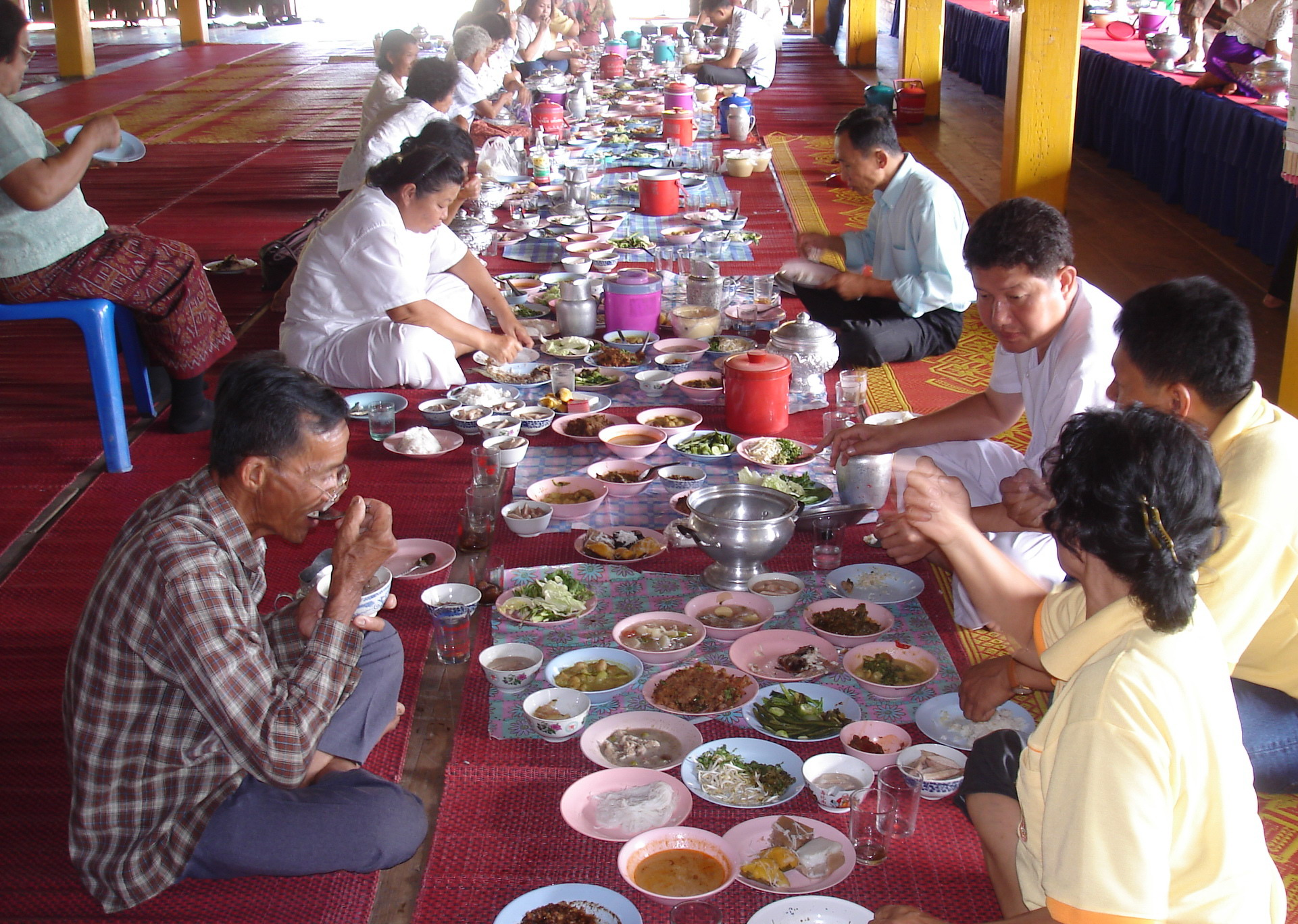
Thai meal in a village temple

Chopsticks were foreign utensils to most ethnic groups in Thailand with the exception of the Thai Chinese, and a few other cultures such as the Akha people, who are recent arrivals from Yunnan Province, China. Traditionally, the majority of ethnic Thai people ate with their hands like the people of India. Chopsticks are mainly used in Thailand for eating Chinese-style noodle soups, or at Chinese, Japanese, or Korean restaurants. Stir-fried noodle dishes such as drunken noodles, pad see ew, and pad thai, and curry-noodle dishes such as khanom chin nam ngiao, are also eaten with a fork and spoon in the Thai fashion.

Thai meals typically consist of rice (khao in Thai) with many complementary dishes shared by all. The dishes are all served at the same time, including the soups, and it is also customary to provide more dishes than there are guests at a table. A Thai family meal would normally consist of rice with several dishes which should form a harmonious contrast of flavors and textures as well as preparation methods. Traditionally, a meal would have at least five elements: a dip or relish for raw or cooked vegetables (khrueang chim) is the most crucial component of any Thai meal. Khrueang chim, considered a building block of Thai food by Chef McDang, may come in the form of a spicy chili sauce or relish called nam phrik (made of raw or cooked chilies and other ingredients, which are then mashed together), or a type of dip enriched with coconut milk called lon. The other elements would include a clear soup (perhaps a spicy tom yam or a mellow tom chuet), a curry or stew (essentially any dish identified with the kaeng prefix), a deep-fried dish, and a stir-fried dish of meat, fish, seafood, or vegetables.

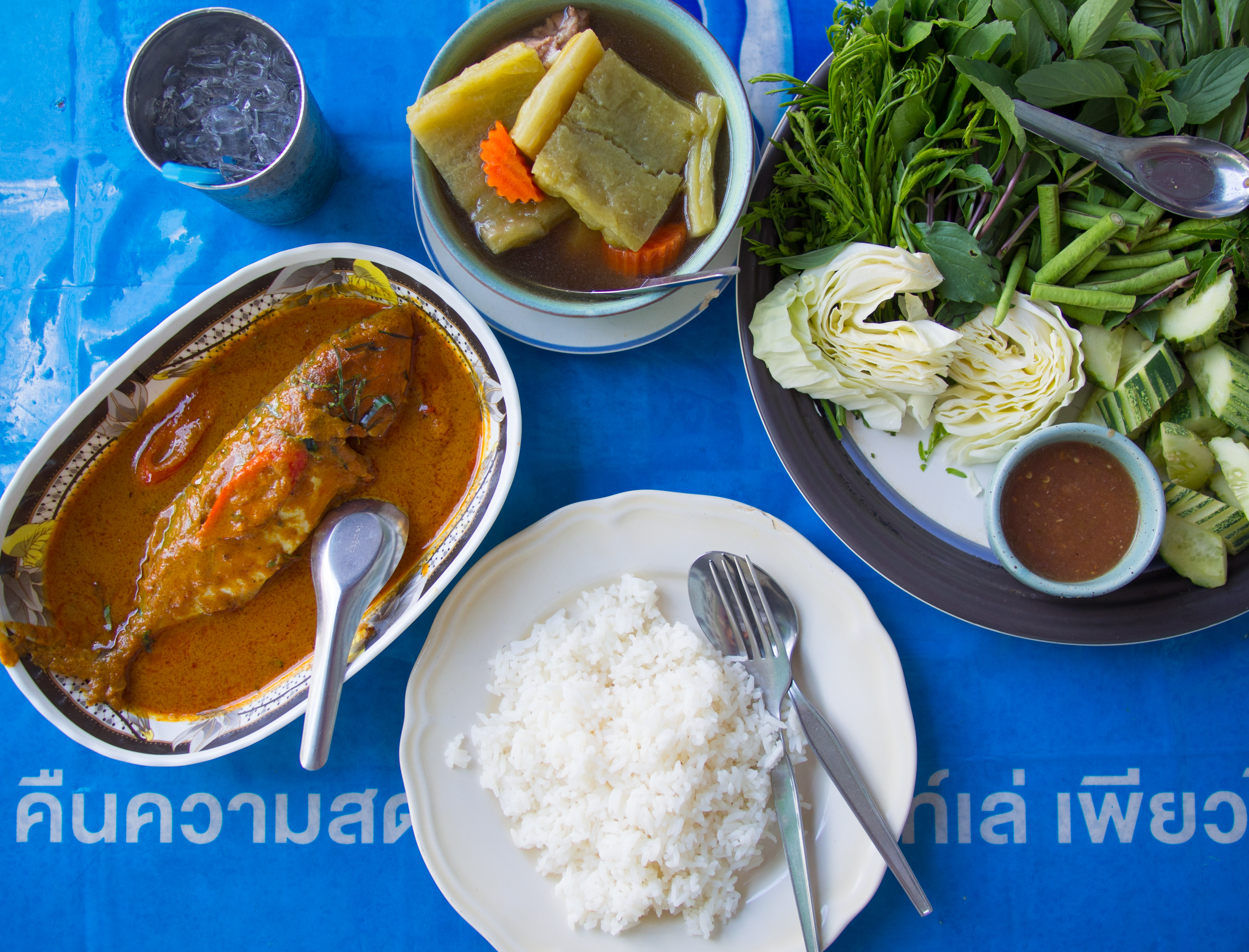
A plate of raw vegetables and herbs, together with nam phrik kapi, is often served as a complementary dish at southern Thai eateries.

In most Thai restaurants, diners will have access to a selection of Thai sauces (nam chim) and condiments, either brought to the table by wait staff or present at the table in small containers. These may include phrik nam pla/nam pla phrik (fish sauce, lime juice, chopped chilies and garlic), dried chili flakes, sweet chili sauce, sliced chili peppers in rice vinegar, Sriracha sauce, and even sugar. With certain dishes, such as khao kha mu (pork trotter stewed in soy sauce and served with rice), whole Thai peppers and raw garlic are served in addition to the sour chili sauce. Cucumber is sometimes eaten to cool the mouth with particularly spicy dishes. They often feature as a garnish, especially with one-dish meals. The plain rice, sticky rice or the khanom chin (Thai rice noodles) served alongside a spicy Thai curry or stir-fry, tends to counteract the spiciness.

When time is limited or when eating alone, single dishes, such as fried rice or noodle soups, are quick and filling. An alternative is to have one or more smaller helpings of curry, stir fries and other dishes served together on one plate with a portion of rice. This style of serving food is called khao rat kaeng (lit. 'rice covered with curry'), or for short khao kaeng (lit. 'rice curry'). Eateries and shops that specialize in pre-made food are the usual place to go to for having a meal this way. These venues have a large display showing the different dishes one can choose. When placing an order at these places, Thais will state if they want the food served as separate dishes or together on one plate with rice (rat khao). Very often, regular restaurants will also feature a selection of freshly made "rice curry" dishes on their menu for single customers.

== Ingredients ==
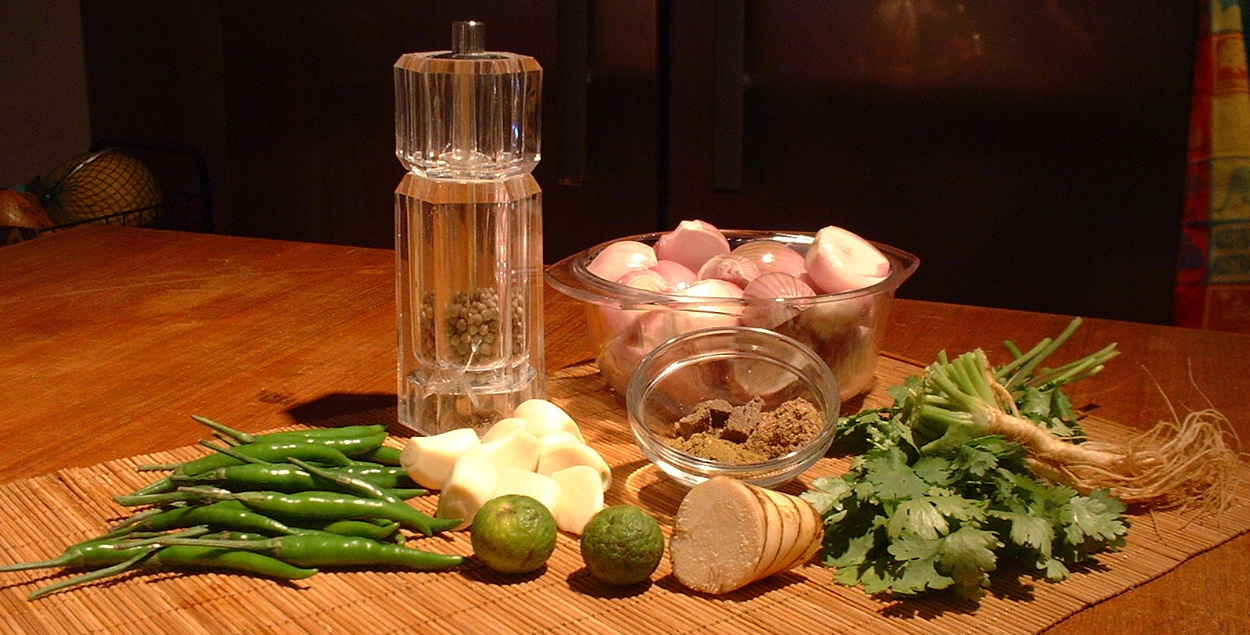
Ingredients, green curry paste

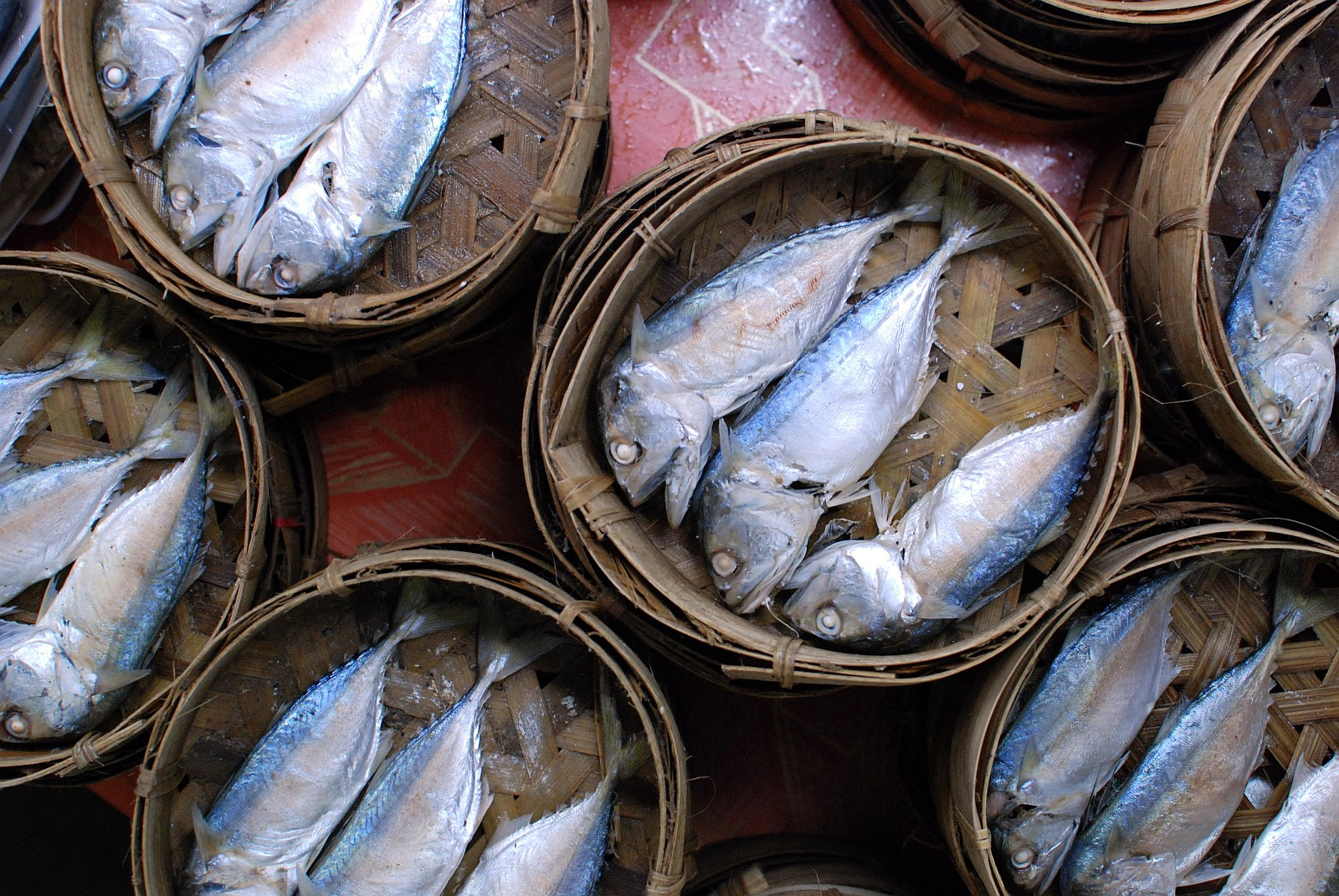
Pla thu at a market

Thai cuisine, as a whole, features many different ingredients (suan phasom; Thai: ส่วนผสม), and ways of preparing food. Thai chef McDang characterises Thai food as having "intricacy, attention to detail, texture, color, and taste. The Australian chef David Thompson, a Western expert on Thai food, observes that unlike many other cuisines, Thai cooking is "about the juggling of disparate elements to create a harmonious finish. Like a complex musical chord it's got to have a smooth surface but it doesn't matter what's happening underneath. Simplicity isn't the dictum here, at all."

Thai food is known for its enthusiastic use of fresh (rather than dried) herbs and spices. Common flavors in Thai food come from garlic, galangal, coriander/cilantro, lemongrass, shallots, pepper, kaffir lime leaves, shrimp paste, fish sauce, and chilies. Palm sugar, made from the sap of certain Borassus palms, is used to sweeten dishes while lime and tamarind contribute sour notes. Meats used in Thai cuisine are usually pork and chicken, and also duck, beef, and water buffalo. Goat, lamb, and mutton are rarely eaten except by Muslim Thais in Southern Thailand. Game, such as wild boar, deer and wild birds, are now less common due to loss of habitat, the introduction of modern methods of intensive animal farming in the 1960s, and the rise of agribusinesses, such as Thai Charoen Pokphand Foods, in the 1980s. Traditionally, fish, crustaceans, and shellfish play an important role in the diet of Thai people. In 2006 the per capita consumption of fish was 33.6 kg. Anna Leonowens (of The King and I fame) observed in her book The English Governess at the Siamese Court (1870):

"The stream is rich in fish of excellent quality and flavour, such as is found in most of the great rivers of Asia; and is especially noted for its platoo, a kind of sardine, so abundant and cheap that it forms a common seasoning to the labourer's bowl of rice."

Freshwater varieties come from the many rivers, lakes, ponds, and paddy fields inland, and seafood from the tropical seas of the southern half of the country. Some species, such as the giant river prawn, need brackish water as juveniles but live out their lives in freshwater once mature. Aquaculture of species such as Nile tilapia, catfish, tiger prawns, and blood cockles, now generates a large portion of the seafood sold in, and exported from Thailand.

=== Rice, noodles and starches ===
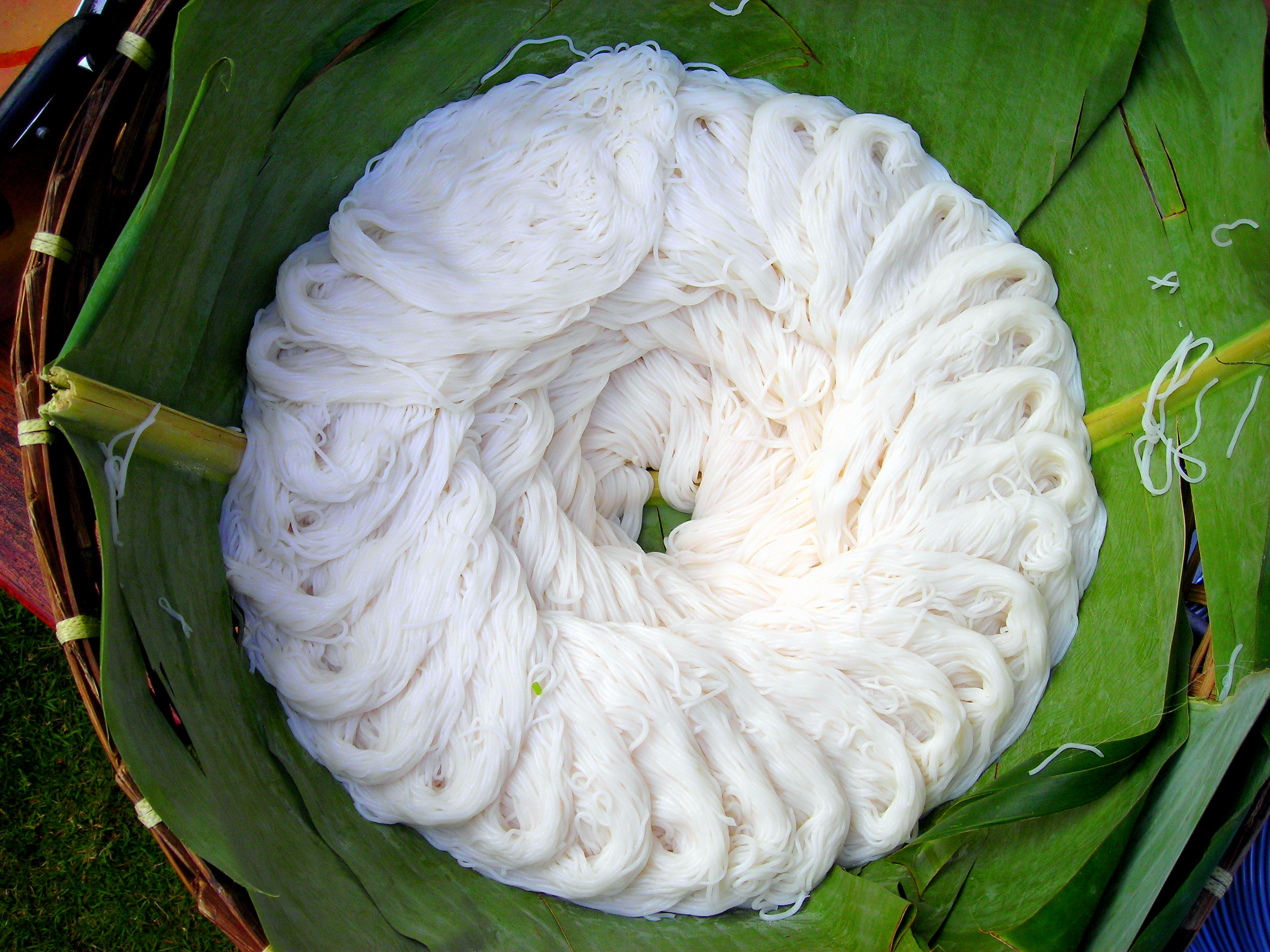
Khanom chin, freshly made Thai rice noodles

Like most other Asian cuisines, rice is the staple grain of Thai cuisine. According to Thai food expert McDang, rice is the first and most important part of any meal, and the words for rice and food are the same: khao. As in many other rice eating cultures, to say "eat rice" (in Thai "kin khao", pronounced [kīn kʰâːw]) means to eat food. Rice is such an integral part of the diet that a common Thai greeting is "kin khao rue yang?" (lit. '"have you eaten rice yet?').

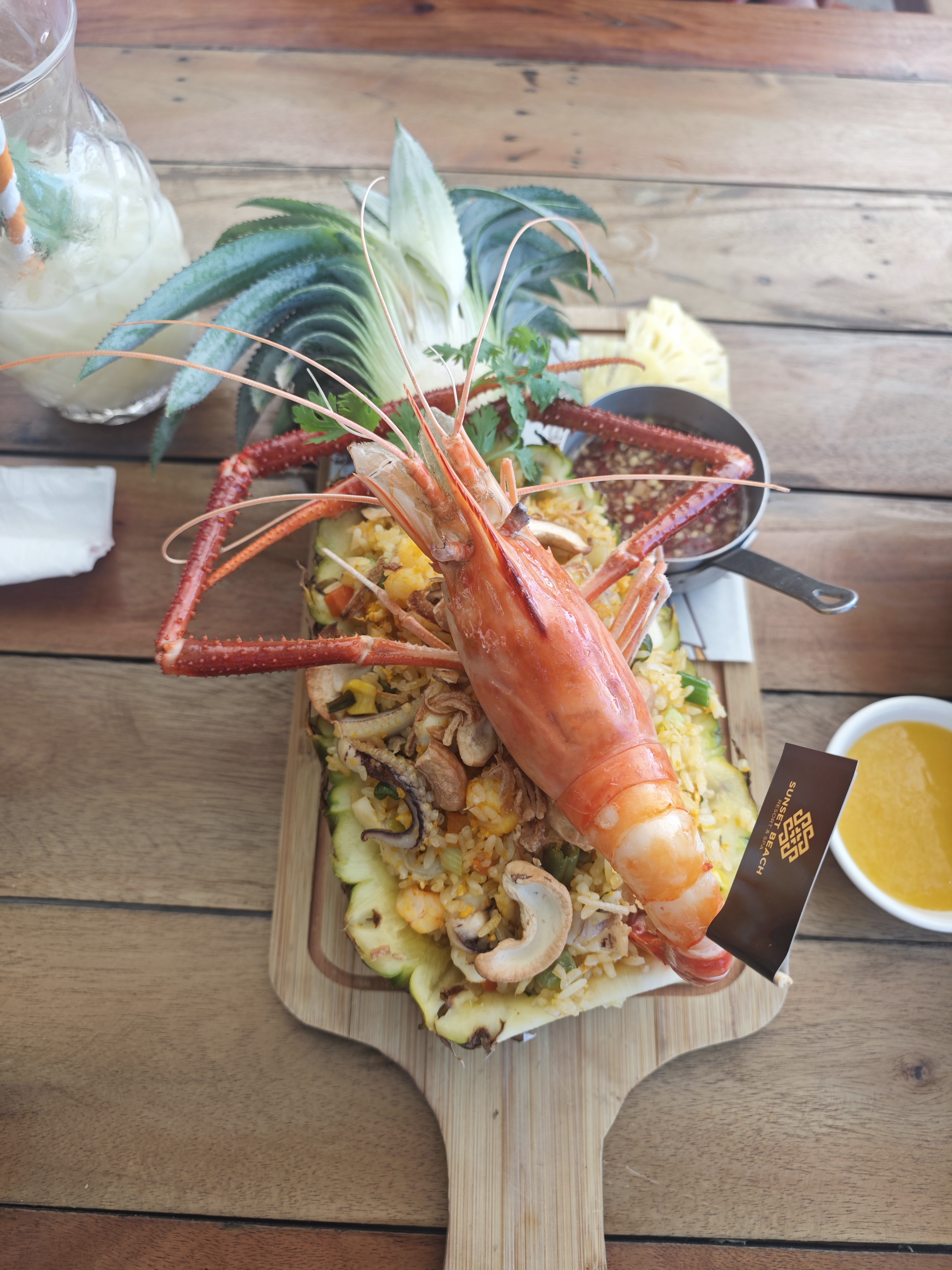
Seafood fried rice served in a pineapple

Thai farmers historically have cultivated tens of thousands of rice varieties. The traditional recipe for a rice dish could include as many as 30 varieties of rice. That number has been drastically reduced due to genetic modifications.

Non-glutinous rice (Oryza sativa) is called khao chao (lit. 'royal rice'). One type, which is indigenous to Thailand, is the highly prized, sweet-smelling jasmine rice (khao hom mali). This naturally aromatic long-grained rice grows in abundance in the patchwork of paddy fields that blanket Thailand's central plains. Once the rice is steamed or cooked, it is called khao suai (lit. 'beautiful rice'). Non-glutinous rice is used for making fried rice dishes, and for congee, of which there are three main varieties: khao tom (a thin rice soup, most often with minced pork or fish), khao tom kui (a thick, unflavored rice porridge that is served with side dishes), or chok (a thick rice porridge that is flavored with broth and minced meat).

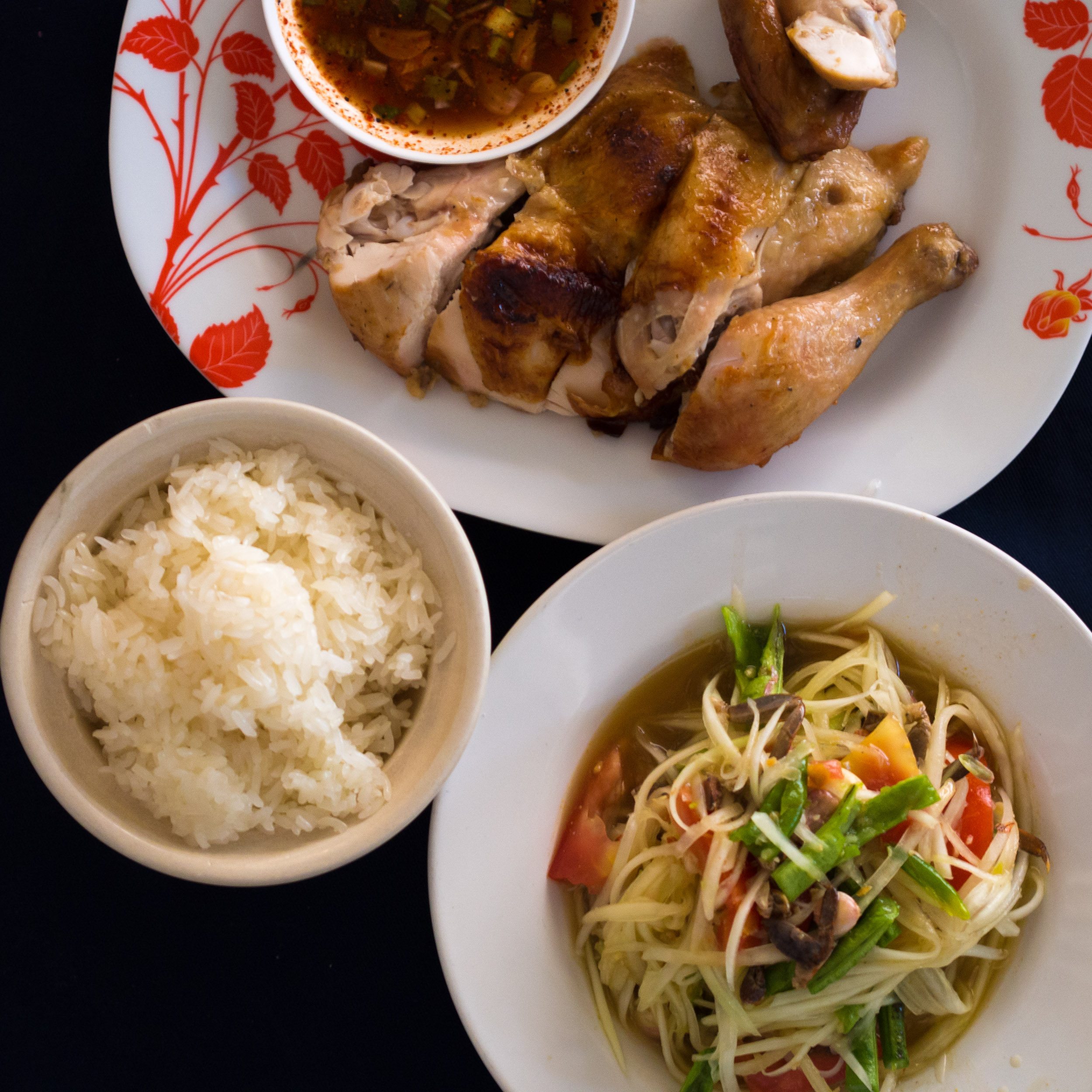
Som tam, grilled chicken and sticky rice is a popular combination.

Other varieties of rice eaten in Thailand include: sticky rice (khao niao), a unique variety of rice which contains an unusual balance of the starches present in all rice, causing it to cook up to a sticky texture. Thai Red Cargo rice, an unpolished long grain rice with an outer deep reddish-brown color and a white center, has a nutty taste and is slightly chewy compared to the soft and gummy texture of jasmine rice. Only the husks of the red rice grains are removed which allows it to retain all its nutrients and vitamins, but unlike brown rice, its red color comes from antioxidants in the bran. Black sticky rice is a type of sticky rice with a deep purple-red color that may appear black. Another unpolished grain, black sticky rice has a rich nutty flavor that is most often used in desserts.

Noodles in Thailand are usually made from the flour of rice, wheat, or mung bean. Perhaps one of the oldest type of noodle in Thailand is khanom chin, which is a fresh type of rice vermicelli made from fermented rice, and eaten with toppings like green curry (kaeng khiao wan) with chicken or in green papaya salad (som tam). Other noodle varieties were subsequently introduced by Chinese migrants to Thailand, as is testified by their Sino-Thai name kuaitiao (ก๋วยเตี๋ยว; Chinese: 粿條; pinyin: guǒtiáo). The three most common rice varieties of kuaitiao are sen yai (เส้นใหญ่) wide flat noodles, sen lek (เส้นเล็ก) narrow flat noodles, and sen mi เส้นหมี่; or rice vermicelli), which are round and thin. A fourth popular variety, bami (บะหมี่; Pe̍h-ōe-jī: bah-mī) is made from egg and wheat flour and is usually sold fresh. Bami are similar to the Teochew mee pok. A fifth type, wun sen (วุ้นเส้น; lit. 'jelly strands'), called cellophane noodles or glass noodles in English, are thin round noodles made from mung bean flour which are sold dried. Lastly, and least common in noodle shops, are "silver needle noodles" kiam-i (เกี้ยมอี๋), a somewhat thick round rice noodle similar in size and shape to bean sprouts. Thai noodle dishes, whether stir fried like pad thai or in the form of a noodle soup, usually come as an individual serving and are not meant to be shared and eaten communally.

Rice flour (paeng khao chao) and tapioca flour (paeng man sampalang) are often used in desserts or as thickening agents.

=== Pastes and sauces ===
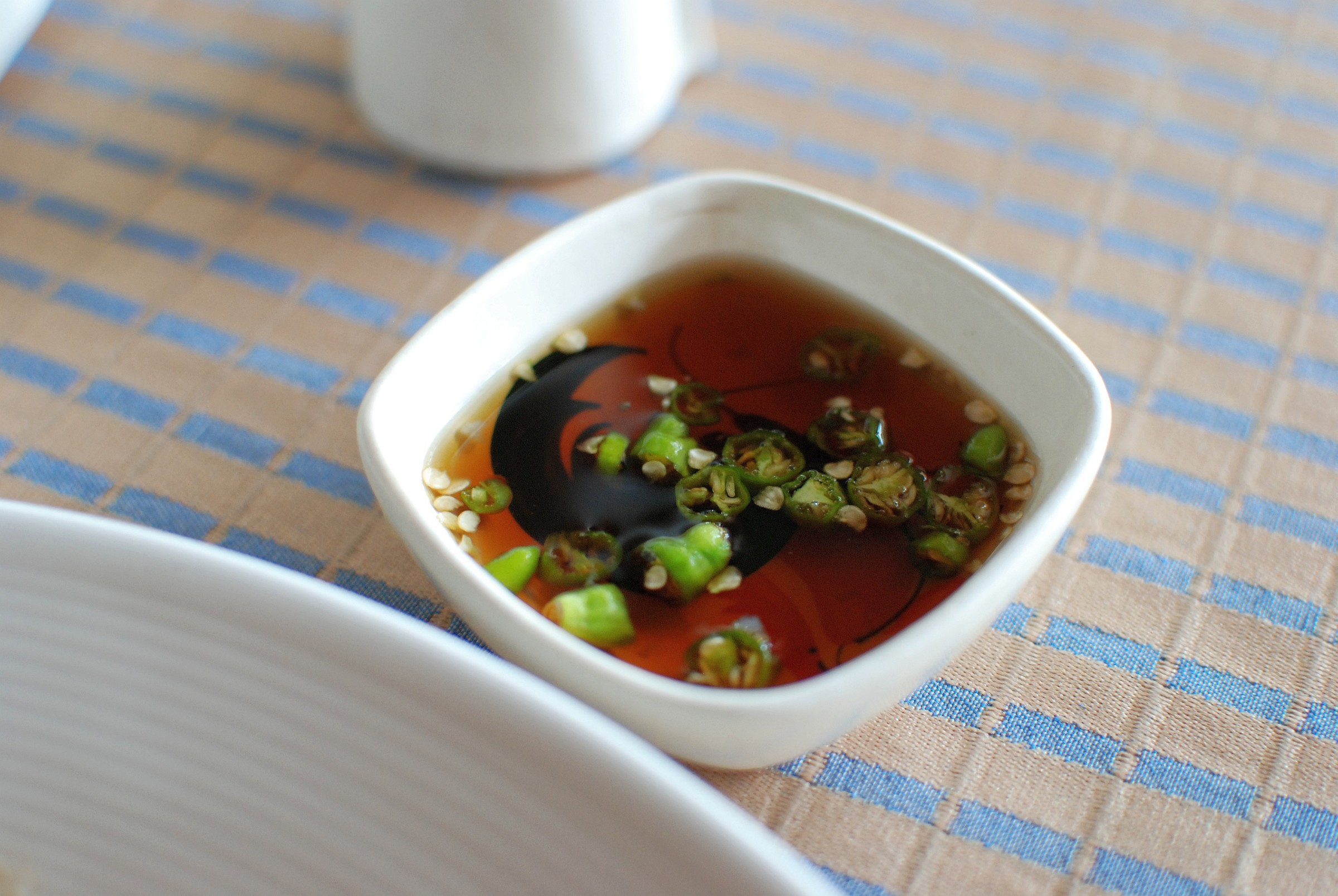
Nam pla phrik, a table sauce most often eaten with rice dishes, is made from fish sauce and sliced chilies, and often also includes garlic and lime.

An ingredient found in many Thai dishes and used in every region of the country is nam pla, a clear fish sauce that is very aromatic. Fish sauce is a staple ingredient in Thai cuisine and imparts a unique character to Thai food. Fish sauce is prepared with fermented fish that is made into a fragrant condiment and provides a salty flavor. There are many varieties of fish sauce and many variations in the way it is prepared. Some fish may be fermented with shrimp or spices. Another type of sauce made from fermented fish is pla ra. It is more pungent than nam pla, and, in contrast to nam pla, which is a clear liquid, pla ra is opaque and often contains pieces of fish. To add this sauce to a som tam (spicy papaya salad) is a matter of choice. Kapi, Thai shrimp paste, is a combination of fermented ground shrimp and salt. It is used in the famous chili paste called nam phrik kapi, in rice dishes such as khao khluk kapi and it is indispensable for making Thai curry pastes. Tai pla is a pungent sauce used in the southern Thai cuisine, that is made from the fermented innards of the short mackerel (pla thu). It is one of the main condiments of kaeng tai pla curry and is also used to make nam phrik tai pla. Far removed from the nearest sea, from northern Thailand comes nam pu, a thick, black paste made by boiling mashed rice-paddy crabs for hours. It is used as an ingredient for certain northern Thai salads, curries, and chili pastes. It too has a strong and pungent flavor.

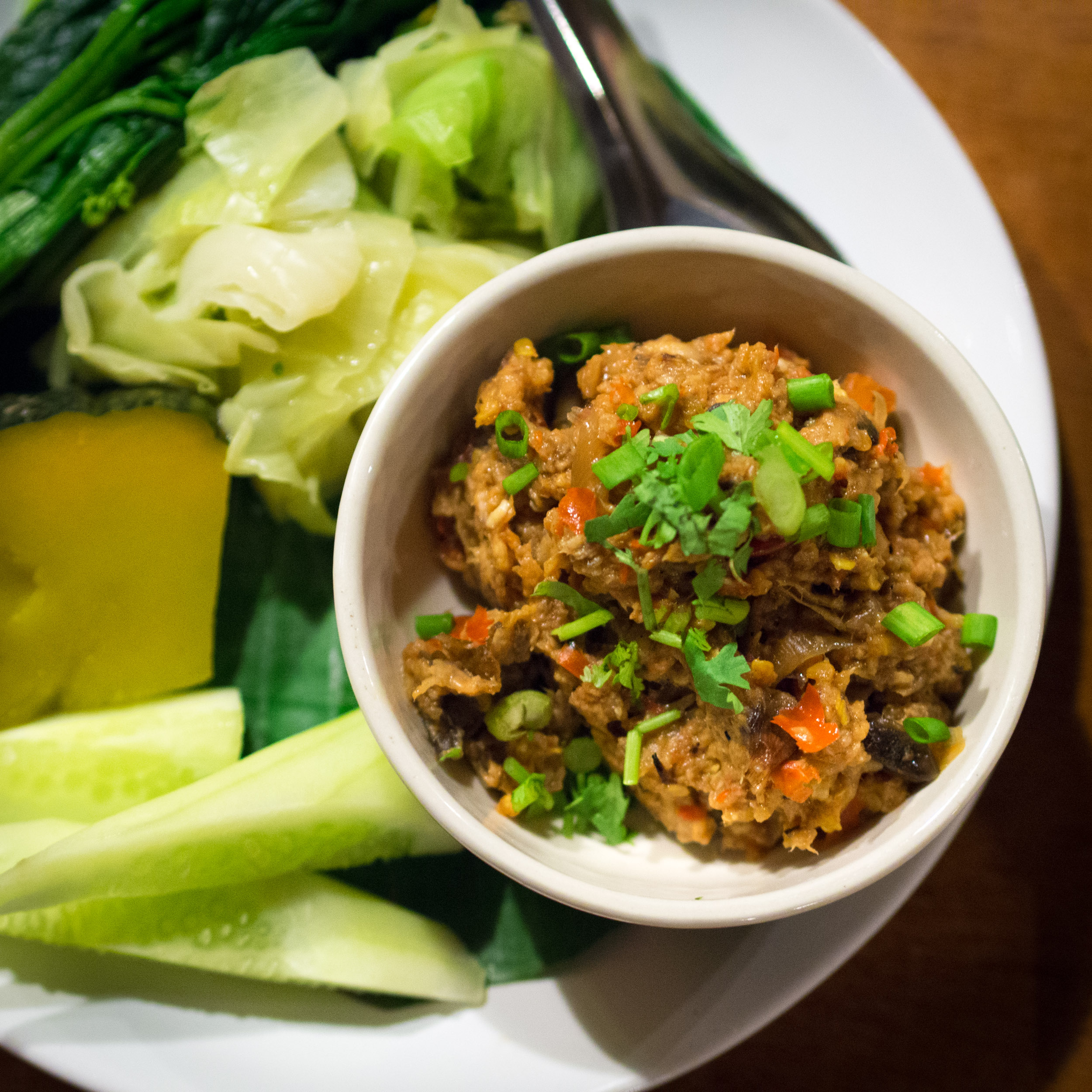
Nam phrik pla chi (a chili paste from northern Thailand made with grilled fish) is served here with raw and steamed vegetables as one of the dishes in a communal meal.

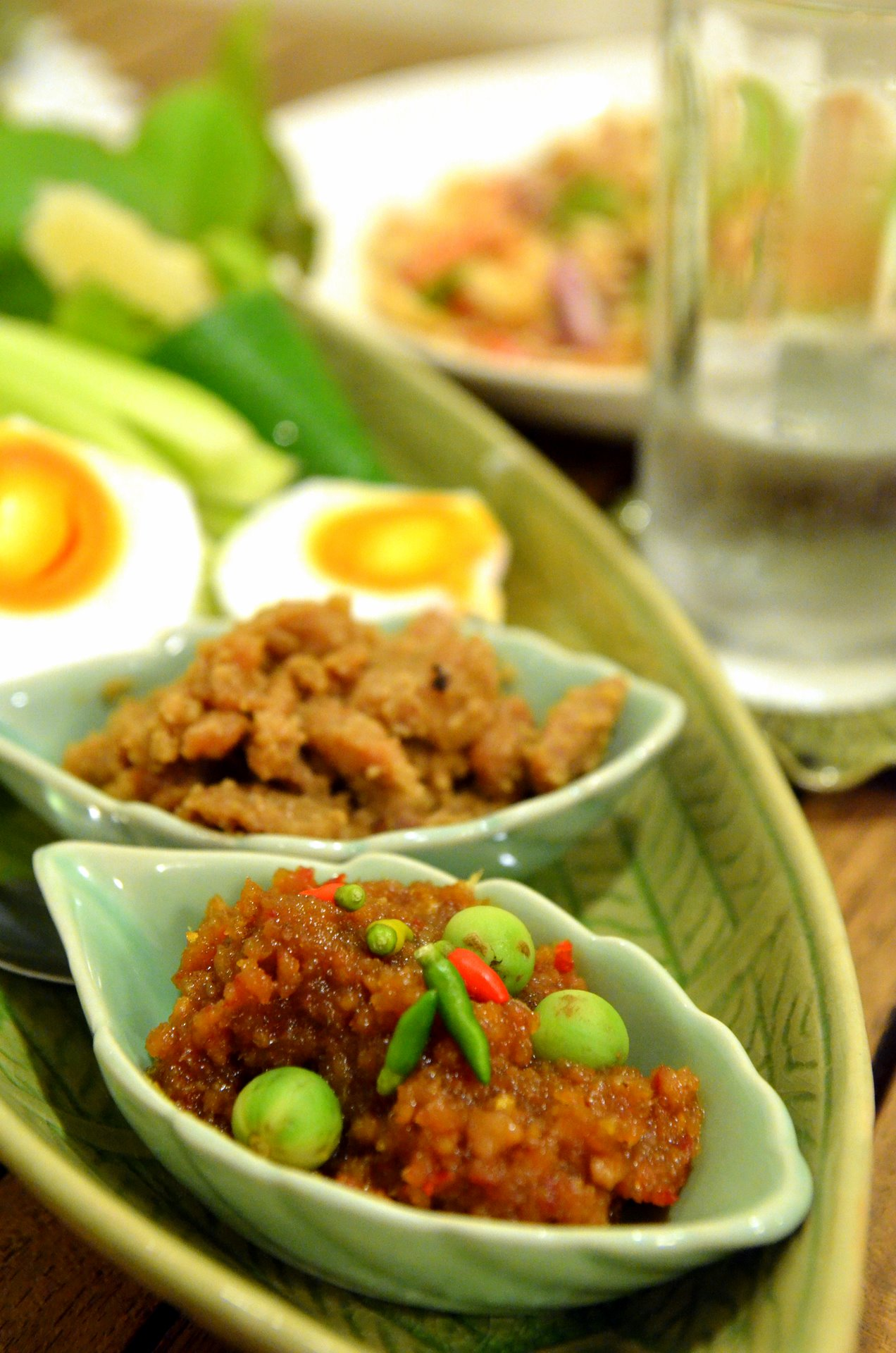
Nam phrik long ruea.

Nam phrik are Thai chili pastes, similar to the Indonesian and Malaysian sambals. Each region has its own special versions. The words "nam phrik" are used by Thais to describe many pastes containing chilies used for dipping, although the more watery versions tend to be called nam chim. Thai curry pastes are normally called phrik kaeng or khrueang kaeng (lit. 'curry ingredients'), but some people also use the word nam phrik to designate a curry paste. Red curry paste, for instance, could be called phrik kaeng phet or khrueang kaeng phet in Thai, but also nam phrik kaeng phet. Both nam phrik and phrik kaeng are prepared by crushing together chilies with various ingredients such as garlic and shrimp paste using a mortar and pestle. Some nam phrik are served as a dip with vegetables such as cucumbers, cabbage and yard-long beans, either raw or blanched. One such paste is nam phrik num, a paste of pounded fresh green chilies, shallots, garlic and coriander leaves. The sweet roasted chili paste called nam phrik phao is often used as an ingredient in tom yam or when frying meat or seafood, and it is also popular as a spicy "jam" on bread, or served as a dip with prawn crackers. The dry nam phrik kung, made with pounded dried shrimp (kung haeng), is often eaten plain with rice and a few slices of cucumber. French diplomat Simon de la Loubère observed that chili pastes were vital for the way Thai people eat. He provides us with a recipe for nam phrik with pla ra and onions in Du Royaume de Siam, an account of his mission to Thailand published in 1691.

The soy sauces which are used in Thai cuisine are of Chinese origin, and the Thai names for them are (wholly or partially) loanwords from the Teochew dialect: si-io dam (black soy sauce), si-io khao (light soy sauce), si-io wan (sweet soy sauce), and taochiao (fermented whole soy beans). Namman hoi (oyster sauce) is also of Chinese origin. It is used extensively in vegetable and meat stir fries.

Satay is also common in Thailand, grilled or skewered meat served with a spicy peanut dipping sauce made from roasted or fried peanuts.

=== Vegetables, herbs and spices ===
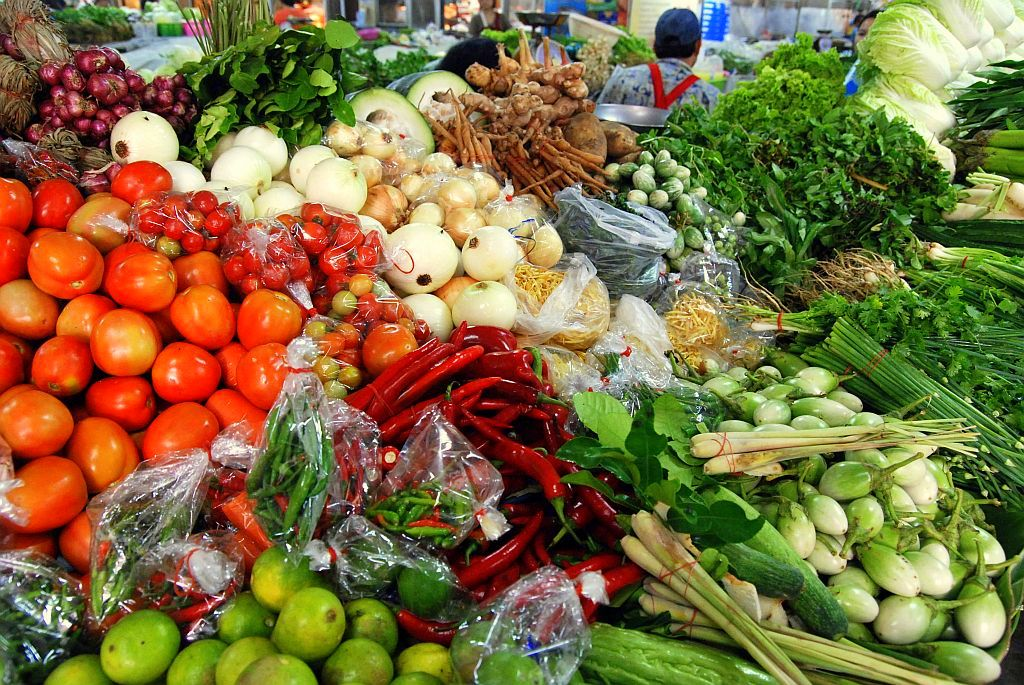
A vegetable stall, Chiang Mai

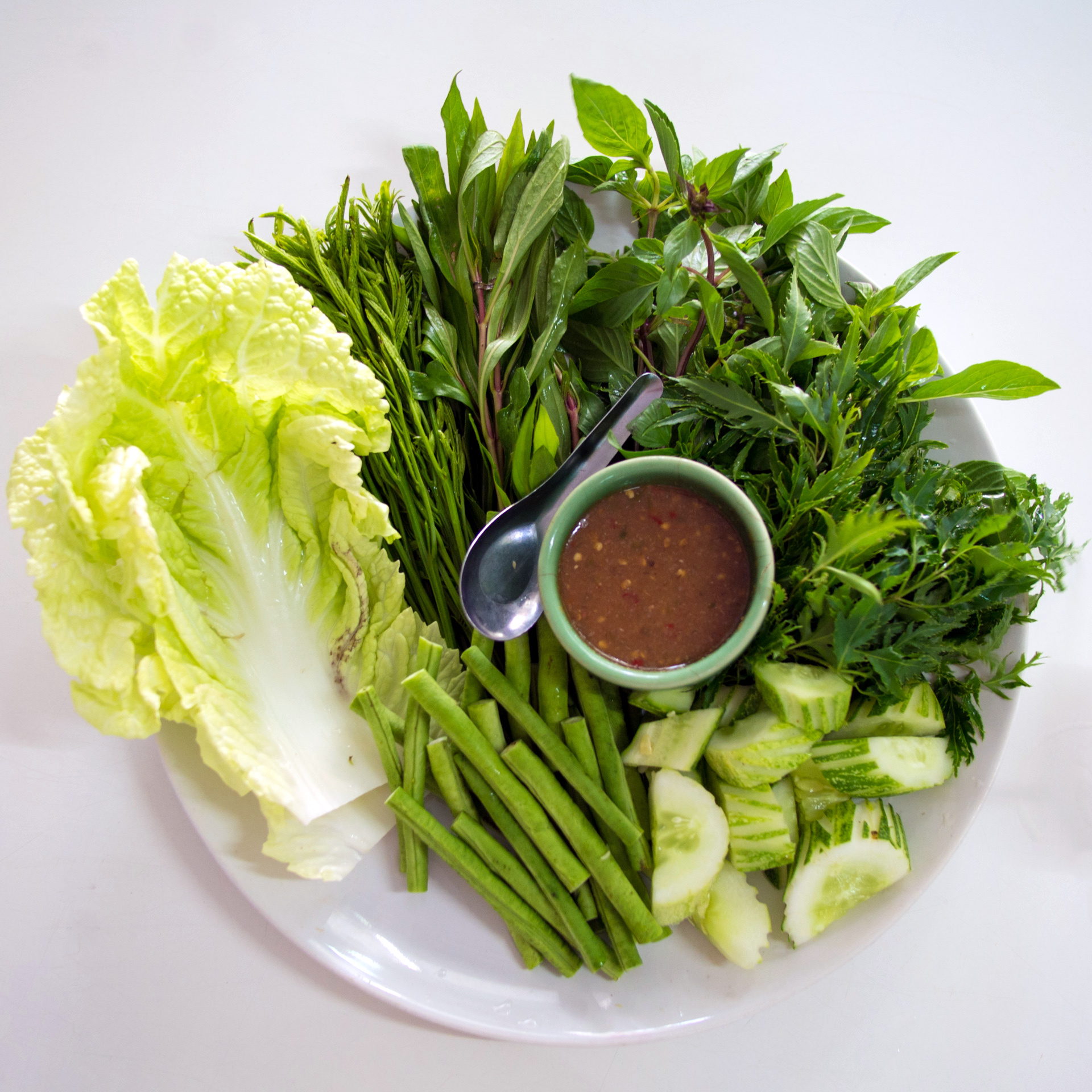
At southern Thai restaurants most often a vegetable and herbs platter with nam phrik kapi is served as a complimentary dish

Thai dishes use a wide variety of herbs, spices and leaves rarely found in the West. The characteristic flavor of kaffir lime leaves (bai makrut) appears in many Thai soups (e.g., the hot and sour tom yam) or curry from the southern and central areas of Thailand. The Thai lime (manao) is smaller, darker and sweeter than the kaffir lime, which has a rough looking skin with a stronger lime flavor. Kaffir lime leaves or rind is frequently combined with galangal (kha) and lemongrass (takhrai), either kept whole in simmered dishes or blended together with liberal amounts of chilies and other aromatics to make curry paste. Fresh Thai basil, distinctively redolent of cloves, and with stems which are often tinged with a purple color, are used to add fragrance in certain dishes such as green curry. Other commonly used herbs in Thai cuisine include phak chi, (coriander or cilantro leaves), rak phak chi (cilantro/coriander roots), spearmint (saranae), holy basil (kaphrao), ginger (khing), turmeric (khamin), fingerroot (krachai), culantro (phak chi farang), pandanus leaves (bai toei), and Thai lemon basil (maenglak). Spices and spice mixtures used in Thai cuisine include phong phalo (five-spice powder), phong kari (curry powder), and fresh and dried peppercorns (phrik thai). Northern Thai larb uses a very elaborate spice mix, called phrik lap, which includes ingredients such as cumin, cloves, long pepper, star anise, prickly ash seeds and cinnamon.

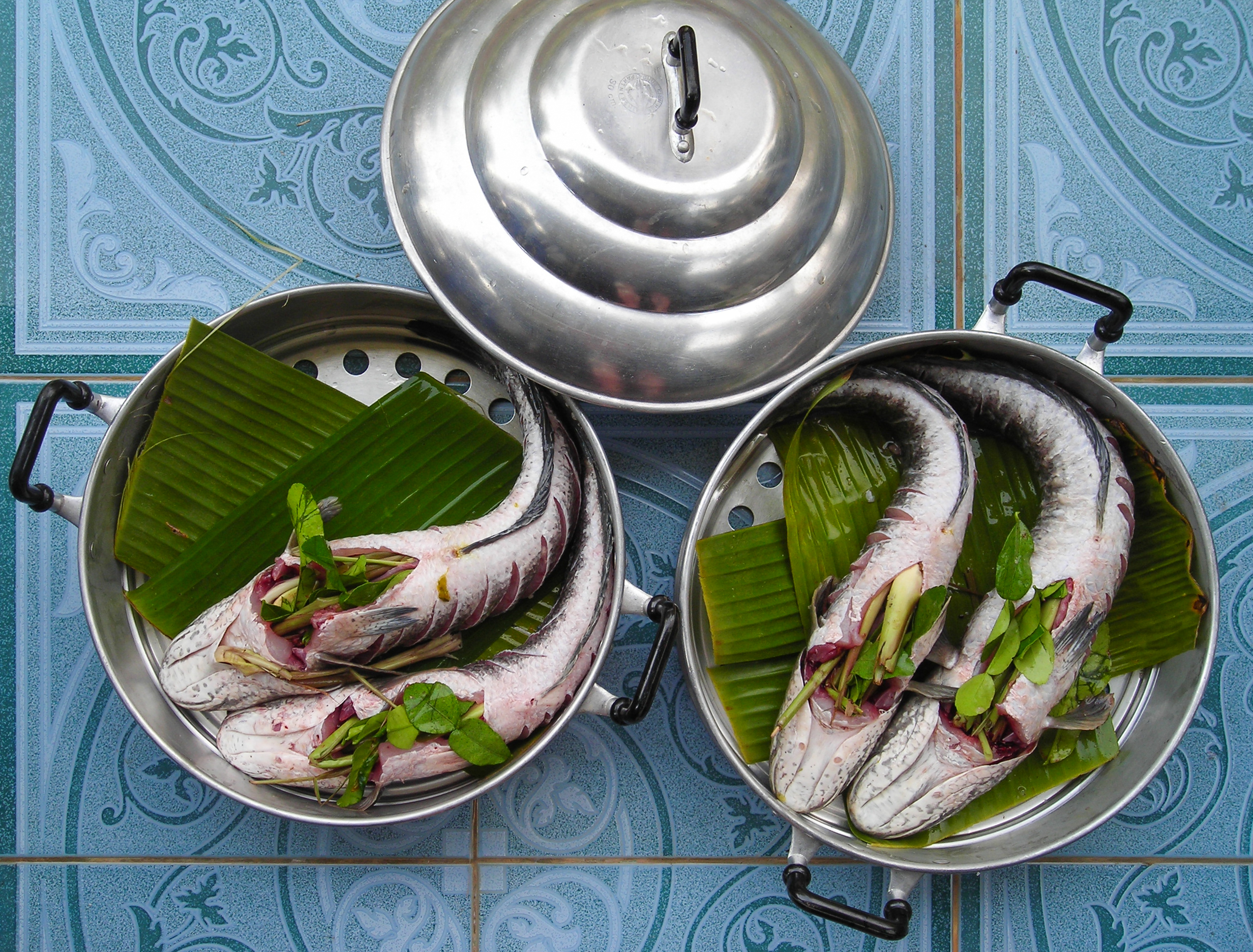
Snakehead fish packed with lemongrass and kaffir lime leaves ready for steaming

Besides kaffir lime leaves, several other tree leaves are used in Thai cuisine such as cha-om, the young feathery leaves of the Acacia pennata tree. These leaves can be cooked in omelettes, soups and curries or eaten raw in northern Thai salads. Banana leaves are often used as packaging for ready-made food or as steamer cups such as in ho mok pla, a spicy steamed pâté or soufflé made with fish and coconut milk. Banana flowers are also used in Thai salads or as a vegetable ingredient for certain curries. The leaves and flowers of the neem tree (sadao) are also eaten blanched. Phak lueat (leaves from the Ficus virens) are cooked in curries, and bai makok (from the Spondias mombin) can be eaten raw with a chili paste.

Five main chilies are generally used as ingredients in Thai food. One chili is very small (about 1.25 centimetres (0.49 in)) and is known as the hottest chili: phrik khi nu suan ("garden mouse-dropping chili"). The slightly larger chili phrik khi nu ("mouse-dropping chili") is the next hottest. The green or red phrik chi fa ("sky pointing chili") is slightly less spicy than the smaller chilies. The very large phrik yuak, which is pale green in color, is the least spicy and used more as a vegetable. Lastly, the dried chilies: phrik haeng are spicier than the two largest chilies and dried to a dark red color.

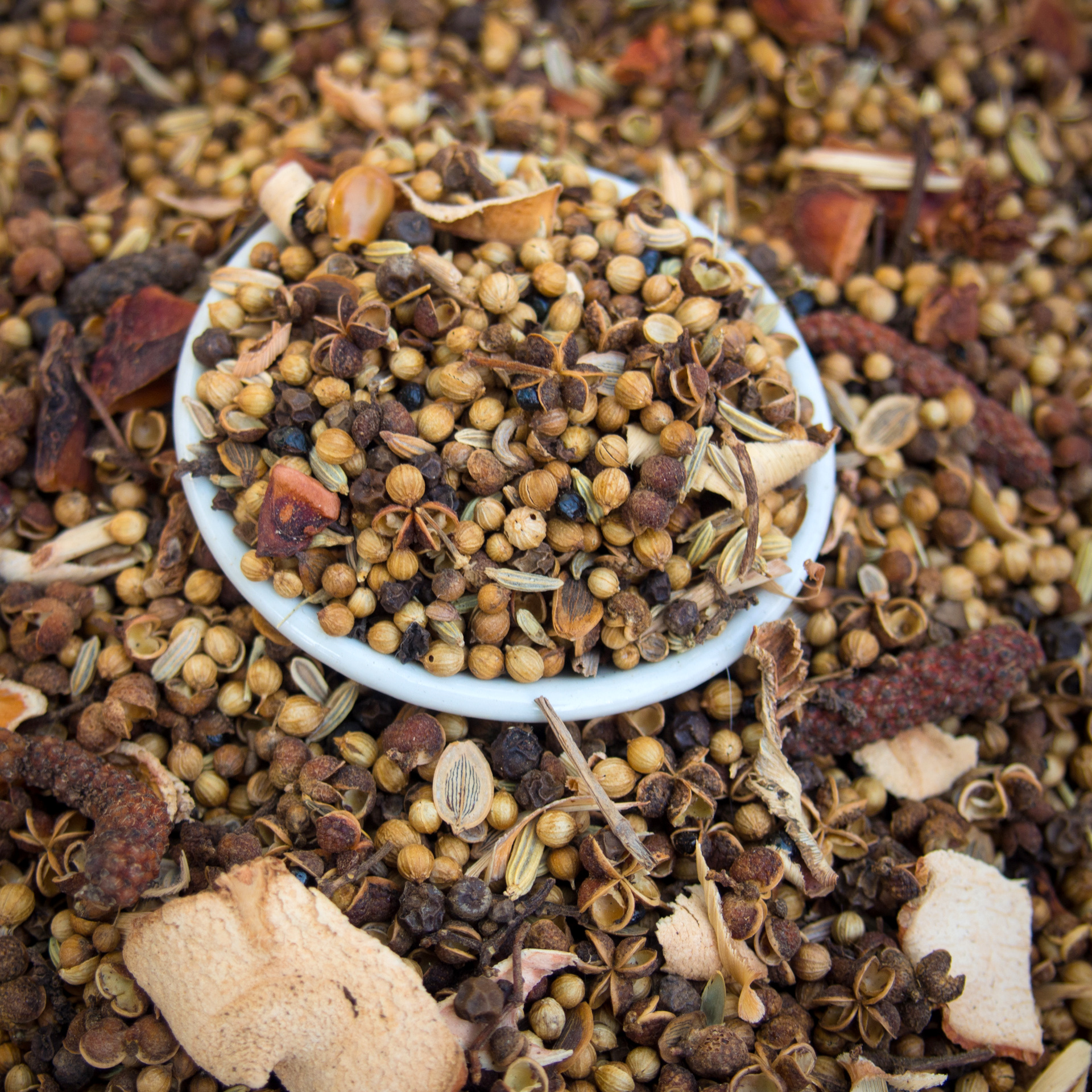
The elaborate spice mix needed for northern Thai larb

Other typical ingredients are the several types of eggplant (makhuea) used in Thai cuisine, such as the pea-sized makhuea phuang and the egg-sized makhuea suai, often also eaten raw. Although broccoli is often used in Asian restaurants in the west in phat phak ruam (stir fried mixed vegetables) and rat na (rice noodles served in gravy), it was never used in any traditional Thai food in Thailand and was rarely seen in Thailand. Usually in Thailand, khana is used, for which broccoli is a substitute. Other vegetables which are often eaten in Thailand are thua fak yao (yardlong beans), thua ngok (bean sprouts), no mai (bamboo shoots), tomatoes, cucumbers, phak tam lueng (Coccinia grandis), phak kha na (Chinese kale), phak kwangtung (choy sum), sweet potatoes (both the tuber and leaves), a few types of squash, phak krathin (Leucaena leucocephala), sato (Parkia speciosa), tua phū (winged beans) and khaophot (corn).

Among the green, leafy vegetables and herbs that are usually eaten raw in a meal or as a side dish in Thailand, the most important are: phak bung (morning glory), horapha (Thai basil), bai bua bok (Asian pennywort), phak kachet (water mimosa), phak kat khao (Chinese cabbage), phak phai (praew leaves), phak kayang (rice paddy herb), phak chi farang (culantro), phak tiu (Cratoxylum formosum), phak "phaai" (yellow burr head) and kalamplī (cabbage). Some of these leaves are highly perishable and must be used within a couple of days.

Several types of mushroom (het) also feature in Thai cuisine such as straw mushrooms (het fang), shiitake (het hom), and white jelly fungus (het hu nu khao).

Flowers are also commonly used ingredients in many Thai dishes, either as a vegetable, such as dok khae (Sesbania grandiflora) and huapli (the flower bud of the banana), or as a food coloring, such as with the blue-colored dok anchan (the flowers of the Clitoria ternatea, which can also be eaten raw or fried).

=== Fruits ===
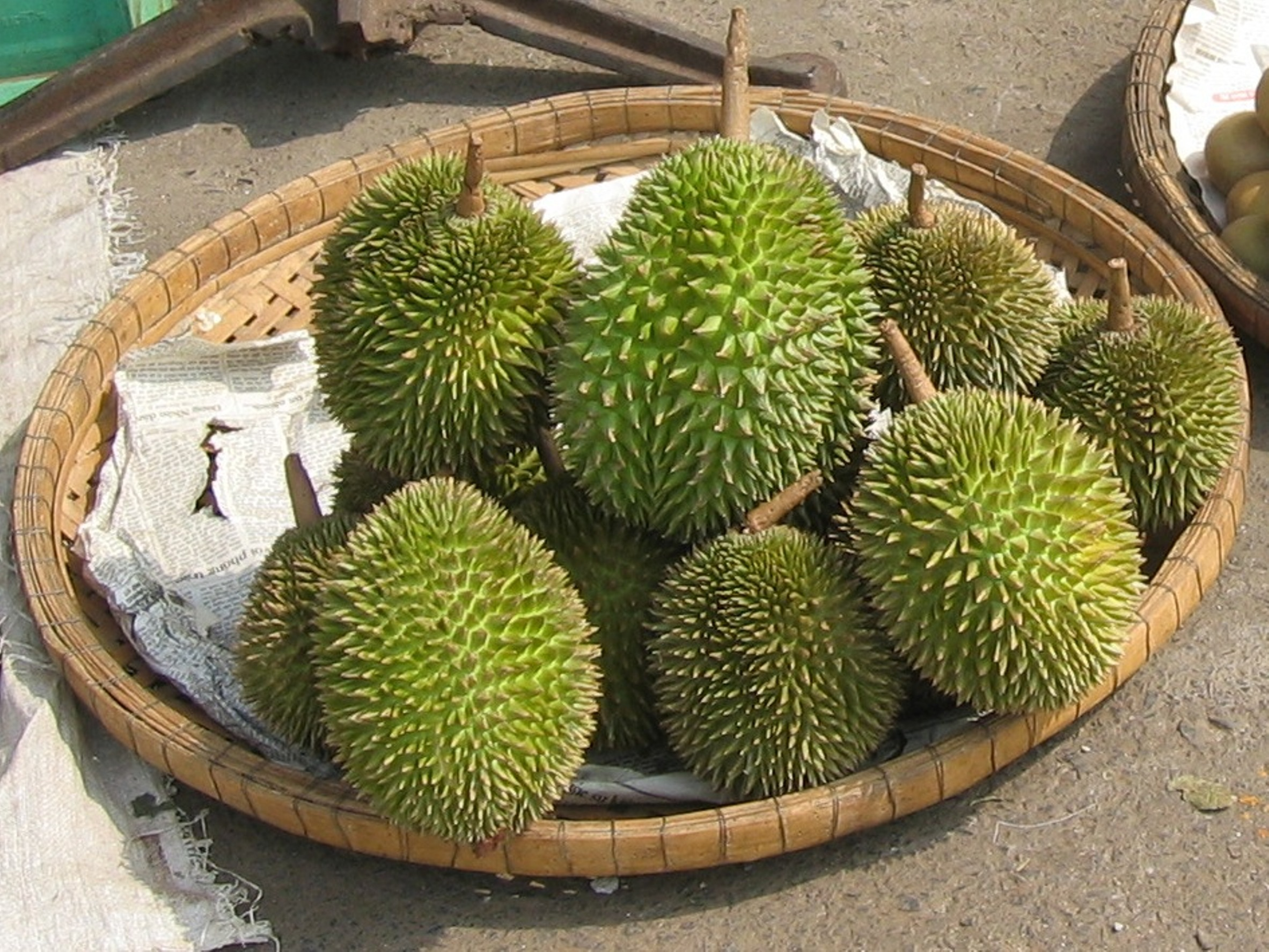
Durians at a Thai market

Fresh fruit forms a large part of the Thai diet, and is customarily served after a meal as dessert. The Scottish author John Crawfurd, sent on an embassy to Bangkok in 1822, writes in his account of the journey:

"The fruits of Siam, or at least of the neighbourhood of Bangkok, are excellent and various, surpassing, according to the experience of our party (...) those of all other parts of India." The Siamese themselves consume great quantities of fruit, and the whole neighbourhood of Bangkok is one forest of fruit trees.

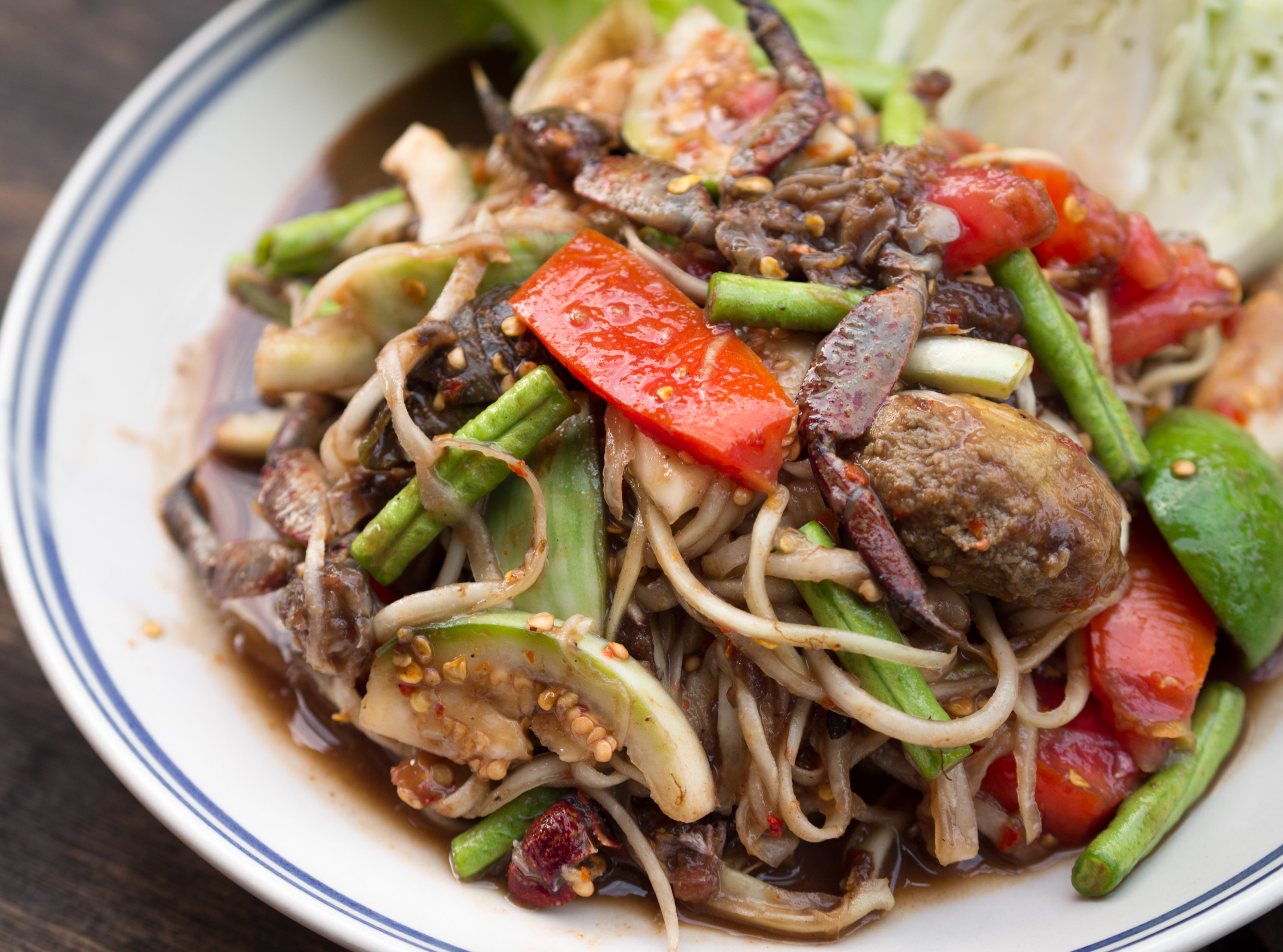
Green papaya salad

Fruit is not only eaten on its own, but often served with spicy dips made from sugar, salt, and chilies. Fruits feature in spicy salads such as som tam (green papaya salad) and yam som-o (pomelo salad), in soups with tamarind juice such as tom khlong and kaeng som, and in Thai curries such as kaeng khanun (jackfruit curry), kaeng phet pet yang (grilled duck curry with pineapple or grapes), and kaeng pla sapparot (fish and pineapple curry). Fruits are also used in certain Thai chili pastes, such as in nam phrik long rue made with madan (a close relative of the mangosteen), and nam phrik luk namliap, salted black Chinese olive chilli paste.

Although many of the exotic fruits of Thailand may have been sometimes unavailable in Western countries, Asian markets now import such fruits as rambutan and lychees. In Thailand one can find papaya, jackfruit, mango, mangosteen, langsat, longan, pomelo, pineapple, rose apples, durian, Burmese grapes and other native fruits. Chanthaburi in Thailand each year holds the World Durian Festival in early May. This single province is responsible for half of the durian production of Thailand and a quarter of the world production. The Langsat Festival is held each year in Uttaradit on weekends in September. The langsat (Lansium parasiticum), for which Uttaradit is famous, is a fruit that is similar in taste to the longan.

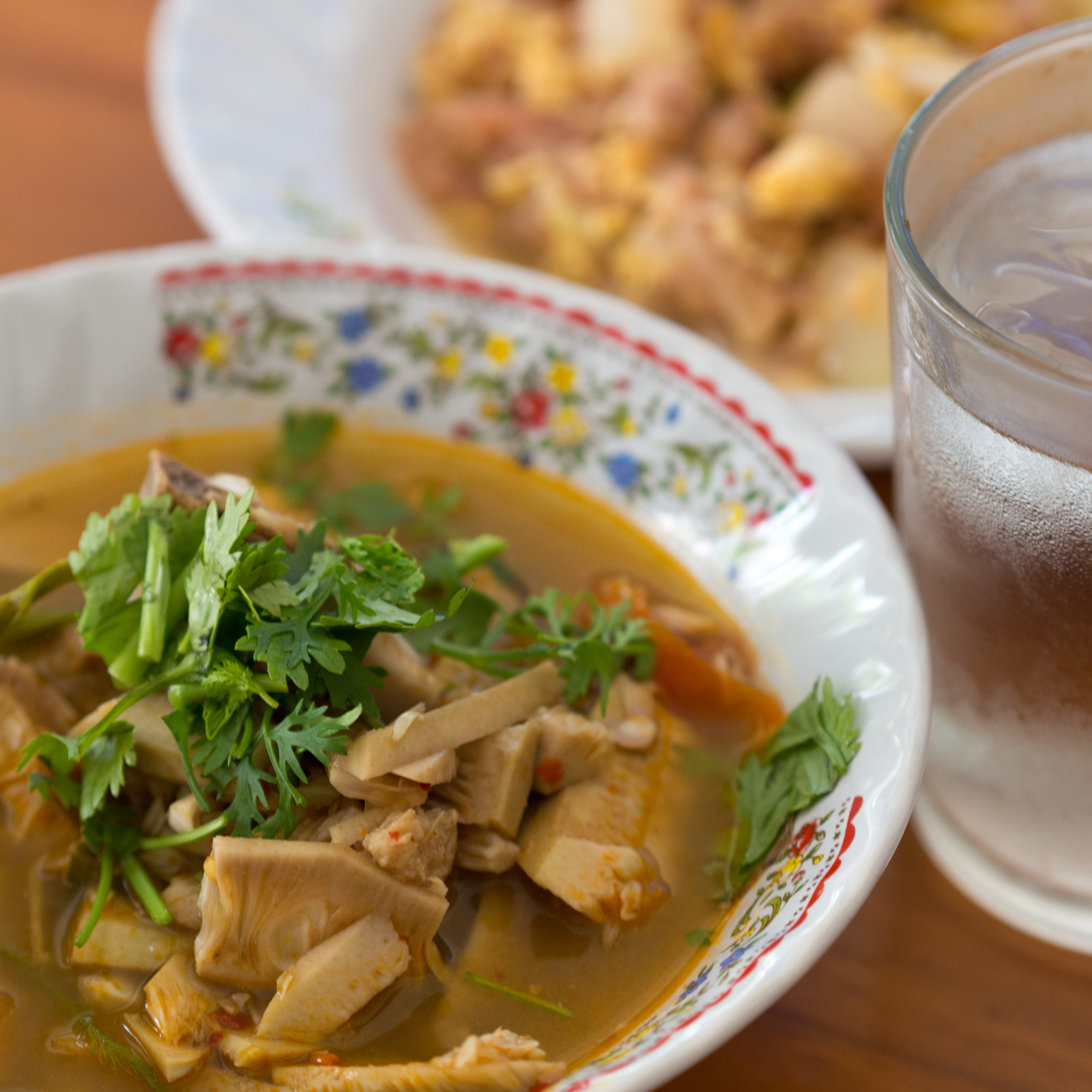
Kaeng kanun, a northern Thai curry made with jackfruit

From the coconut comes coconut milk, used both in curries and desserts, and coconut oil. The juice of a green coconut can be served as a drink and the young flesh is eaten in either sweet or savory dishes. The grated flesh of a mature coconut is used raw or toasted in sweets, salads and snacks such as miang kham. Thais not only consume products derived from the nut (actually a drupe), but they also make use of the growth bud of the palm tree as a vegetable. From the stalk of the flowers comes a sap that can be used to make coconut vinegar, alcoholic beverages, and sugar. Coconut milk and other coconut-derived ingredients feature heavily in the cuisines of central and southern Thailand. In contrast to these regions, coconut palms do not grow as well in northern and northeastern Thailand, where in wintertime the temperatures are lower and where there is a dry season that can last five to six months. In northern Thai cuisine, only a few dishes, most notably the noodle soup khao soi, use coconut milk. In the southern parts of northeastern Thailand, where the region borders Cambodia, one can again find dishes containing coconut. It is also here that the people eat non-glutinous rice, just as in central and southern Thailand, and not glutinous rice as they do in northern Thailand and in the rest of northeastern Thailand.

Apples, pears, peaches, grapes, and strawberries, which do not traditionally grow in Thailand and in the past had to be imported, have become increasingly popular in the last few decades since they were introduced to Thai farmers by the Thai Royal Projects, starting in 1969, and the Doi Tung Project since 1988. These temperate fruit grow especially well in the cooler, northern Thai highlands, where they were initially introduced as a replacement for the cultivation of opium, together with other crops such as cabbages, tea, and arabica coffee.

=== Food controversies ===
==== Agricultural chemicals ====
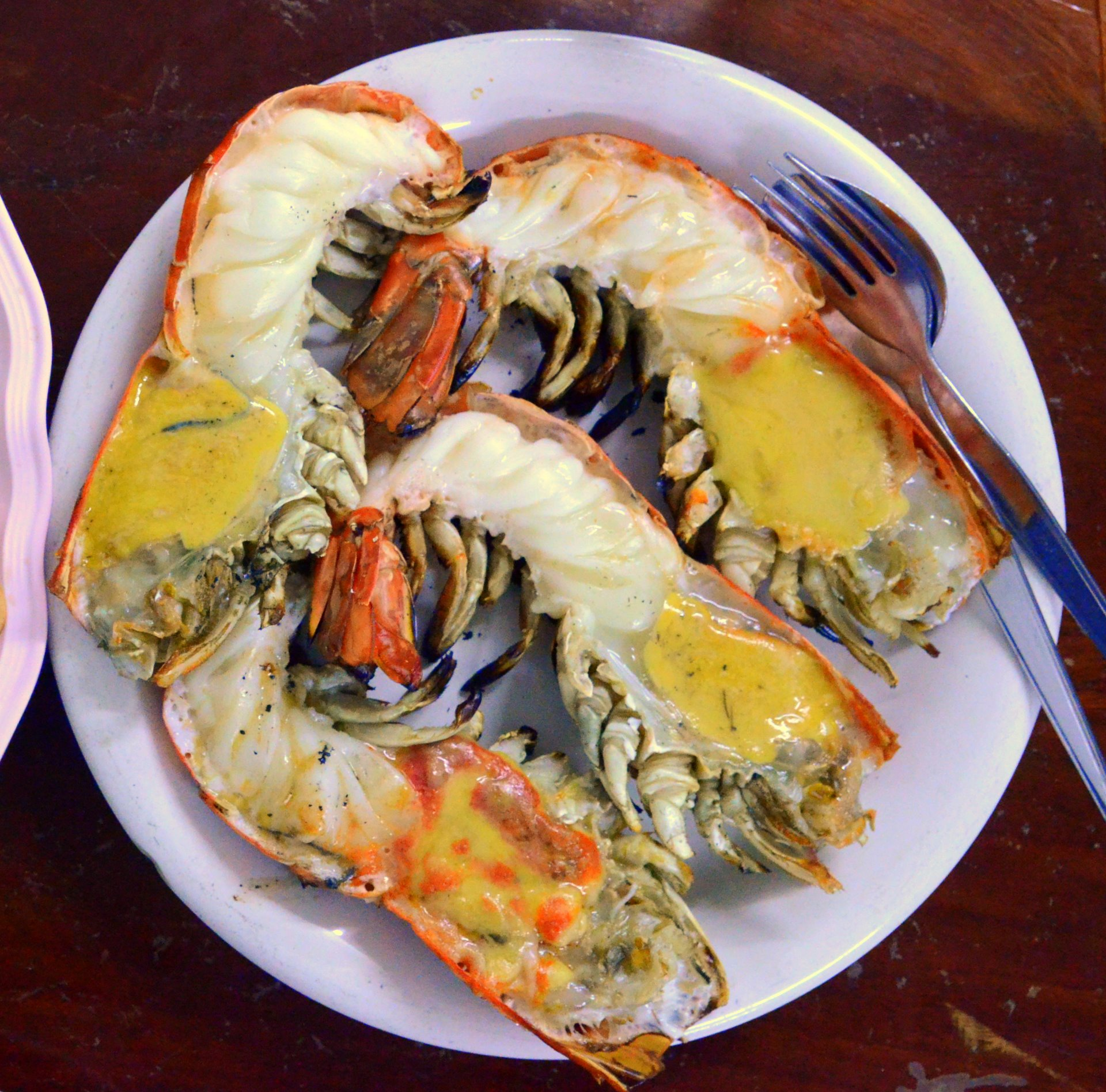
Kung phao, grilled prawns, made with the giant river prawns that are native to the rivers of central Thailand

According to the Thai government's The Eleventh National Economic and Social Development Plan (2012–2016), Thailand is number one in the world in the application of chemicals in agriculture. The report stated that, "The use of chemicals in the agricultural and industrial sectors is growing while control mechanisms are ineffective making Thailand rank first in the world in the use of registered chemicals in agriculture."

The Thai Pesticide Alert Network (ThaiPAN), a food safety advocacy group, annually tests Thai farm produce for contamination. In their June 2019 report, the group found that of 286 samples, 41% of produce was found to contain unsafe levels of chemicals. The group surveyed both wet markets and retail stores across the nation. Contaminants were found in 44% of samples from retail stores, and 39% of samples from wet markets. Vegetables with the highest levels of contamination were Chinese mustard greens, kale, hot basil, parsley, chilis, and cauliflower. Fruits with the highest contamination were tangerines, rose apples, guavas, and grapes. Contamination levels decreased from 2018, when 46% of samples were found to be contaminated, and 2016, when more than 50% of tested produce was found to be unsafe.

In prior years, "Q-Mark" goods showed a higher prevalence of contamination, 61.5%, than they did during ThaiPAN's March 2016 survey, 57%. Q-Mark is Thailand's National Bureau of Agricultural Commodity and Food Standards (ACFS) mark of quality.

In a survey of hydroponically-grown vegetables, ThaiPAN, in late-2017, tested 30 hydroponic vegetables purchased at Thai fresh markets and supermarkets. Of 30 vegetables tested, 19 contained noxious chemical levels above maximum limits. Three samples were contaminated, but at levels below the legal maximum. Eight samples were free of harmful chemicals.

On 22 October 2019, the 26-member National Hazardous Substances Committee (NHSC) changed paraquat, glyphosate, and chlorpyrifos from Type 3 toxic substances to Type 4, effectively prohibiting their production, import, export, or possession. Their use will be prohibited as of 1 December 2019. On 27 November 2019, the NHSC amended that timetable, moving the date for the ban of paraquat and chlorpyrifos to 1 June 2020. They lifted the ban on glyphosate with restrictions on usage: glyphosate will be used only on six major crops: corn, cassava, sugarcane, rubber, oil palms, and fruit. It is not permitted in watershed areas and other sensitive environment zones, and farmers must submit proof of use including the type of crops and the size of their farms when purchasing glyphosate. Industry Minister Suriya Jungrungreangkit, who chairs the NHSC, said the committee reached its decision after reviewing information provided by the Department of Agriculture and the Ministry of Public Health. NCHS member Jirapon Limpananon, chair of the Pharmacy Council of Thailand, announced her resignation from the NCHS Wednesday night following the meeting.

==== Misrepresentation ====
- In September 2016, a shipment of pork labelled "halal"—a permissible food for Muslims—was delivered to a hotel in Krabi Province. The Central Islamic Committee of Thailand (CICOT) denounced the use of a halal-certified logo on pork, saying it will take legal action against people responsible. The committee found the halal label to be fake. Under Thai laws, CICOT is responsible for certifying halal products.
- A survey of the quality of fish sauce sold across Thailand reported that just over one-third of the samples were not up to standards set by the Public Health Ministry. The three-year survey, from 2012 to 2015, involved 1,121 samples of fish sauce sold under 422 brands from 245 manufacturers. Of the total analysed, 410 samples, or 36.5 percent, did not meet the standard. The major reasons for the substandard fish sauce were low nitrogen readings and the ratio of glutamic acid to nitrogen either higher or lower than the required standards.

== Representative dishes ==
Whereas many Thai dishes are now familiar in the West, the vast majority are not. In many of the dishes below, different kinds of protein, or combinations of protein, are interchangeable as the main ingredient. Beef (nuea), chicken (kai), pork (mu), duck (pet), tofu (taohu), fish (pla), prawns or shrimp (kung), crab (pu), shellfish (hoi), or egg (khai) can, for example, all be used as main ingredients for kaeng phet (red curry). Thus kaeng phet kai is red curry with chicken and kaeng phet mu is red curry made with pork.

=== Breakfast dishes ===
Khao chao (Thai: ข้าวเช้า; lit. 'morning rice/food'), breakfast dishes, for Thais are limited. Very often, a Thai breakfast can consist of the same dishes with rice which are also eaten for lunch or dinner. Single dishes such as fried rice, noodle soups, and steamed rice with something simple such as an omelette, fried/grilled pork or chicken, or a stir fry with vegetables, are commonly sold for breakfast from street stalls as a quick take-out.

The following dishes are viewed as being specific breakfast dishes but they can also be found at any other moment of the day:

- Chok – a rice porridge commonly eaten in Thailand for breakfast. Similar to the rice congee eaten in other parts of Asia.
- Khao khai chiao – an omelet (khai chiao) with white rice, often eaten with a chili sauce and slices of cucumber.
- Khao tom – a Thai style rice soup, usually with pork, chicken, fish, or shrimp.
- Pathongko – The Thai version of the Chinese deep-fried bread called youtiao. It can be topped up with spreads such as sangkhaya or with chocolate and sweetened condensed milk.
- Nam taohu – Soy milk which is often served with sweet jellies.

=== Individual dishes ===
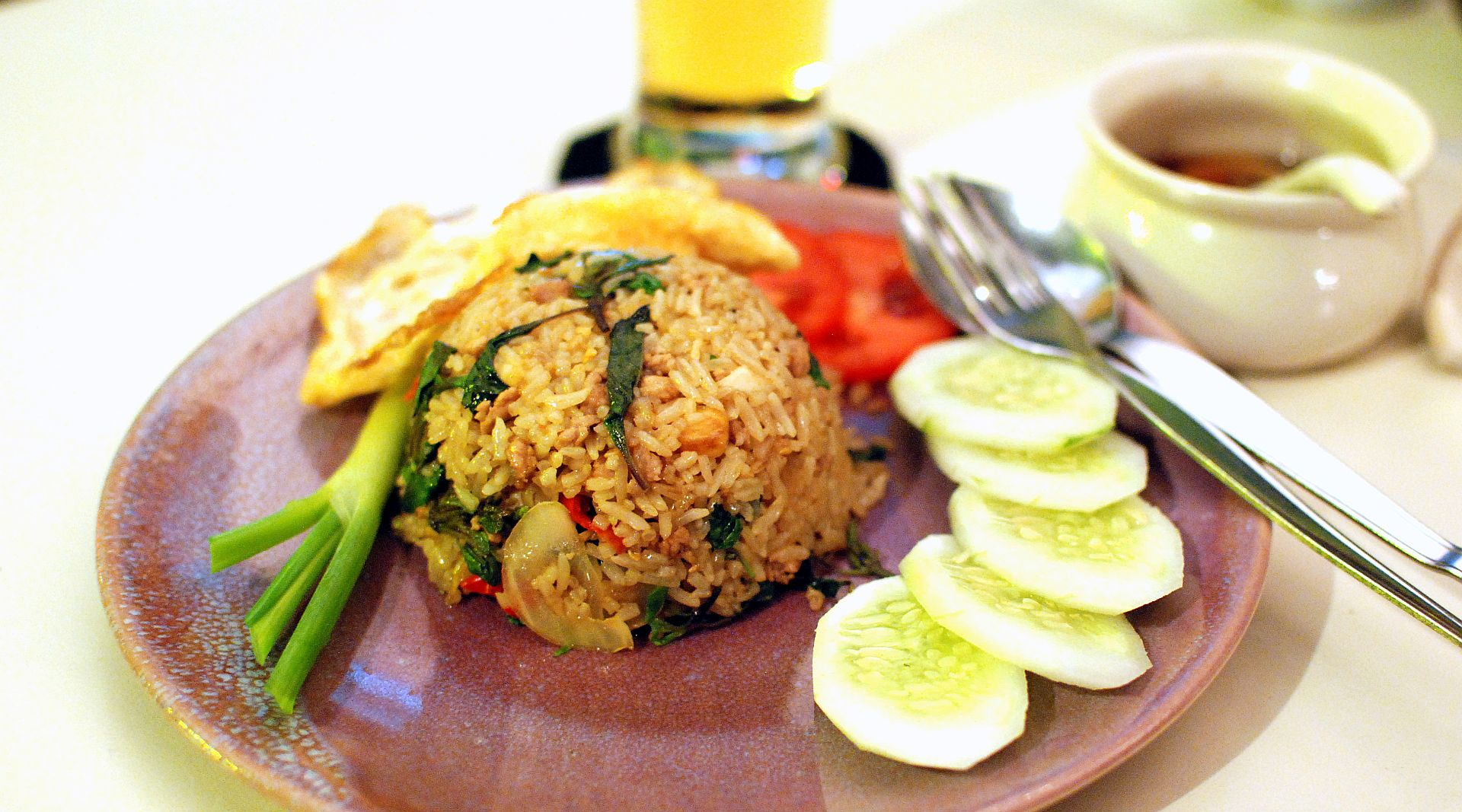
Khao phat

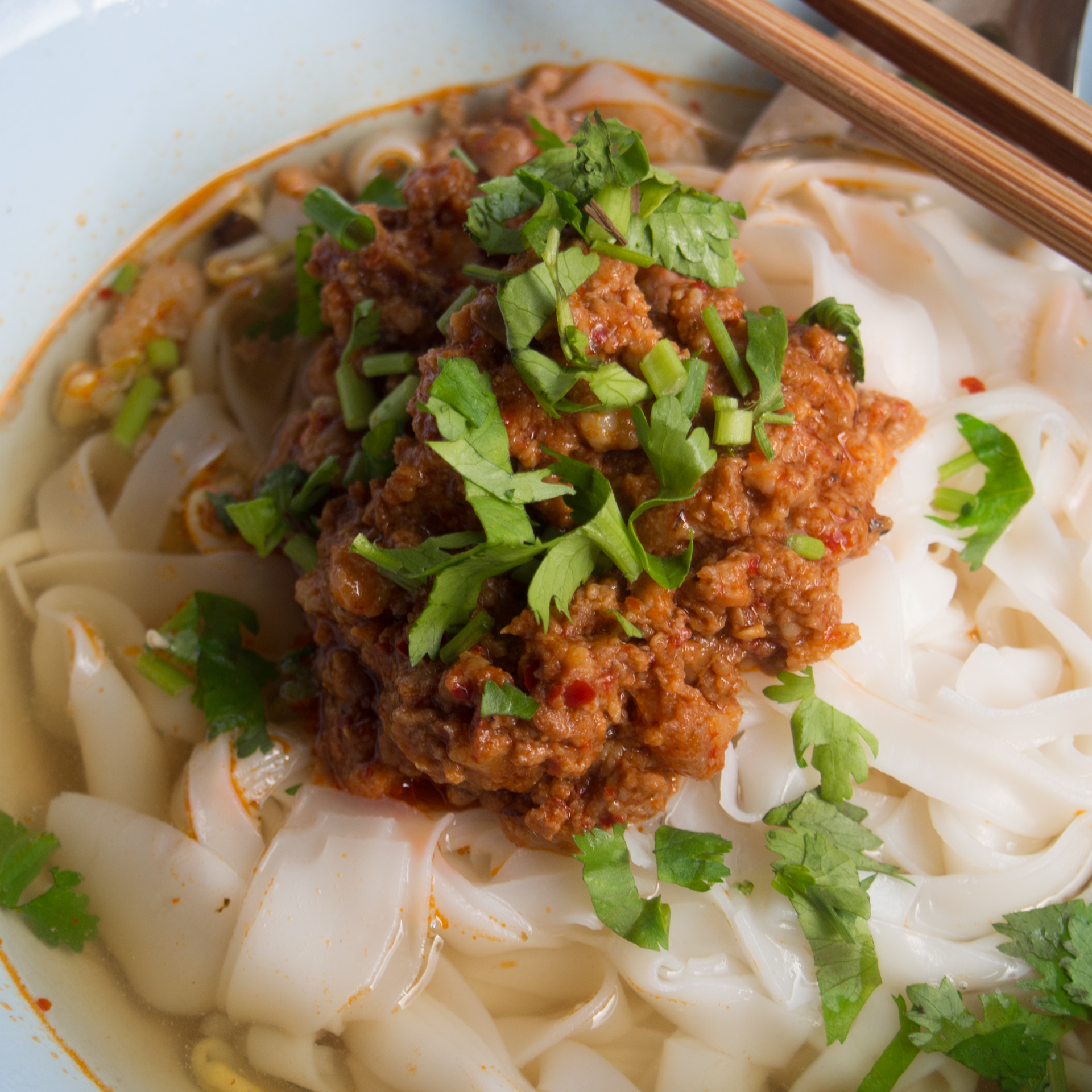
Khao soi nam na

The term ahan chan diao (Thai: อาหารจานเดียว; lit. 'single dish food') represents truly single-plate dishes as well as dishes that are served "rat khao" (lit. 'poured on rice'): one or more dishes served together with rice on one plate. Some eateries offer a large selection of (pre-cooked) dishes; others specialize in only one dish, or a few dishes, with rice.

- Phat kaphrao mu rat khao – minced pork fried with chilies, garlic, soy sauce and holy basil, served together with rice, and with nam pla phrik as a condiment.
- Khanom chin kaeng kiao wan kai – fresh Thai rice noodles (khanom chin) served in a bowl with green chicken curry as a sauce. Raw vegetables, herbs, and fish sauce are served on the side and can be added to taste.
- Khanom chin nam ngiao – A specialty of northern Thailand, it is Thai fermented rice noodles served with pork blood tofu and raw vegetables, in a sauce made with pork broth and tomato, crushed fried dry chilies, chicken blood, dry fermented soy bean, and dried red kapok flowers.
- Khanom chin namya – round boiled rice noodles topped with a fish-based sauce and eaten with fresh leaves and vegetables.
- Khao kha mu – steamed rice served with red-cooked pork leg, steamed mustard greens, pickled cabbage, sweet-sour chili sauce, raw garlic, fresh bird's eye chilies, and boiled egg.
- Khao khluk kapi – rice stir-fried with shrimp paste, served with sweetened pork and vegetables.
- Khao man kai – rice steamed in chicken stock with garlic, with boiled chicken, chicken stock, and a spicy dipping sauce. It is usually served with a bowl of radish soup, or nam kaeng hua chai thao.
- Khao mu daeng – slices of Thai-style Chinese char siu are served with rice, sliced cucumber, and a thickened gravy. This often comes with a bowl of broth and a few raw scallions. Thick, black soy sauce with sliced chilies is used as a condiment.
- Khao na pet – rice served with slices of red-roast duck, sliced cucumber, and a thickened gravy. It is served with the same spicy soy sauce condiment as khao mu daeng and also often comes with a bowl of soup and additional raw scallions.
- Khao phat – One of the most common rice dishes in Thailand. Usually with chicken, beef, shrimp, pork, crab, coconut or pineapple, or vegetarian (che; Thai: เจ).
  - Khao phat American – although devised in Thailand, it is called "American-style" fried rice because the rice is fried with tomato ketchup, may contain raisins, and is served with a fried egg, hot dogs, and bacon, which were all viewed as being typically American ingredients.
  - Khao phat kai – fried rice with chicken.
  - Khao phat mu – fried rice with pork.
  - Khao phat pu – fried rice with crab meat.
  - Khao phat kung – fried rice with shrimp.
  - Khao phat naem – fried rice with fermented sausage (naem, a typical sausage from the northeast; it is similar to the Vietnamese nem chua).
- Khao soi – curried noodle soup enriched with coconut milk (traditionally a novel ingredient in the cooking traditions of northern Thailand), garnished with crispy fried wheat noodles, and served with pickled cabbage, lime, a chili paste, and raw shallots on the side. Arguably Chiang Mai's most iconic dish, it was originally a dish of the Chin Haw, Chinese-Muslim traders from Yunnan Province in China.

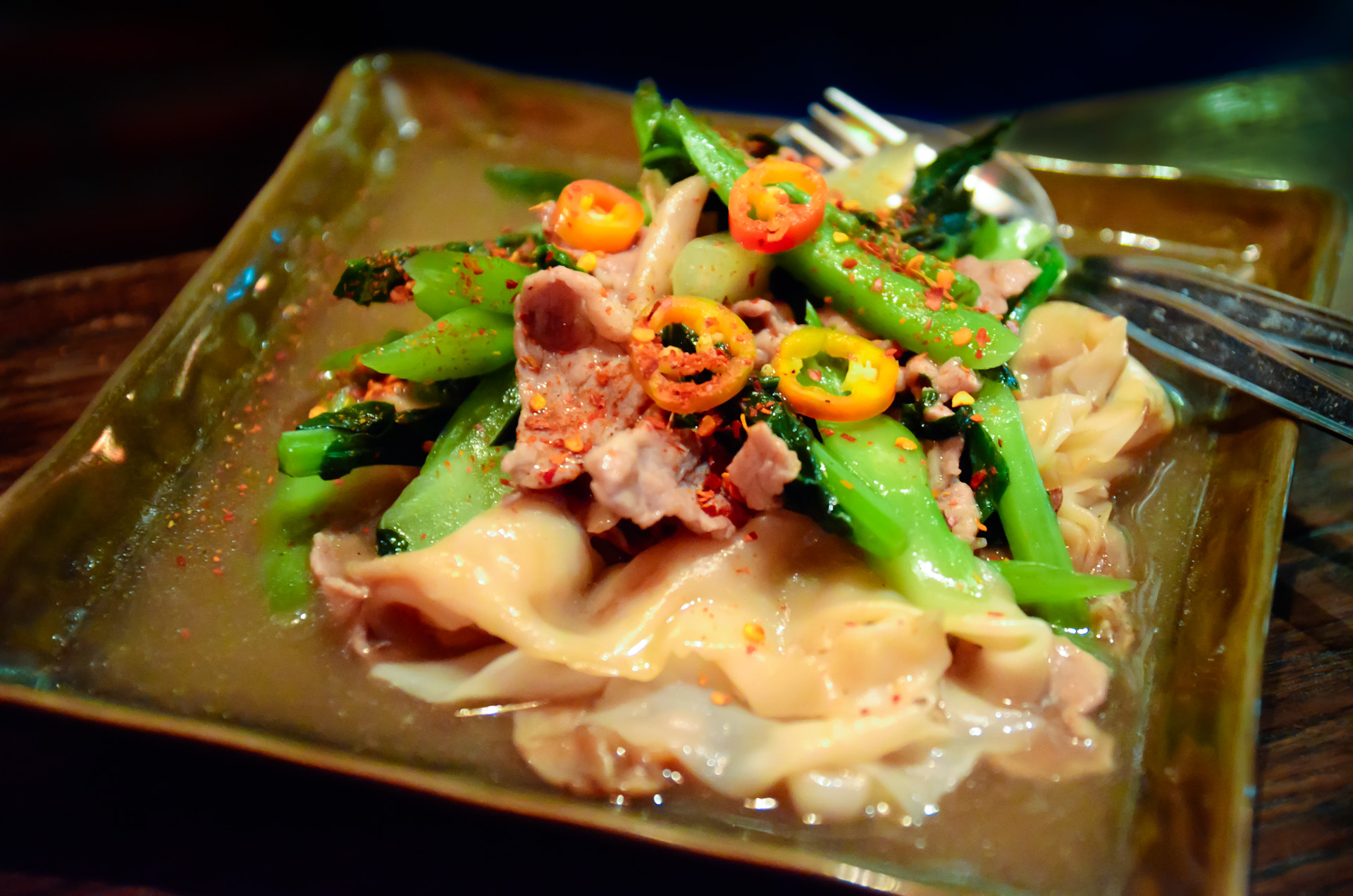
Kuaitiao rat na

- Kuaitiao nam and bami nam – noodle soup that can be eaten at any time of day; served with many combinations of proteins, vegetables, and spicy condiments. The word kuaitiao, although originally designating only sen yai (wide rice noodles), is now used colloquially for rice noodles in general: sen mi (rice vermicelli), sen lek (narrow rice noodles) and the aforementioned sen yai. The yellow egg noodles are called bami. Four condiments are usually provided on the table: sugar, fish sauce, chili flakes, and sliced chilies in vinegar.
  - Kuaitiao lukchin pla – noodle soup with fish balls.
  - Bami mu daeng – egg noodles with Thai-style char siu.
- Kuaitiao rat na – wide rice noodles covered in a gravy, with beef, pork, chicken, shrimp, or seafood.
- Kuaitiao ruea – also known as boat noodles in English, it is a rice noodle dish, which has a strong flavor. It contains both pork and beef, as well as dark soy sauce, pickled bean curd, and other spices, and is normally served with meatballs and pig's liver.
- Mi krop – deep-fried rice vermicelli with a sweet and sour sauce.
- Phat khi mao – noodles stir-fried with chilies and holy basil.
- Phat si-io – rice noodles (often kuai tiao) stir-fried with si-io dam (thick sweet soy sauce) and nam pla (fish sauce) and pork or chicken.
- Pad thai – rice noodles pan-fried with fish sauce, sugar, lime juice or tamarind pulp, chopped peanuts, and egg, combined with chicken, seafood, or tofu. It is listed at number five on the World's 50 most delicious foods readers' poll compiled by CNNGo in 2011.

=== Bangkok shared dishes ===
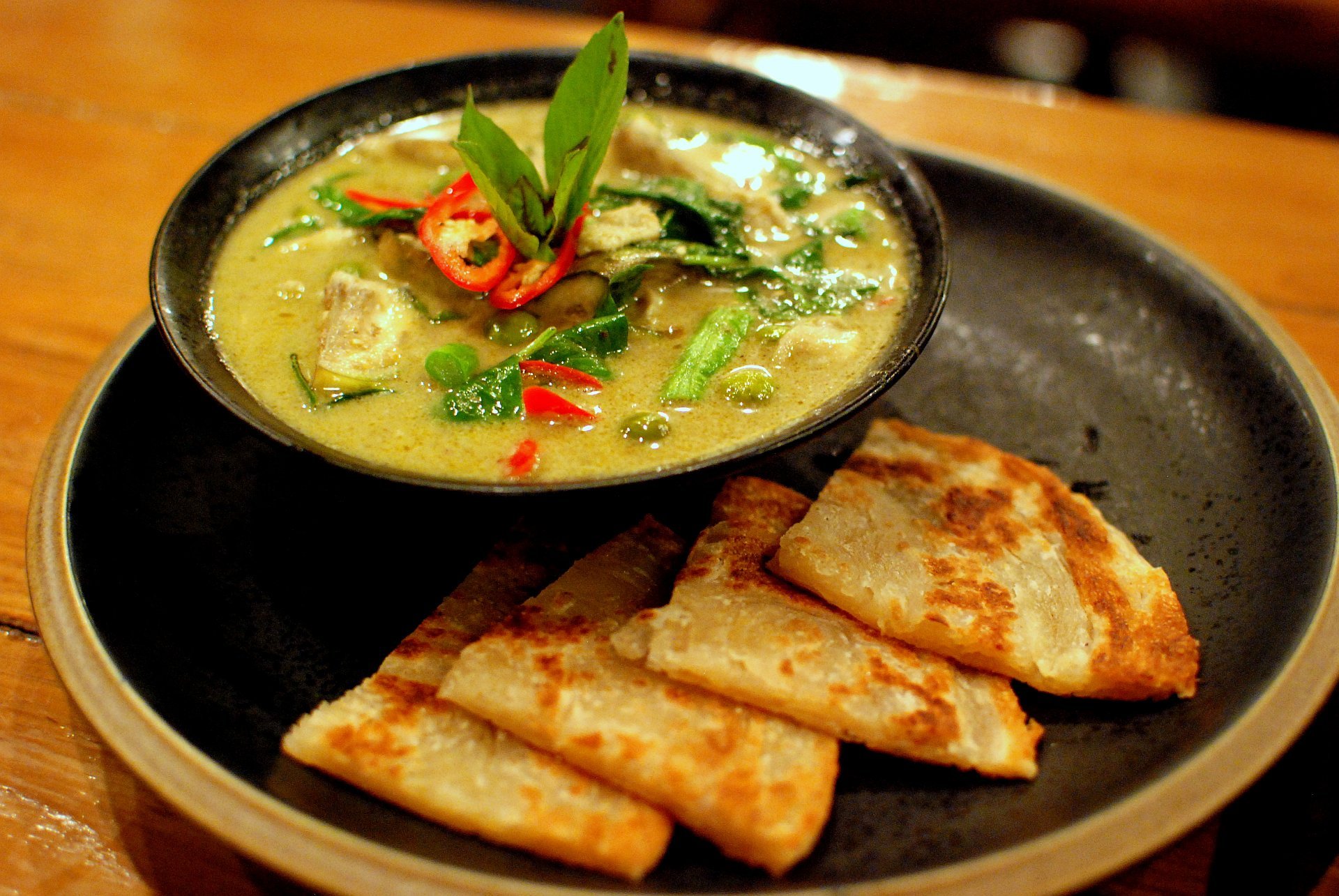
Kaeng khiao wan or green curry with chicken, served with roti.

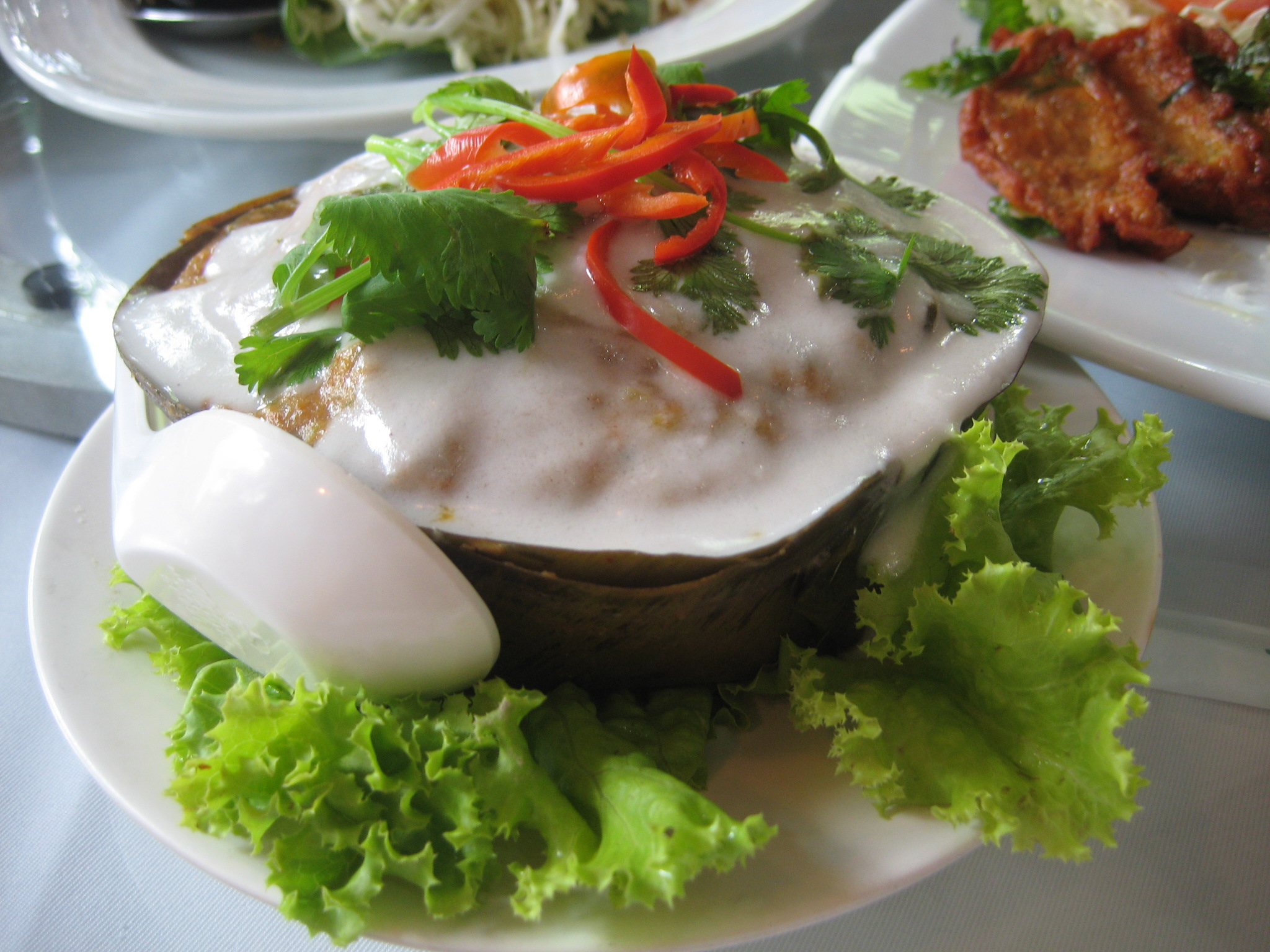
Ho mok pla can be likened to a fish curry pâté.

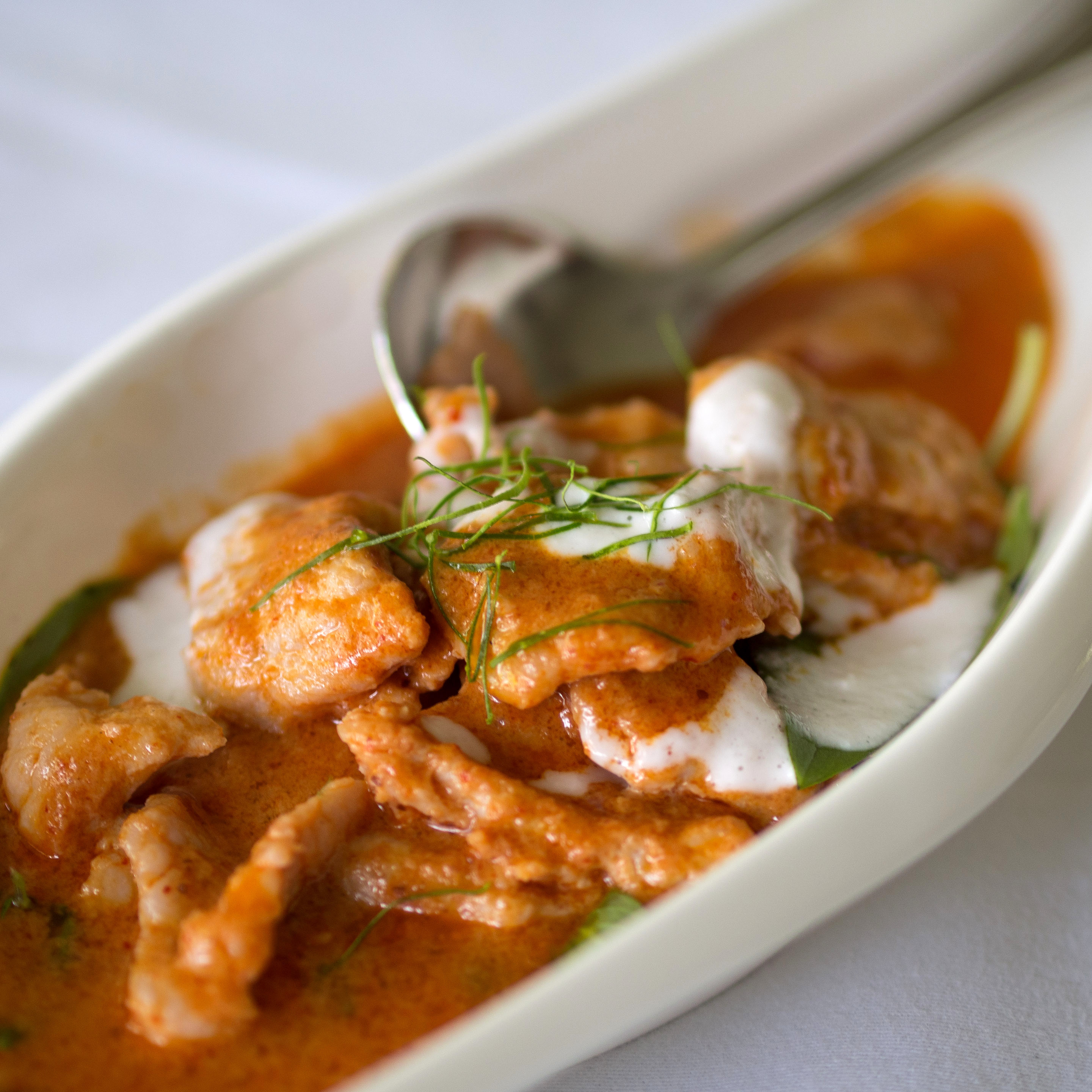
Kaeng phanaeng or Phanaeng curry.

Ahan Krung Thep (Thai: อาหารกรุงเทพ; lit. 'Bangkok food'), the cuisine has also incorporated many Thai Chinese dishes.

- Kai phat khing – chicken stir fried with sliced ginger.
- Kaeng khiao wan – called "green curry" in English, it is a coconut curry made with fresh green chillies and flavoured with Thai basil, and chicken or fish meatballs. This dish can be one of the spiciest Thai curries.
- Kaeng phanaeng – a mild creamy coconut curry with beef (phanaeng nuea), chicken, or pork. It includes roasted dried spices similar to kaeng matsaman.
- Kaeng phet (lit. 'spicy curry') – also known as red curry in English, it is a coconut curry made with copious amounts of dried red chillies in the curry paste.
- Kaeng som – a hot and sour soup or curry usually eaten together with rice
- Kai phat met mamuang himmaphan – The Thai Chinese version of the Sichuan-style chicken with cashews known as cashew chicken, fried with whole dried chilies.
- Phak bung fai daeng – stir-fried morning glory with yellow bean paste.
- Phat phak ruam – stir-fried combination of vegetables depending on availability and preference.
- Phat phrik – often eaten as nuea phat phrik; beef stir-fried with chilli.
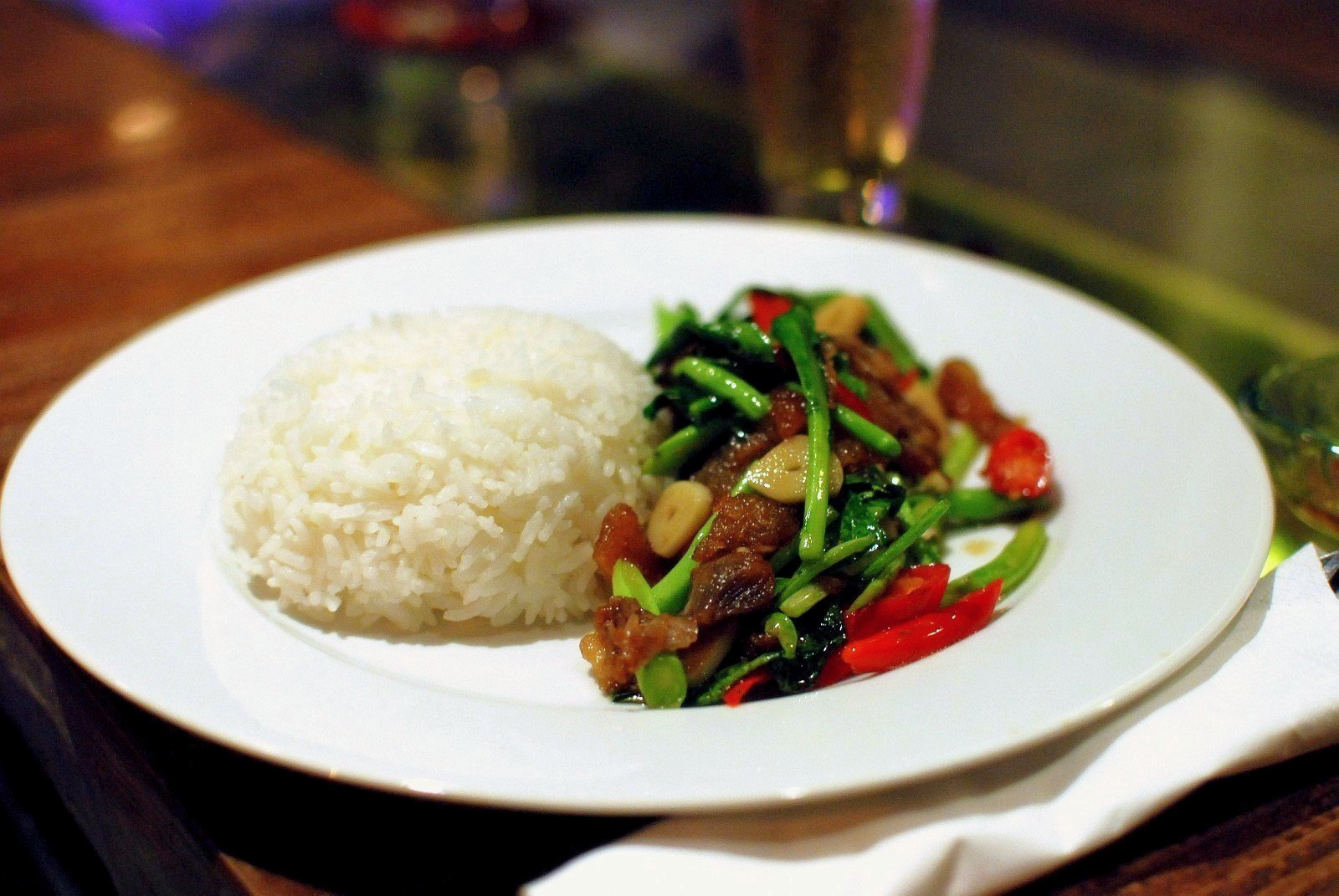
- Pak kanaa moo krob
  Phat khana mu krop – khana (gailan) stir-fried with crispy pork.
- Phat kaphrao – beef, pork, prawns, or chicken stir-fried with Thai holy basil, chillies, garlic, and soy sauce; for instance, mu phat kaphrao /kaphrao mu with minced pork.
- Suki – a Thai variant of the Chinese hot pot.
- Thot man – deep-fried fishcake made from knifefish (thot man pla krai) or shrimp (thot man kung).
- Tom chuet or kaeng chuet – a clear soup with vegetables and, for instance, wunsen (cellophane noodles), taohu (silken tofu), mu sap (minced pork), or het (mushrooms). It is of Thai Chinese origin.
- Tom kha kai – hot spicy soup with coconut milk, galangal, and chicken.
- Tom yam – hot and sour soup with meat. With shrimp it is called tom yam goong or tom yam kung, with seafood (typically shrimp, squid, fish) tom yam thale, with chicken tom yam kai.

=== Central Thai shared dishes ===
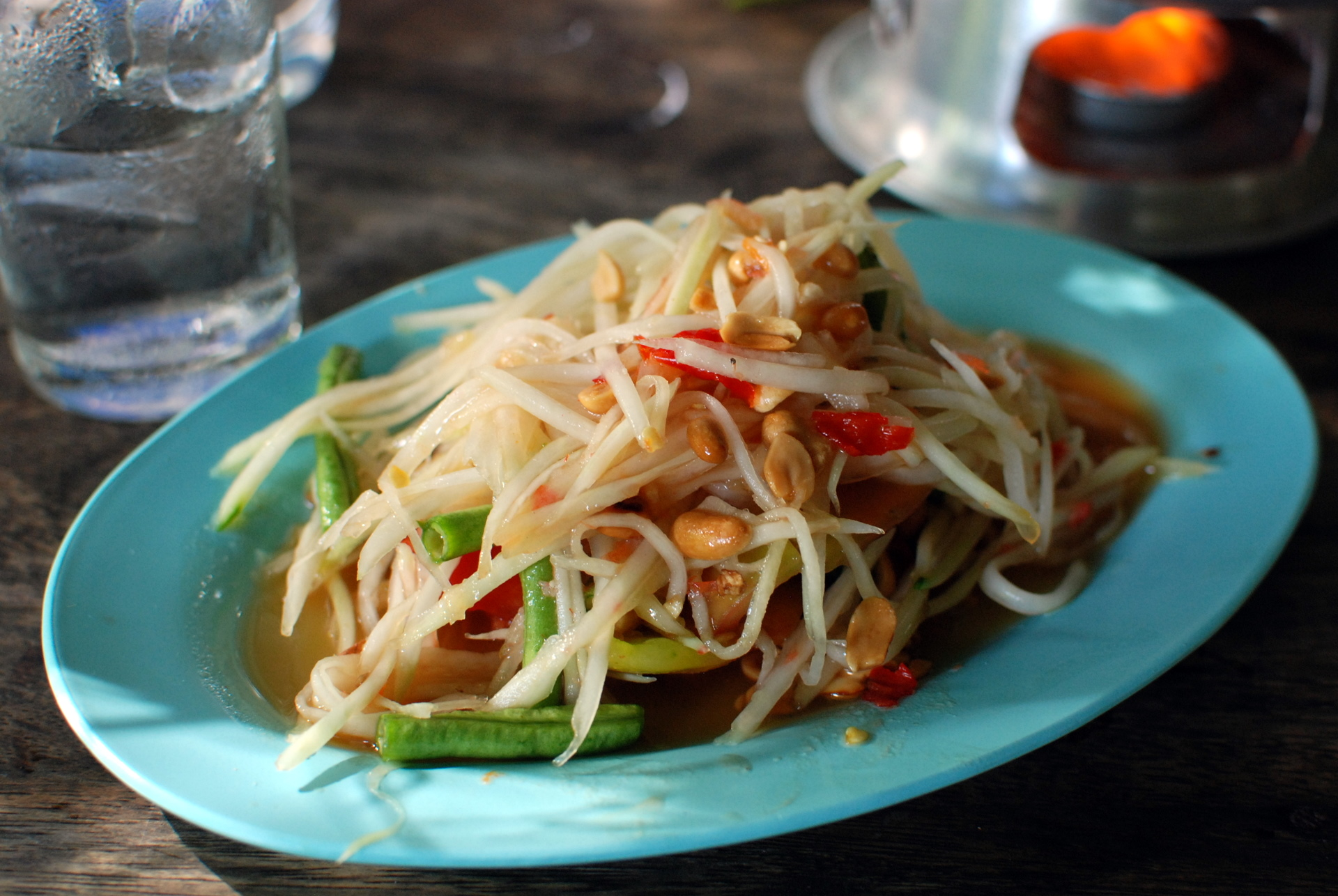
Som tam, which contains peanuts, is the Central Thai dish that became famous internationally

Ahan Phak Klang (Thai: อาหารภาคกลาง; lit. 'central region food') is most often eaten with the non-glutinous jasmine rice. Due to the extensive, centuries-long contact between Ayutthaya Kingdom and Khmer Empire, the flavour principles of many Central Thai dishes, such as sour fish soups, stews and coconut-based curries, including steamed curries, are almost identical to that of Cambodian cuisine, with the notable exception of Central Thai dishes containing much more chilli and sugar.

- Chuchi pla kaphong – snapper in chuchi curry sauce (thick red curry sauce)
- Ho mok pla – a pâté or soufflé of fish, spices, coconut milk and egg, steamed in a banana leaf cup and topped with thick coconut cream before serving.
- Pla nueng manao – steamed fish with a spicy lime juice dressing.
- Pla sam rot – literally, 'three flavours fish': deep fried fish with a sweet, tangy and spicy tamarind sauce.
- Pu cha – a mixture of cooked crab meat, pork, garlic and pepper, deep fried inside the crab shells and served with a simple spicy sauce, such as Sriracha sauce, sweet-hot garlic sauce, nam phrik phao (roasted chilli paste), nam chim buai (plum sauce), or in a red curry paste, with chopped green onions. It is sometimes also served as deep fried patties instead of being fried in the crab shell.
- Som tam – grated green papaya salad, pounded with a mortar and pestle, similar to the Laotian and Isan Tam mak hoong. There are three main variations: Som tam with peanuts, dried shrimp and palm sugar, Som tam pu with pickled rice-paddy crab, and Som tam pla ra with salted gourami fish, white eggplants, fish sauce and long beans. Som tam is usually eaten with sticky rice but a popular variation is to serve it with Khanom chin (rice noodles) instead.

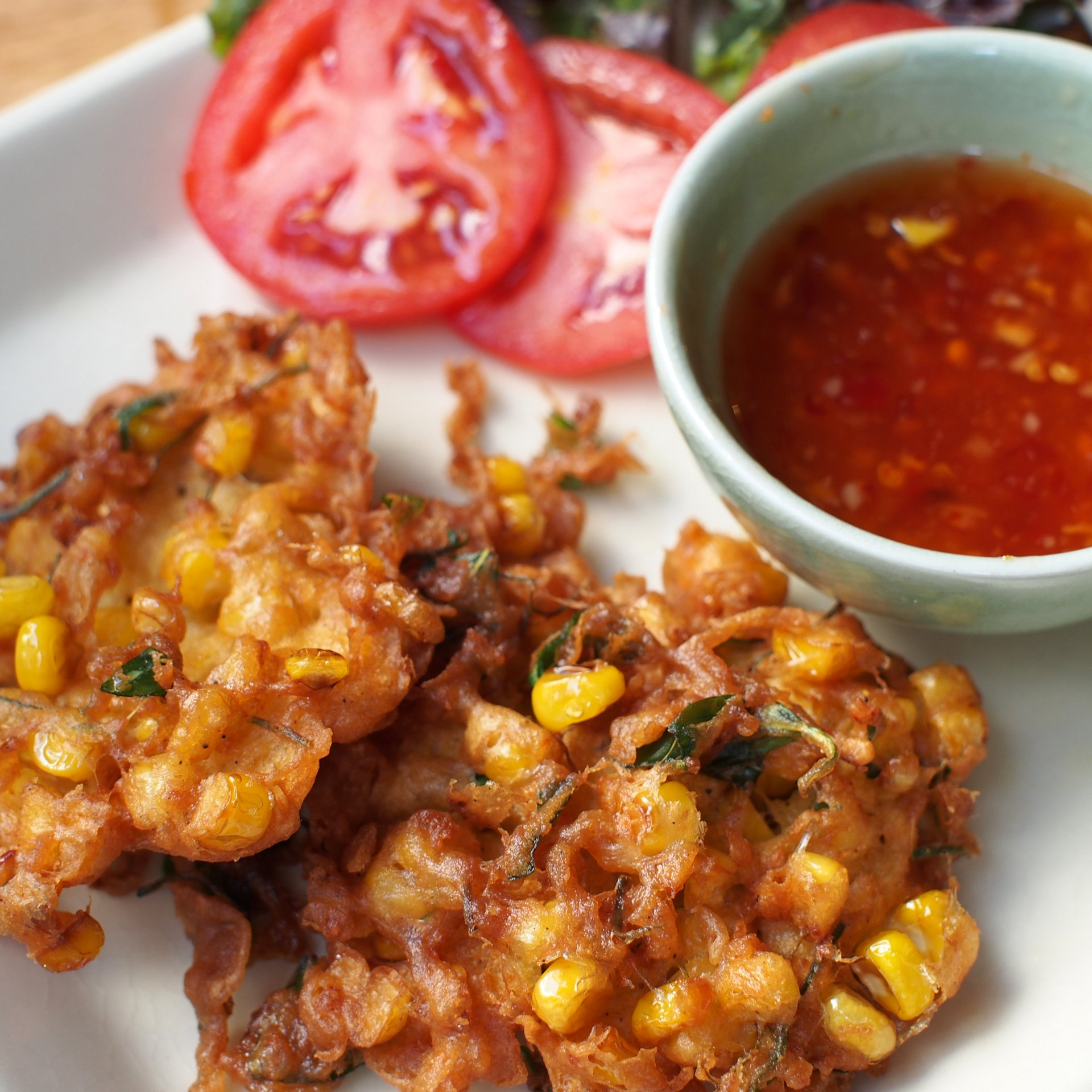
Thot man khaophot deep-fried fritters made with corn and herbs, served with a sweet chilli sauce.

- Yam – general name for many different kinds of sour Thai salads, such as those made with glass noodles (yam wunsen), with seafood (yam thale), or grilled beef (yam nuea). The dressing of a "yam" will normally consist of shallots, fish sauce, tomato, lime juice, sugar, chilies and Thai celery (khuenchai), or coriander.
- Yam pla duk fu – crispy fried catfish with a spicy, sweet-and-sour, green mango salad.

=== Northeastern shared dishes ===
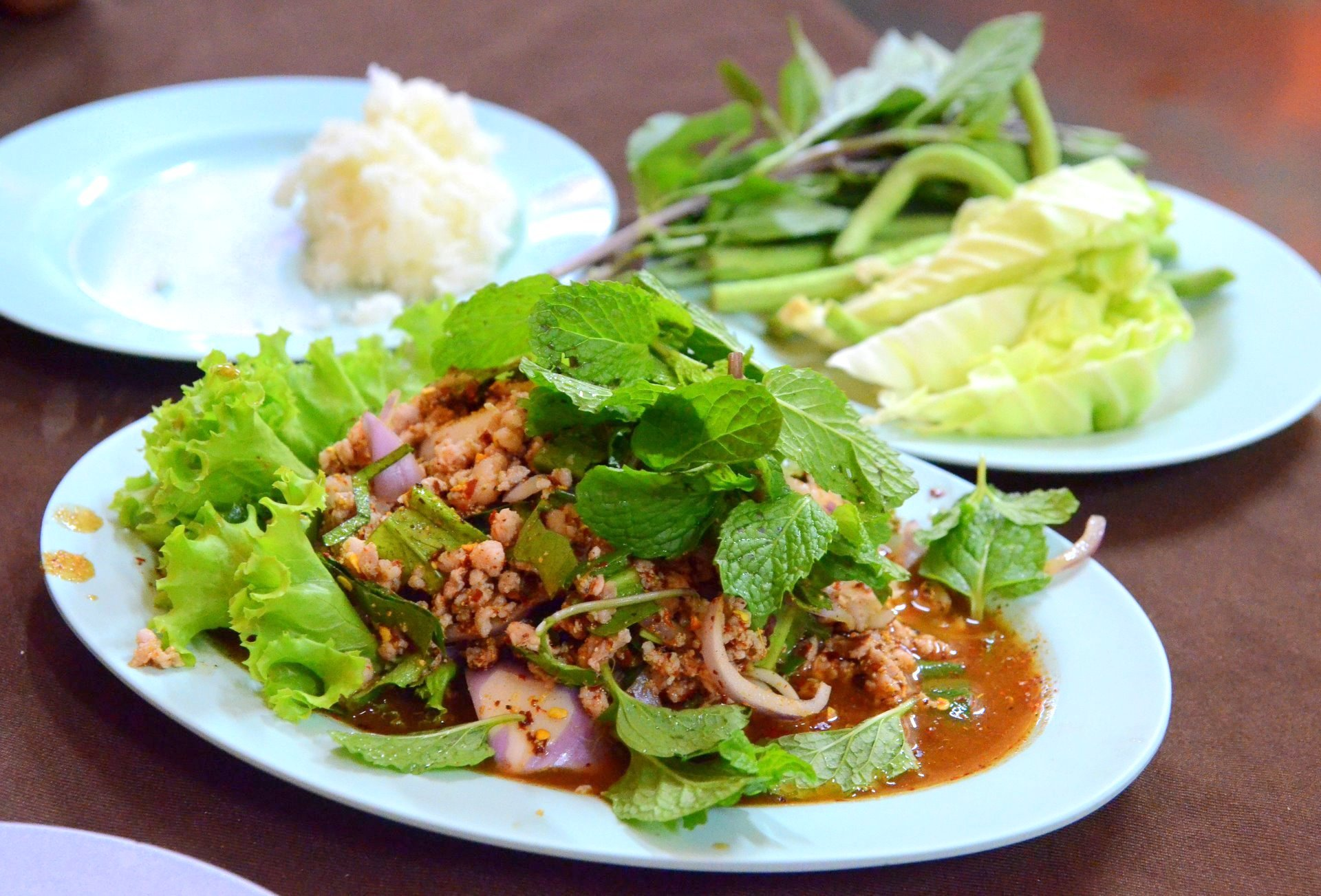
Larb and sticky rice is typical isan dish

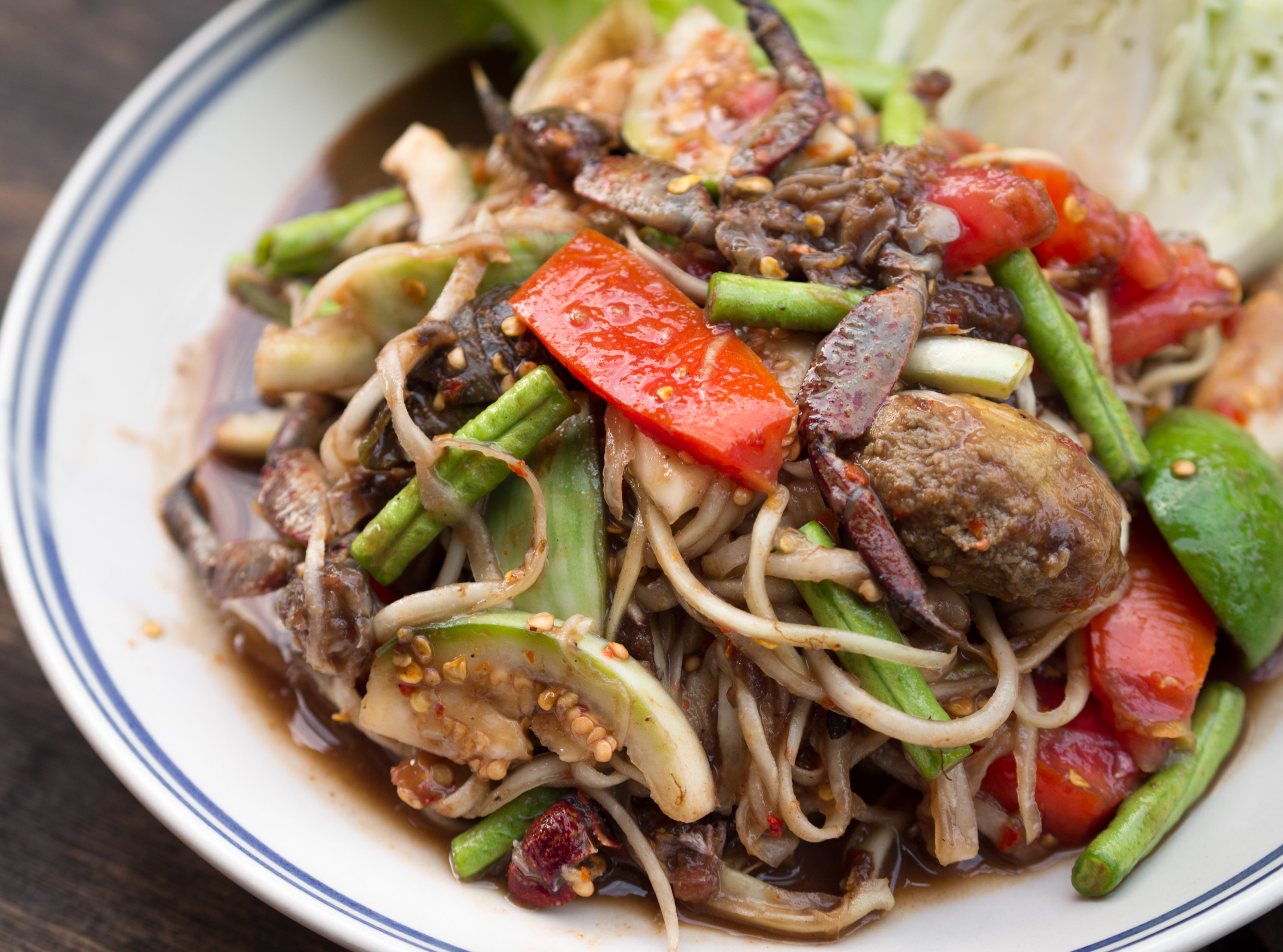
Tam maak hoong, more spicy and salty version of som tam, usually contains pla ra (a sauce of fermented fish).

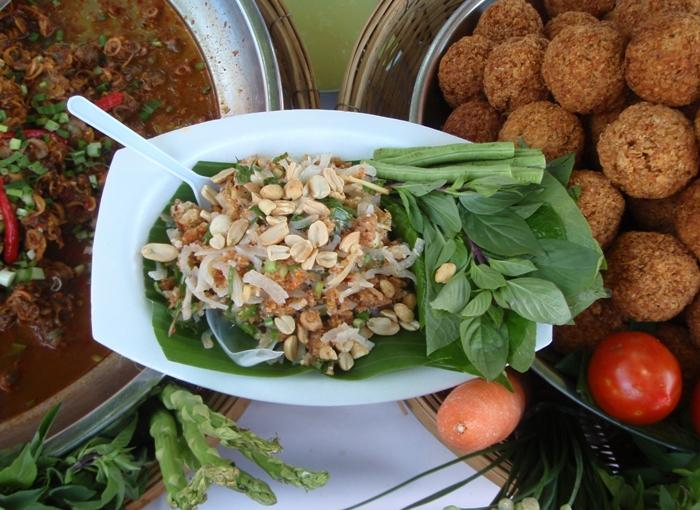
Yam naem khao thot; the crisp rice balls are on the right

Ahan Isan (Thai: อาหารอีสาน; lit. 'Isan food') refers to food from the Northeast region of Thailand. Isan food generally features dishes similar to those found in Laos, as Isan people historically have close ties with Lao culture and speak a language that is generally mutually intelligible with the Lao language. The staple food of Isan is glutinous rice and most of the Isan food is spicy and cooked with local ingredients found on the farms all through northeastern Thailand. Isan people primarily get their income from farming. Rice, sugar cane, pineapple, potato, and rubber are all farmed in this region.

- Isan sausage or sai krok Isan (Thai: ไส้กรอกอีสาน) – fermented pork sausage seasoned with garlic and spices and stuffed with sticky rice and/or glass noodles.
- Kaeng khae hoi (snail curry) – Kaeng khae hoi or kaeng khao khua hoi requires the same ingredients as kaeng khae except for using snails instead of chicken. Roasted ground rice thickens the liquid.
- Lap kai – Lap kai requires minced chicken meat and fresh chicken blood mixed with chili paste for lap made from roasted dried chilies and spices. It is usually eaten with a variety of vegetables and herbs that are pungent known as "phak kap lap". Lap dip refers to the uncooked kind. "Lap suk" is the cooked version which is stir fried with a little oil and water.
- Yam tao (paddy crabs in algae with eggplant) – Yam tao or tam tao is made from fresh water algae grown in paddy fields in Isan and 2–3 kinds of sliced eggplant with boiled crabs and ginger leaves as well as fresh bird chilies.
- Tam khai mot daeng (ant eggs and roasted vegetables) – Tam khai mot daeng is made the same as other kinds of "tam" dishes with roasted long peppers and two kinds of chopped mint to enhance the flavor. Shrimp paste is not used in this recipe.
- Namphrik maeng da (water beetle and chili dip) – This is a rather dry or very thick kind of chili dish. Any kind of chilies (preferably fresh) can be used. Other kinds of edible beetles or wasps or bees can be used instead of the maeng da. Because of the pungent odor of the maeng da, garlic should be left out.
- Yam phak kum dong (pickled phak kum leaf) – The greens of phak kum have to be pickled for at least three days the same way as pickling mustard greens (phak kat). This recipe calls for roasted dried chilies.
- Nam tok mu – made with pork (mu) or beef (nuea) and somewhat identical to Lap, except that the pork or beef is cut into thin strips rather than minced.
- No o (pickled bamboo shoots) – No o refers to bamboo shoots that have a strong smell by the process of quick pickling (2–3 days). Some recipes pickle the shoots with the peels and take off the peel just before boiling. Boiling should be rather long for a good result.
- Namphrik maeng chon (mola crickets and chili dip) – This kind of chili dish is rather dry and very thick. Use fresh chilies of any kind. Other kinds of edible insects or larvae can be used instead of mola crickets which will be called by the name of the insects used as the main ingredients such as wasp, grasshopper, or bee larvae (namphrik to, namphrik taen and namphrik phueng).
- Khai mot daeng – ant eggs – clean and high in protein nutrients. Red ants eat mango leaves so their bodies taste like a squirt of lime, but their fresh eggs are fatty and sweet.
- Kai yang – marinated, grilled chicken.

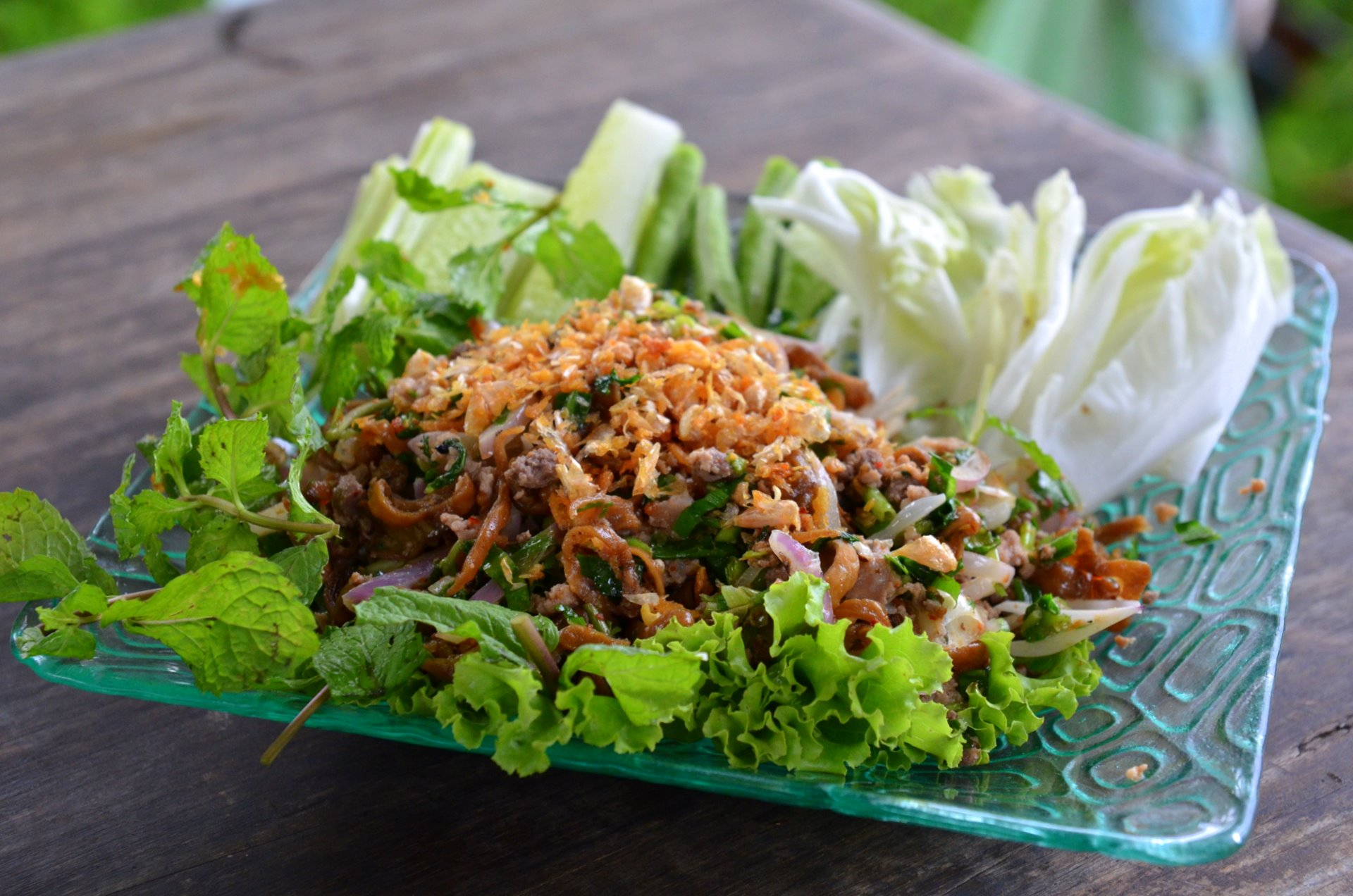
Lap mu krop, is a variation on the standard lap

- Lap – a traditional Lao salad containing meat, onions, chillies, roasted rice powder, and garnished with mint.
- Nam chim chaeo – is a sticky, sweet and spicy dipping sauce made with dried chilies, fish sauce, palm sugar, and black roasted rice flour. It is often served as a dip with mu yang (grilled pork).
- Phat mi Khorat – a stir fried rice noodle dish commonly served with papaya salad in Thailand. Dried rice noodles of many colors are a specific ingredient for this dish.
- Tam maak hoong or Som tam pla ra – spicy papaya salad, similar to central thai som tam, but more spicy and less sweet, and contains pla ra (a sauce of fermented fish).
- Suea rong hai - Grilled beef brisket.
- Tom saep – Northeastern-style hot and sour soup.
- Yam naem khao thot or naem khluk – a salad made of crumbled rice-and-curry croquettes and sour pork sausage.

=== Northern shared dishes ===
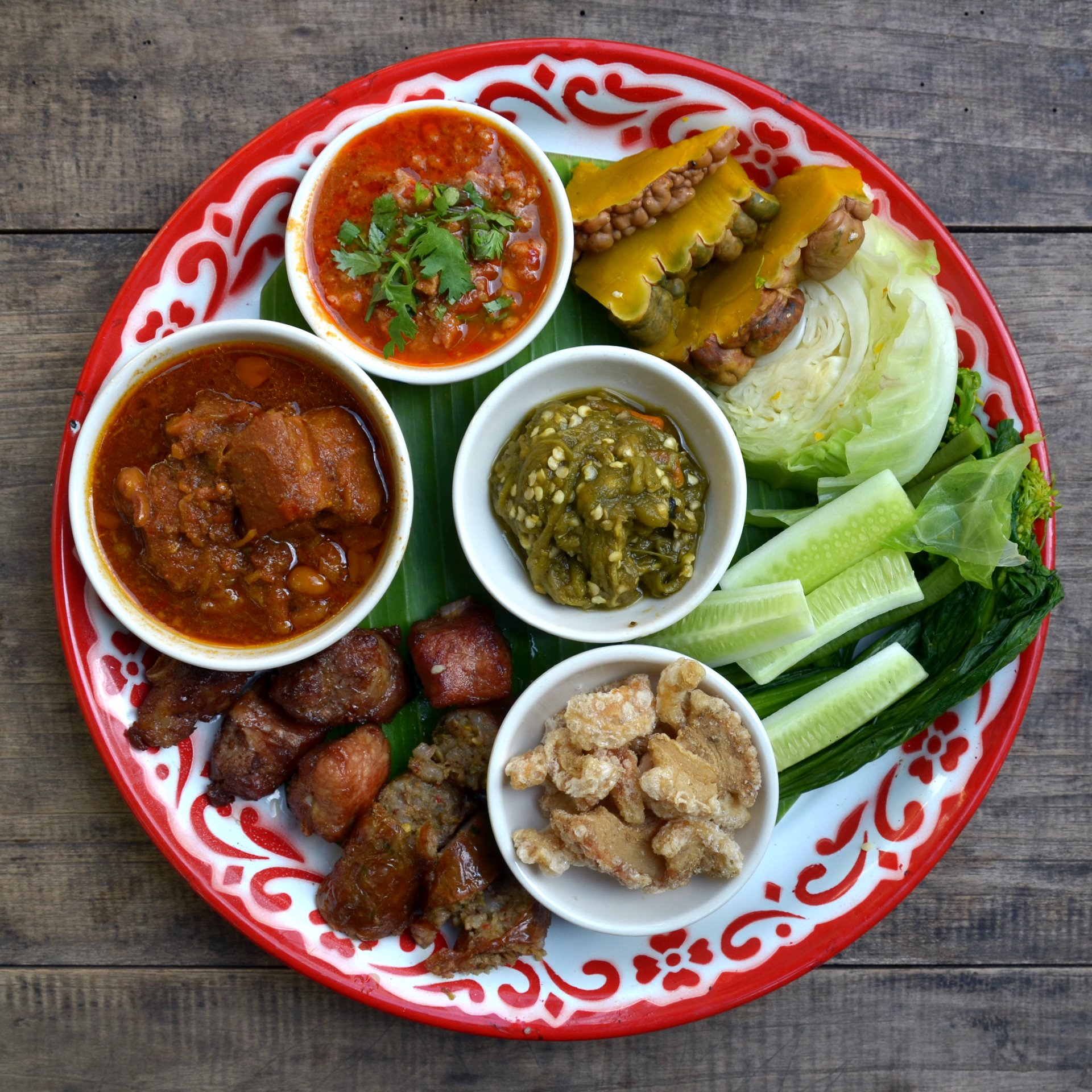
A selection of northern Thai dishes, served as starters

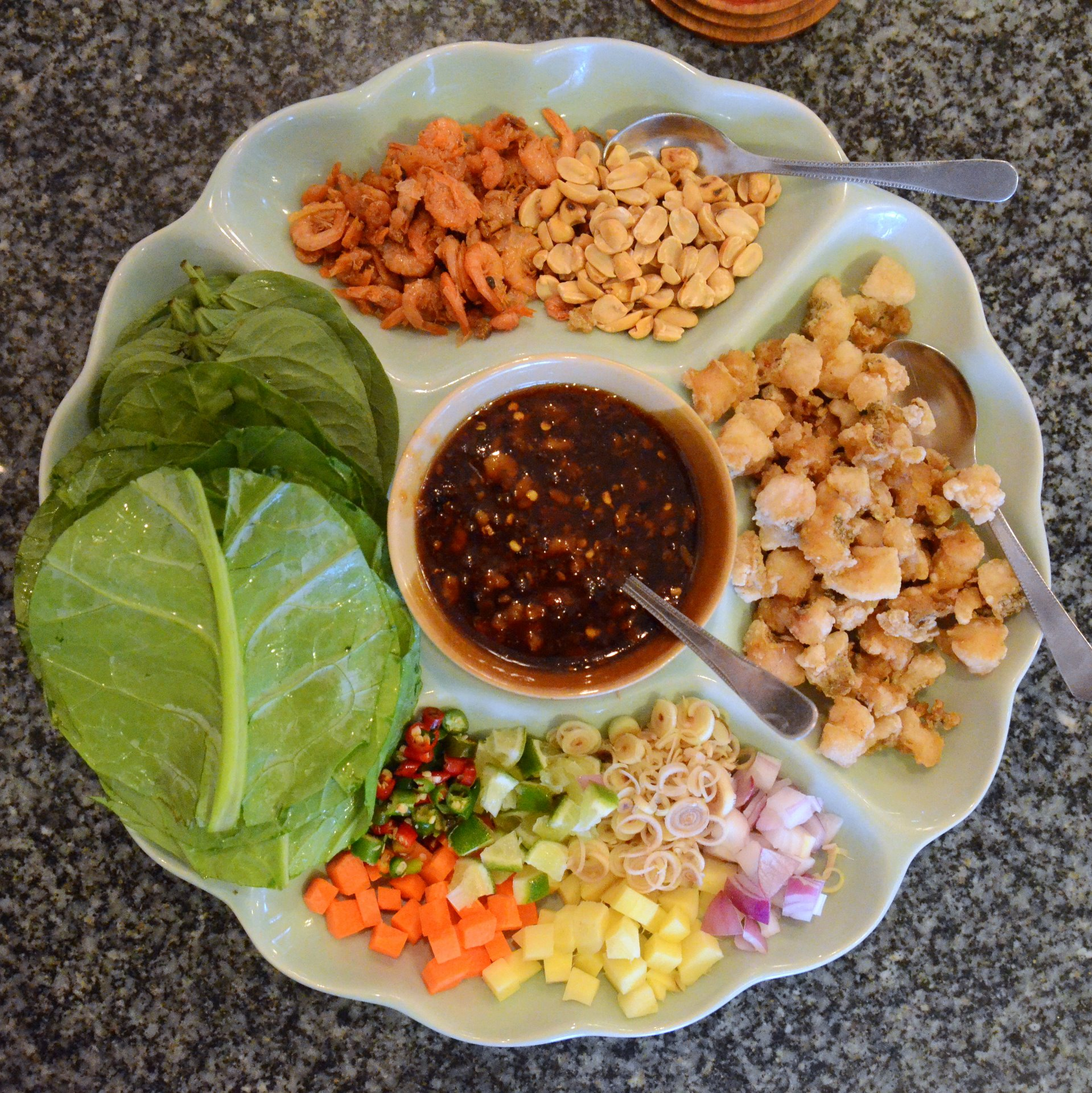
Miang pla literally means "wrapped fish"

Ahan phak nuea (Thai: อาหารภาคเหนือ; lit. 'northern region food') shares certain dishes with neighboring Shan State, in Burma, and with Laos. As in northeastern Thailand, glutinous rice, not jasmine rice, is eaten as the staple food.

- Aep – Slow-grilled wrapped in banana leaves, this dish is most often made with chopped meat, small fish or edible insects, mixed with beaten eggs and spices.
- Kaeng hang le – a Burmese-influenced stewed pork curry which uses peanuts, dried chilies, tamarind juice and curry paste in the recipe, but no coconut milk.
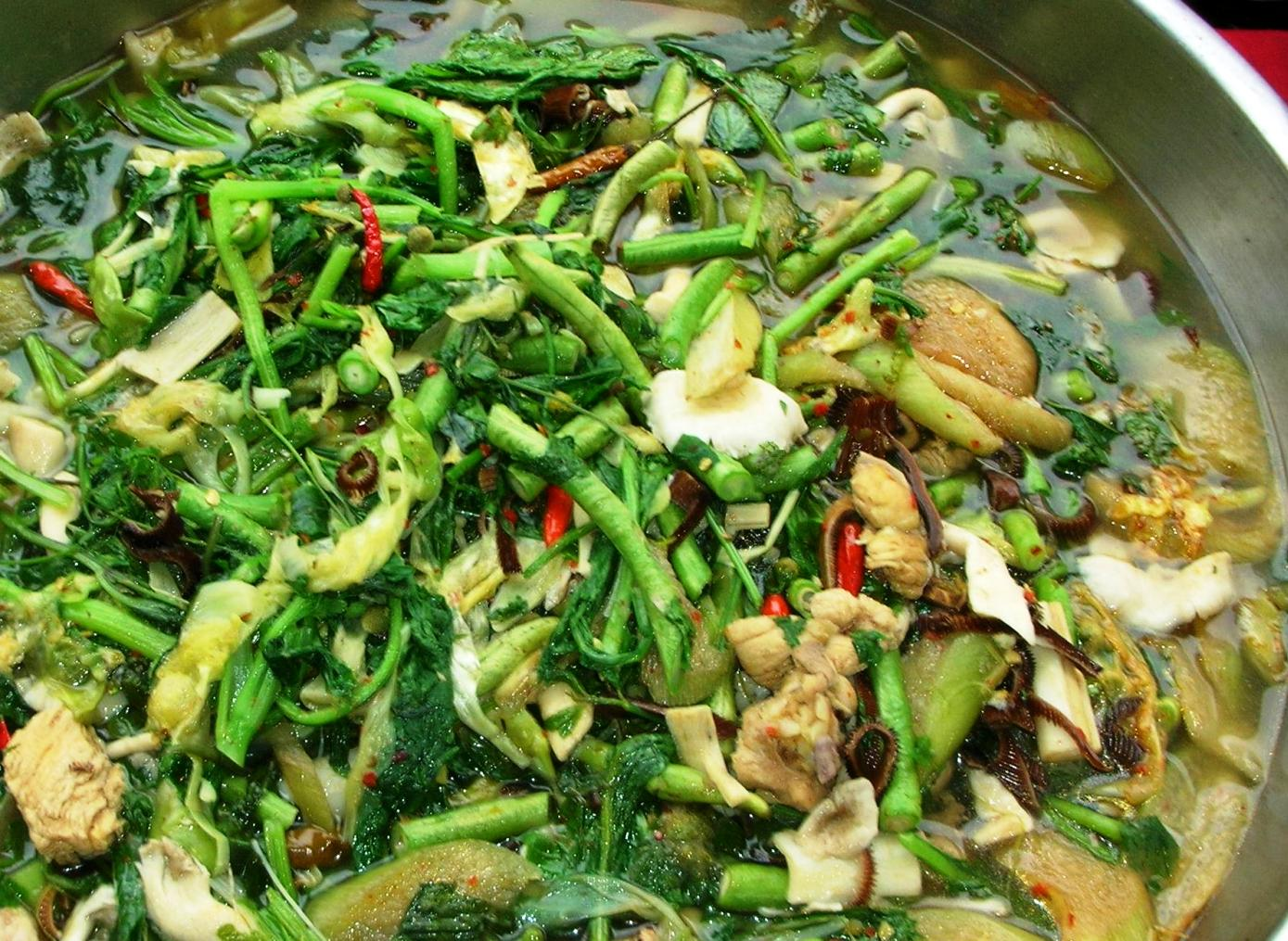
- Kaeng khae
  Kaeng khae – is a spicy curry of herbs, vegetables, the leaves of an acacia tree (cha-om) and meat (chicken, water buffalo, pork or frog). It does not contain coconut milk.
- Kaeng khanun – a curry of pork stewed with green jackfruit. Like all northern Thai curries, it does not contain coconut milk.
- Kaeng pa – Pa in this context has nothing to do with ahan pa ('jungle food'). It does not consist of ingredients found in the forest. It refers to a simple dish with spicy and salty flavours.
- Kaep mu – deep fried crispy pork rinds, often eaten with chili pastes such as nam phrik num.
- Lab nuea – drier and smokier in taste, northern Thai larb does not contain lime or fish sauce. Instead it's flavoured and seasoned with a mix of ground dried chillies, dried spices like cumin, cloves, long pepper, star anise, Sichuan pepper, cinnamon, and occasionally blood of the animal used.
- Nam phrik kha – thick relish made with roasted chilies, garlic, galangal, and salt. This specialty is often served as a dip for steamed mushrooms or steamed sliced beef shank.
- Nam phrik nam oi – brown sugar chili sauce – brown cane sugar sauce is good as a dip for such sour tasting fruit as green mangoes, mango plums, or tamarinds.
- Nam phrik nam pu – crab and chili Sauce – Namphrik nam pu is rather thick to almost dry. Many kinds of fresh chilies can be used also. Including smoked chilies.
- Nam phrik num – a chili paste of pounded large green chilies, shallots, garlic, coriander leaves, lime juice and fish sauce; eaten with steamed and raw vegetables, and sticky rice.
- Nam phrik pla – fish chili sauce – Namphrik pla or fish chili sauce can be a little thick or thin depending on the amount of liquid from the boiling fish one puts in it. Grilled fish can be used instead of boiled fish. Any kinds of fresh chilies can be used from mild to the hottest kinds to suit one's taste. It goes well with water clover, tips of lead tree greens, or crispy eggplant.
- Nam phrik ong – resembling a thick Bolognese sauce, it is made with dried chilies, minced pork, fermented soy beans, and tomato; eaten with steamed and raw vegetables, and sticky rice.
- Sai ua – a grilled sausage of ground pork mixed with spices and herbs; it is often served with chopped fresh ginger and chilies at a meal. It is sold at markets in Chiang Mai as a snack.
- Tam som-o – a salad made from the slightly pounded flesh of a pomelo fruit, which is mixed with garlic, sliced lemongrass, and a thick pungent black paste (nam pu) made from boiling down the juices and meat of rice-paddy crab.

=== Southern shared dishes ===
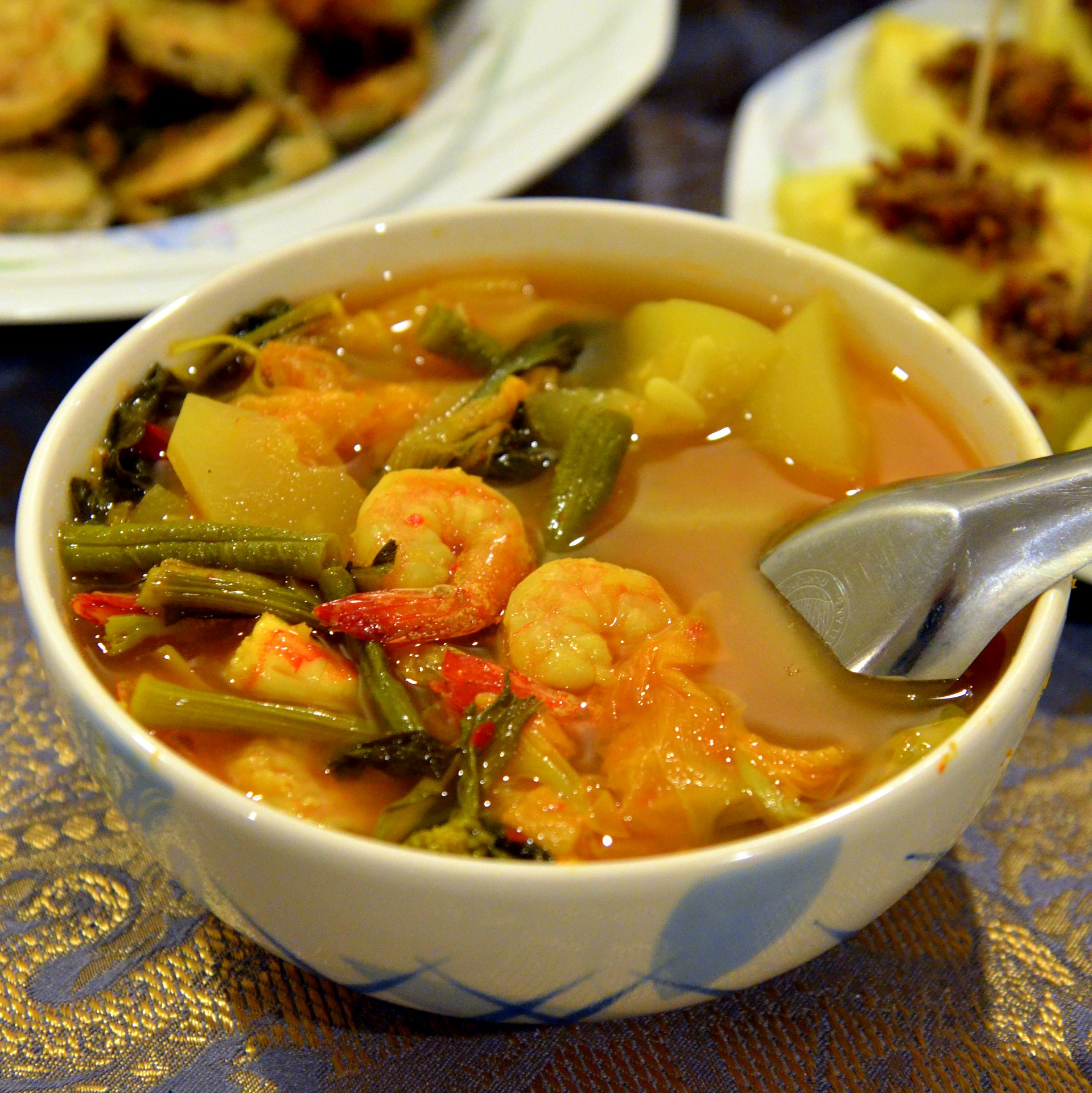
A southern Thai kaeng som, a spicy and sour prawn and vegetable soup/curry.

Ahan Phak Tai (Thai: อาหารภาคใต้; lit. 'southern region food') shares certain dishes with the cuisine of northern Malaysia. Southern Thais, just like the people of central Thailand to the north, and the people of Malaysia to the south, eat non-glutinous rice as their staple food.

- Kaeng matsaman – known in English as Massaman curry, is an Indian-Malay style curry of stewed beef containing roasted dried spices, such as coriander seeds, that are rarely found in other Thai curries. In 2011 CNNGo ranked massaman as number one in an article titled World's 50 most delicious foods.
- Kaeng som (southern Thai name) or kaeng lueang (central Thai name) – a sour curry with fish, vegetables or fruit, deriving its acidity from the use of tamarind juice.
- Kaeng tai pla – a thick sour vegetable curry made with turmeric and shrimp paste, often containing roasted fish or fish innards, bamboo shoots, and eggplant.
- Khao mok – Thai-Malay style biryani, a specialty of southern Thailand's Malay community.
- Khao yam – a rice salad from southern Thailand.
- Khua kling – a dry spicy curry made with minced or diced meat with sometimes yard long beans added to it; often served with fresh green phrik khi nu (Thai chilies) and finely shredded bai makrut (kaffir lime leaves).
- Sate – grilled meat, usually pork or chicken, served with cucumber salad and peanut sauce (of Malaysian-Indonesian origin, but now a popular street food in Thailand).
- Bai liang phat khai – or Gnetum gnemon is native to Southeast Asia. It is widely used in Thai. Bai liang tastes sweet and a bit greasy, not rank and bitter like other species. It is commonly eaten as a vegetable with chili sauce and used to make a variety of dishes such as stir-fry with red curry. A popular dish is stir-fried with eggs called Bai liang phat khai.

== Desserts and sweets ==
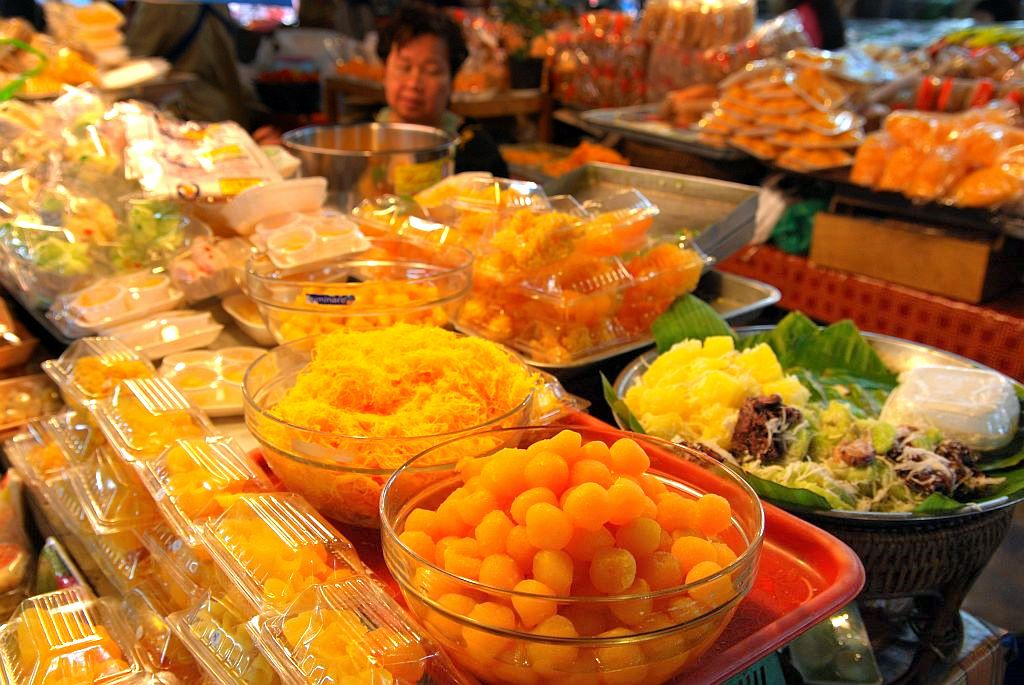
A selection of sweet snacks at a market in Thailand

=== Khong wan ===
(Thai: ของหวาน; RTGS: khong wan) lit. 'sweet things'). Although most Thai meals finish with fresh fruit, sometimes sweet snacks, often eaten between meals, will also be served as a dessert.

- Bua loi – mashed taro root and pumpkin mixed with rice flour into small balls, boiled, then served in coconut milk.
- Chaokuai – grass jelly is often served with only shaved ice and brown sugar.
- Chor muang
- Khanom krok – coconut-rice pancakes, one of the ancient Thai desserts.
- Khanom krok bai toei – ancient Thai dessert, shaped to look like flowers.
- Khao tom mat – a traditional Thai dessert prepared from sticky rice, coconut milk, and banana.
- Khanom chan – multi-layers of pandanus-flavoured sticky rice flour mixed with coconut milk. It is one of the nine auspicious Thai desserts.
- Khanom dok chok – crispy lotus blossom cookie made from starch, eggs, and coconut milk.
- Khanom farang kudi chin – a sponge cake of Portuguese origin made in the Kudi Chin community in Bangkok's Thon Buri District. The cake was baked Portuguese-style in a wood-fired oven, but the pumpkin topping came from local Chinese who considered the fruit auspicious. It uses only three ingredients: flour, duck eggs, and sugar. The cake has been named by Bangkok City Hall as one of the six "local wisdoms" of Bangkok considered worthy of preservation.
- Khanom chak – sticky rice flour mixed with shredded coconut, covered with nipa palm leaves.
- Khanom ja mongkut – One of nine auspicious Thai sweets made of egg yolks, coconut milk, sugar, and flour which is slow cooked until it becomes a paste, which is then carved into crown shapes.
- Khanom kai hong – Sphere candy has mincemeat eaten only palace people in reign of King Rama I.
- Khanom kho
- Khanom la
- Khanom mo kaeng – a sweet baked pudding containing coconut milk, eggs, palm sugar, and flour, sprinkled with sweet fried onions.
- Khanom piakpun – square shaped, made from coconut milk and pandan juice, cut into pieces and served.
- Khanom tan – palm–flavoured mini cake topped with shredded coconut.
- Khanom tom – a rice flour dumpling filled with palm sugar and shredded coconut and topped with shredded coconut.
- Khanom thuai talai – steamed sweet coconut jelly and cream.
- Khanom wong
- Khao lam – cake made from steamed rice mixed with beans or peas, grated coconut, and coconut milk.
- Khao niao mamuang – sticky rice cooked in sweetened thick coconut milk, served with slices of ripe mango.
- Khao niew tua dum –sticky rice cooked in sweetened thick coconut milk with black turtle beans.
- Kluai buat chi – bananas in coconut milk.
- Lot chong nam kathi – pandan flavoured rice flour noodles in coconut milk, similar to the Indonesian cendol.
- Mamuang kuan – sweets made from preserved mango, often sold as flat wafers, or as a roll.
- Roti saimai – Thai-style cotton candy wrapped in roti.
- Ruam mit – mixed ingredients, such as chestnuts covered in flour, jackfruit, lotus root, tapioca, and lot chong, in coconut milk.
- Sangkhaya – coconut custard variant.
- Sangkhaya fak thong – egg and coconut custard served with pumpkin, similar to the coconut jam of Malaysia, Indonesia, and the Philippines.
- Sarim – multi-colored mung bean flour noodles in sweetened coconut milk served with crushed ice.
- Tako – jasmine scented coconut pudding set in cups of pandanus leaf.
- Thong yip- "pinched gold egg yolks". One of the nine auspicious Thai desserts.
- Thong yot – sweet round egg ball. One of the nine auspicious Thai desserts.
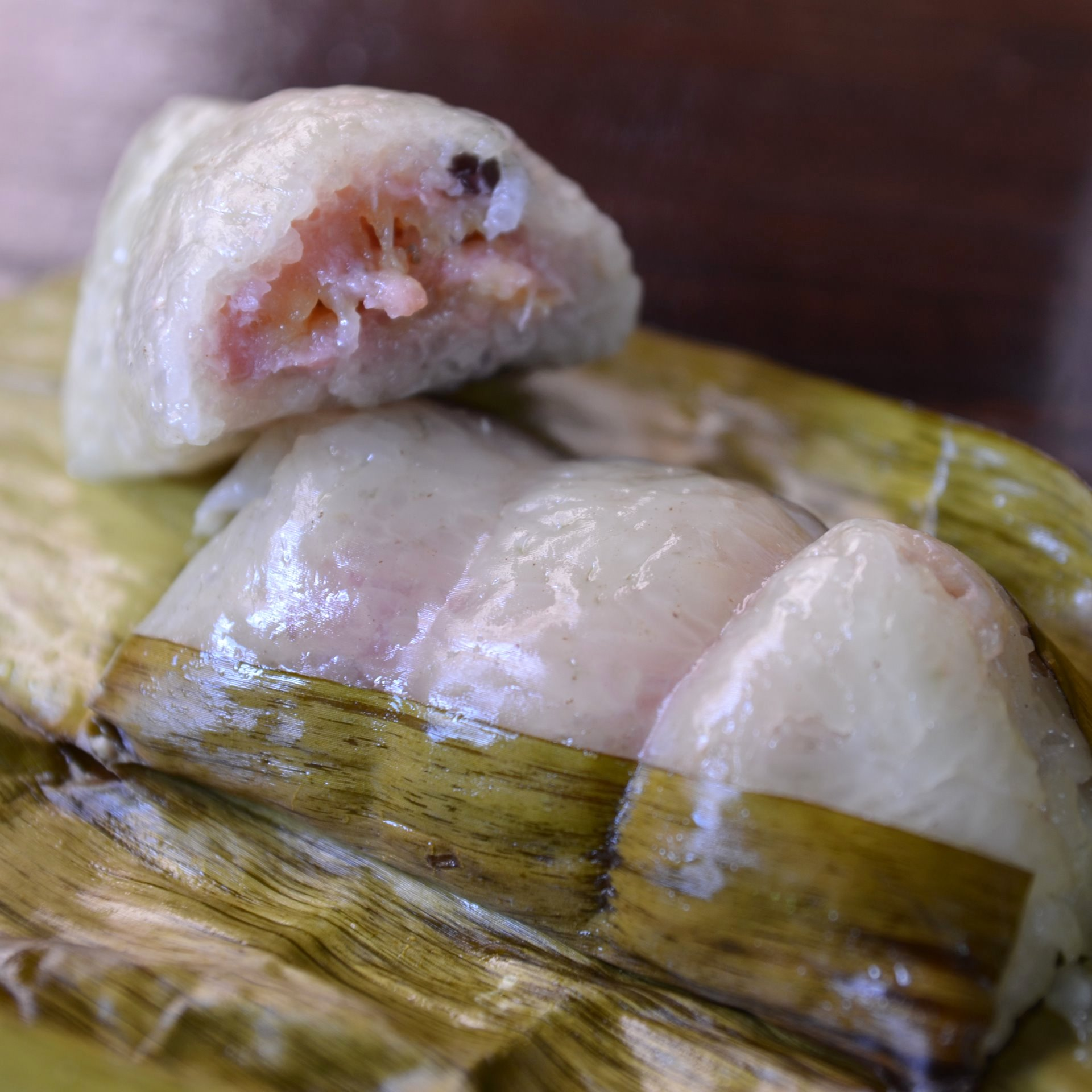
Khao tom mat, sticky rice and banana

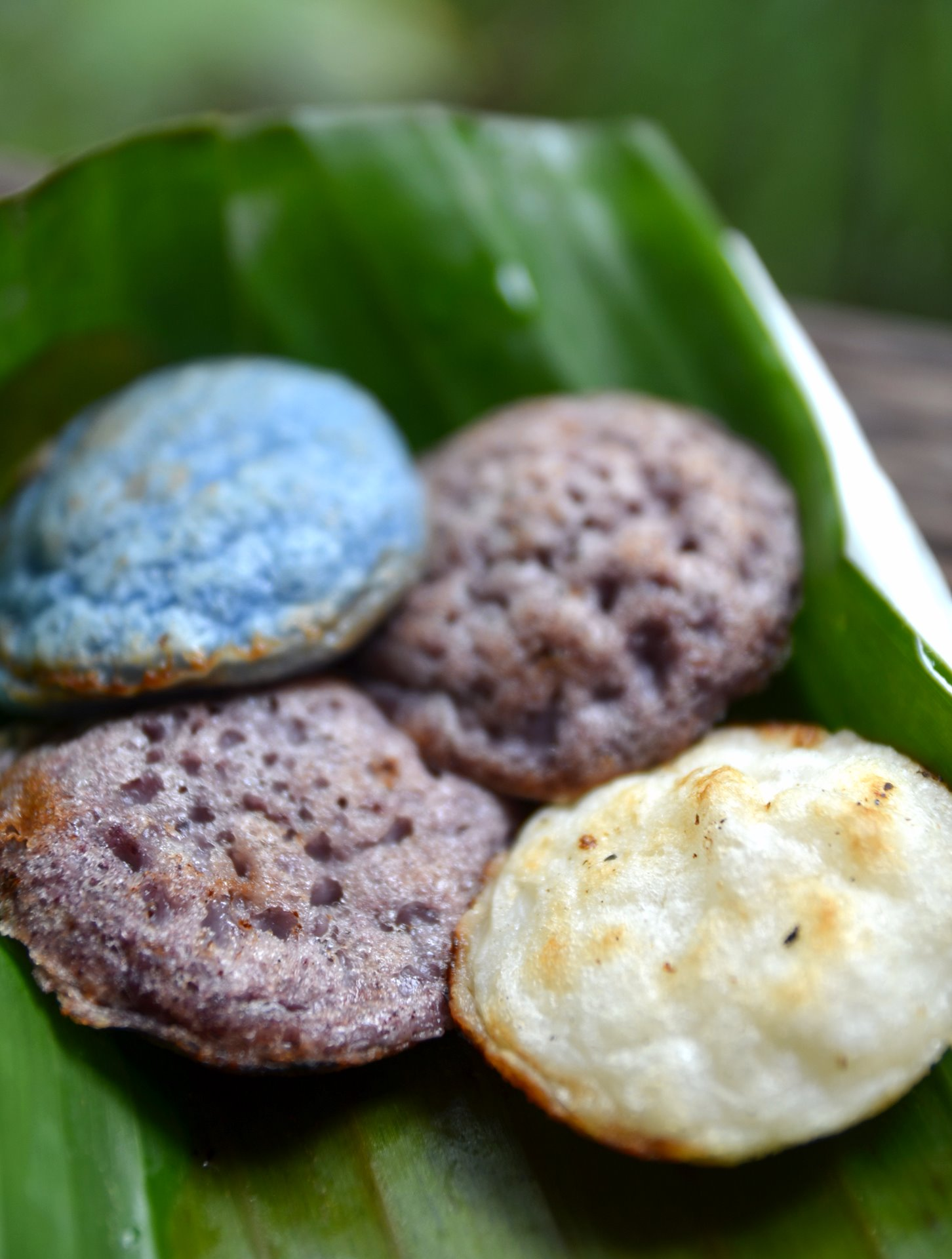
Khanom krok, coconut milk

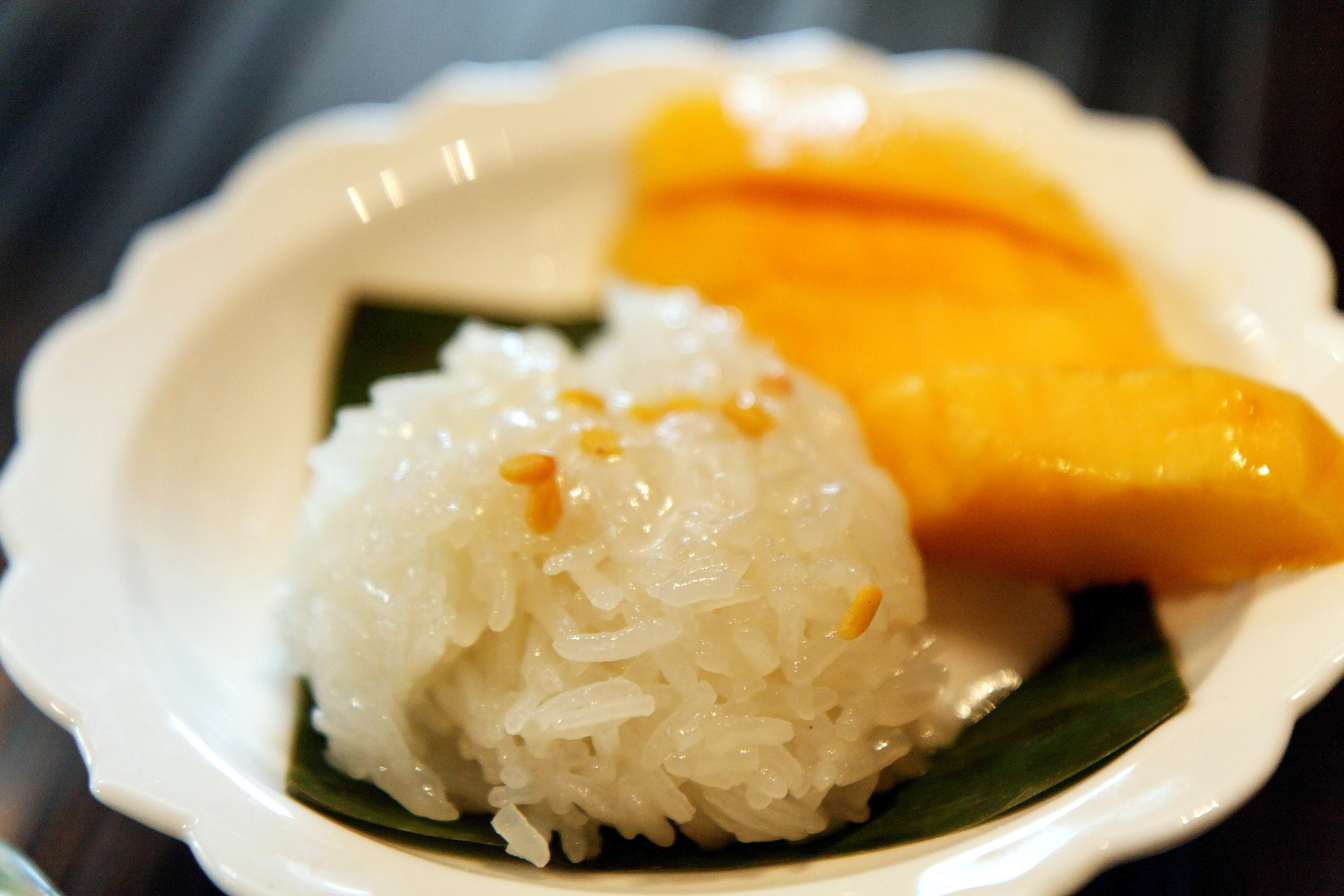
Khao niao mamuang, glutinous rice, fresh mango and coconut milk

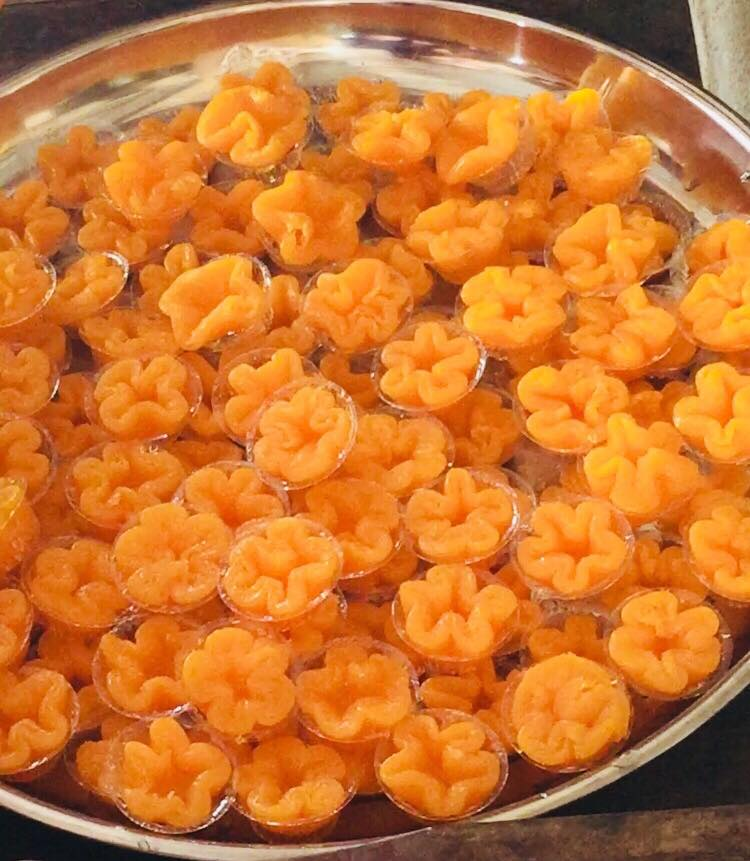
Thong yip

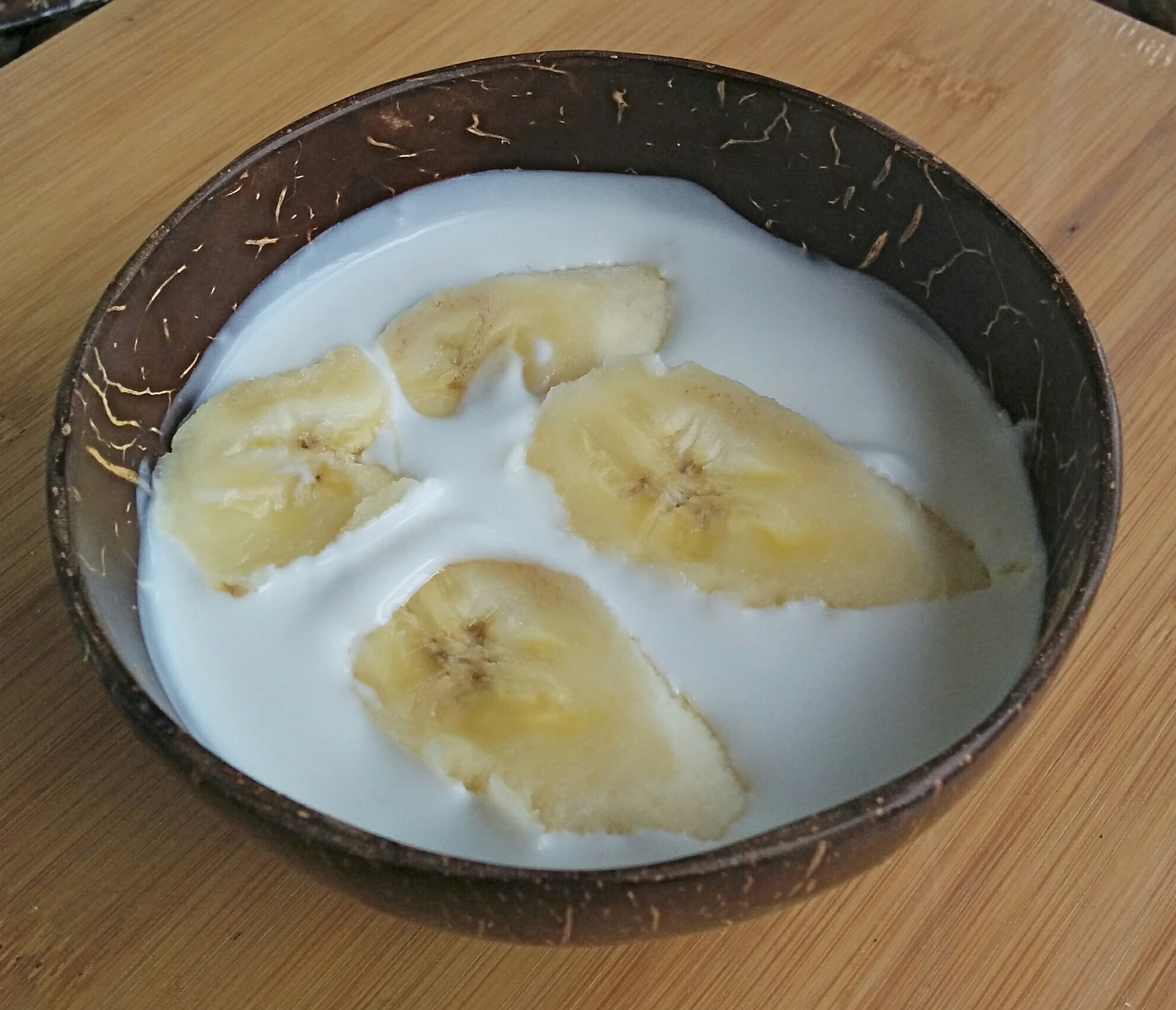
Kluai buat chi banana, coconut milk and coconut cream

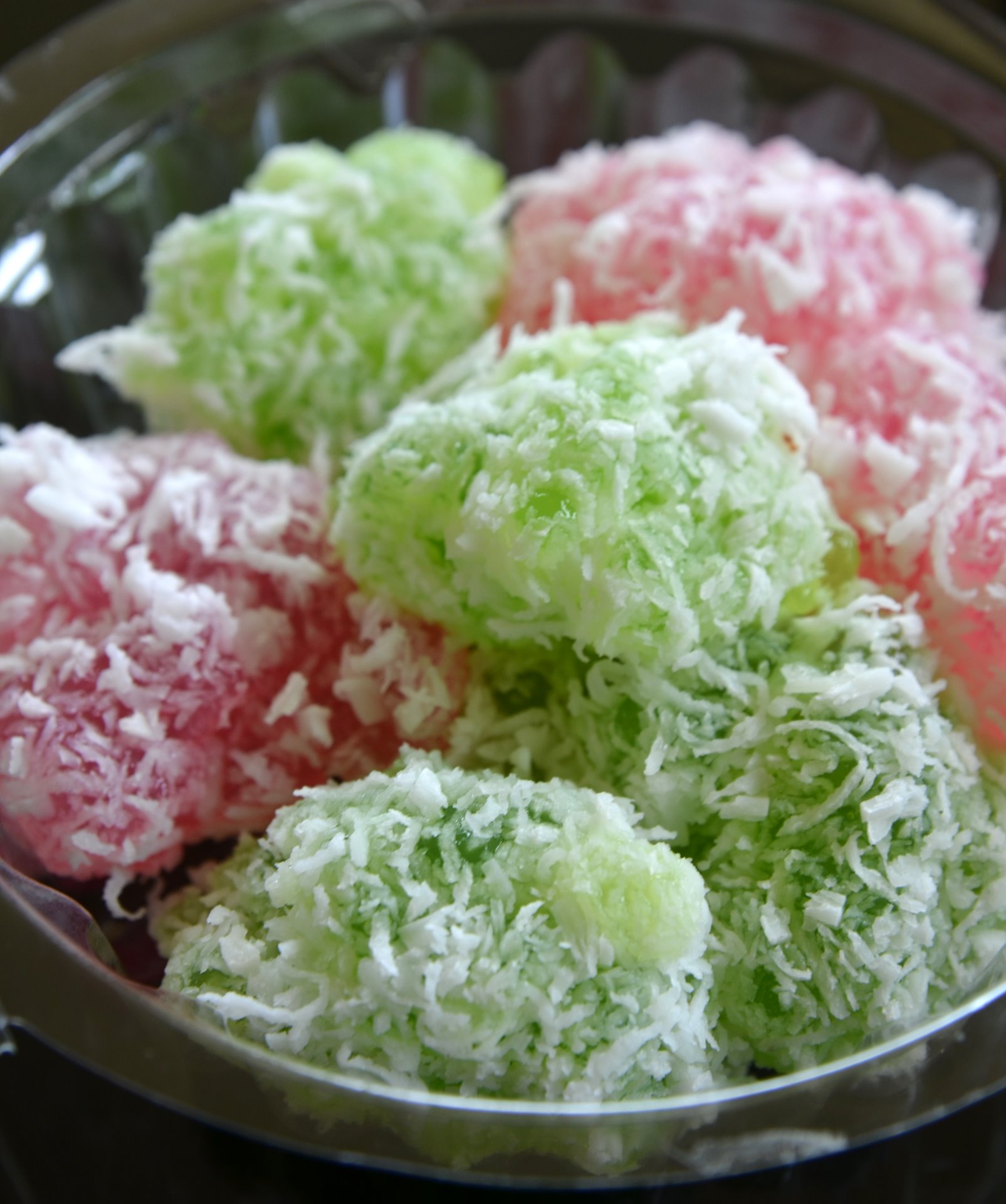
Khanom tom, glutinous rice powder, coconut cream, grated coconut, sugar and flavourings

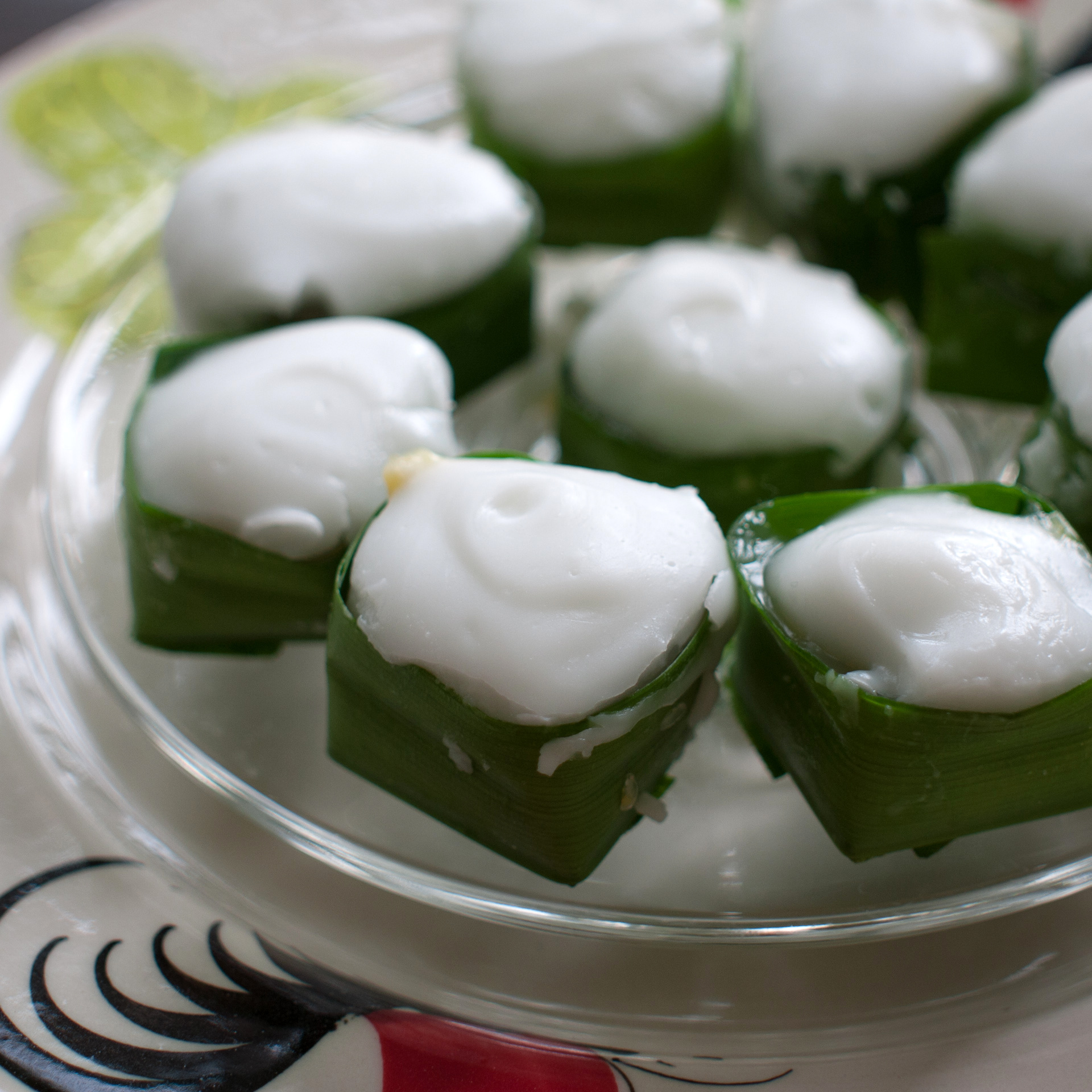
Khanom tako

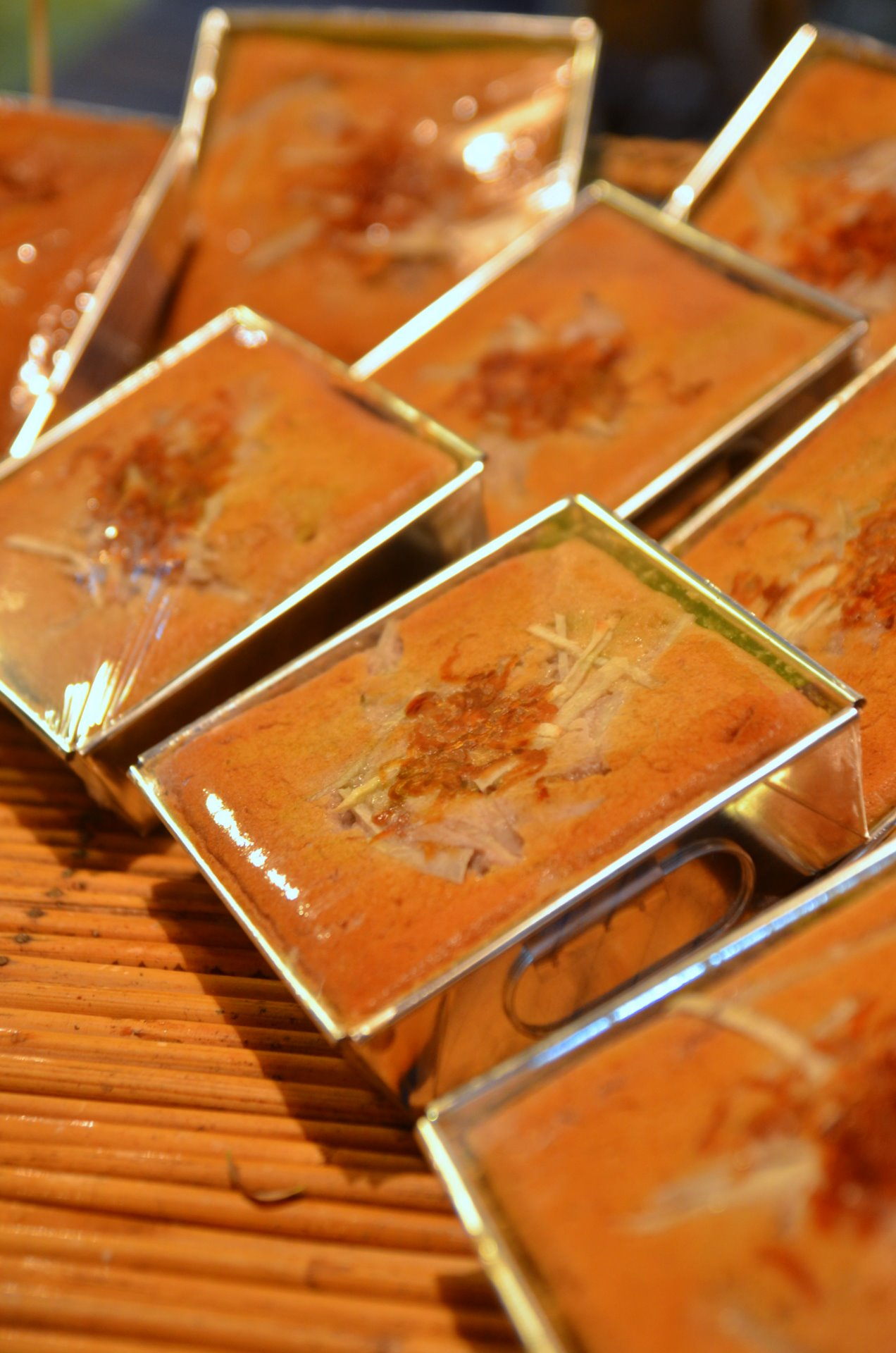
Khanom mo kaeng

=== Ice cream ===
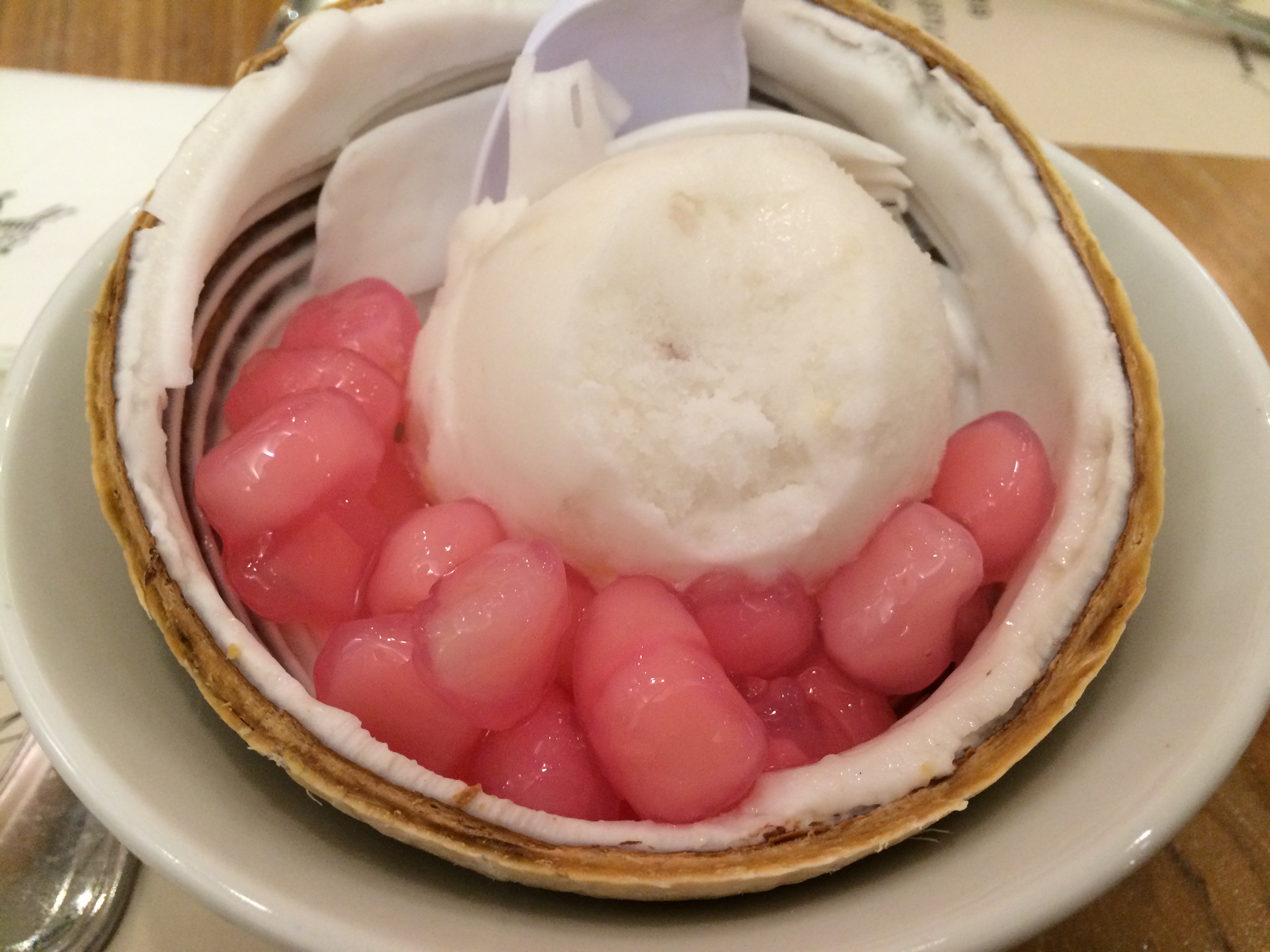
Ice cream with thapthim krop, Bangkok

Ice cream was introduced to Thailand during the reign of King Rama V when the first ice cream machine was imported to Thailand. Ice cream in the second half of the 19th century was made of coconut water blended with ice. At first, ice could not be produced in Thailand. That led to importing ice from Singapore. Ice cream was then an upper-class treat, but over time ice cream became more widely available and the product was improved by replacing coconut water with coconut milk.

There were two types of ice cream in Thailand. First, ice cream in the palace was made of coconut juice with roasted tamarind on top. Second, ice cream for the public was coconut ice cream with the scent of the Nommaeo flower with a slight sweet taste. The ice cream "tube" was born during the reign of Rama VII. Its ingredients were contained inside a zinc tube which was shaken until it solidified, then skewered stick to serve as a handle. It was sold by mobile vendors using dry ice and salt to keep the ice cream cold. Eventually, ice cream was manufactured and sold in small cups.

According to the Bangkok Post, aitim tat (Thai: ไอติมตัด; "cut ice cream"), was very popular 30 years ago (1986). It came in rectangular bars of various flavors, sliced into pieces by the vendor, who then inserted two wooden sticks into the pieces to use as holders. Aitim tat was made from milk, coconut milk, flour, sugar, and artificial flavour. The price was one or two baht, depending on the size.

The Pop Company in the 1970s set up the first ice-cream manufacturing plant in Thailand. The company used a duck logo, resulting it the nickname aitim tra pet (Thai: ไอติมตราเป็ด; "duck brand ice cream"). It was sold in front of Chaloemchai Theater. Its most popular offering was called "banana split", with three flavors of ice cream, chocolate, vanilla, and strawberry.

== Beverages ==
Khrueang duem (Thai: เครื่องดื่ม; lit. 'beverages')

- Cha yen – Thai iced tea.
- Krating Daeng – an energy drink and the origin of Red Bull.
- Nam maphrao – the juice of a young coconut, often served inside the coconut.
- Nam matum – a refreshing and healthy drink made from the fruit of the Bael tree.
- Nom yen – a drink made from sala syrup and hot milk.
- Oliang – a sweet Thai black iced coffee.
- Lao Khao – a traditional distilled spirits, since Ayutthaya period, which perhaps give origin to Okinawa liquor called Awamori.
- Satho – a traditional rice wine from the Isan region.
- Nam bai bua bok – A refreshing and healthy drink is made from the green leaf of the Centella asiatica.

Other alcoholic beverages from Thailand include Hong Thong, Phraya, Regency, Mekhong and Sang Som. Several brands of beer are brewed in Thailand; the two most prominent brands are Singha and Chang.

== Insects ==
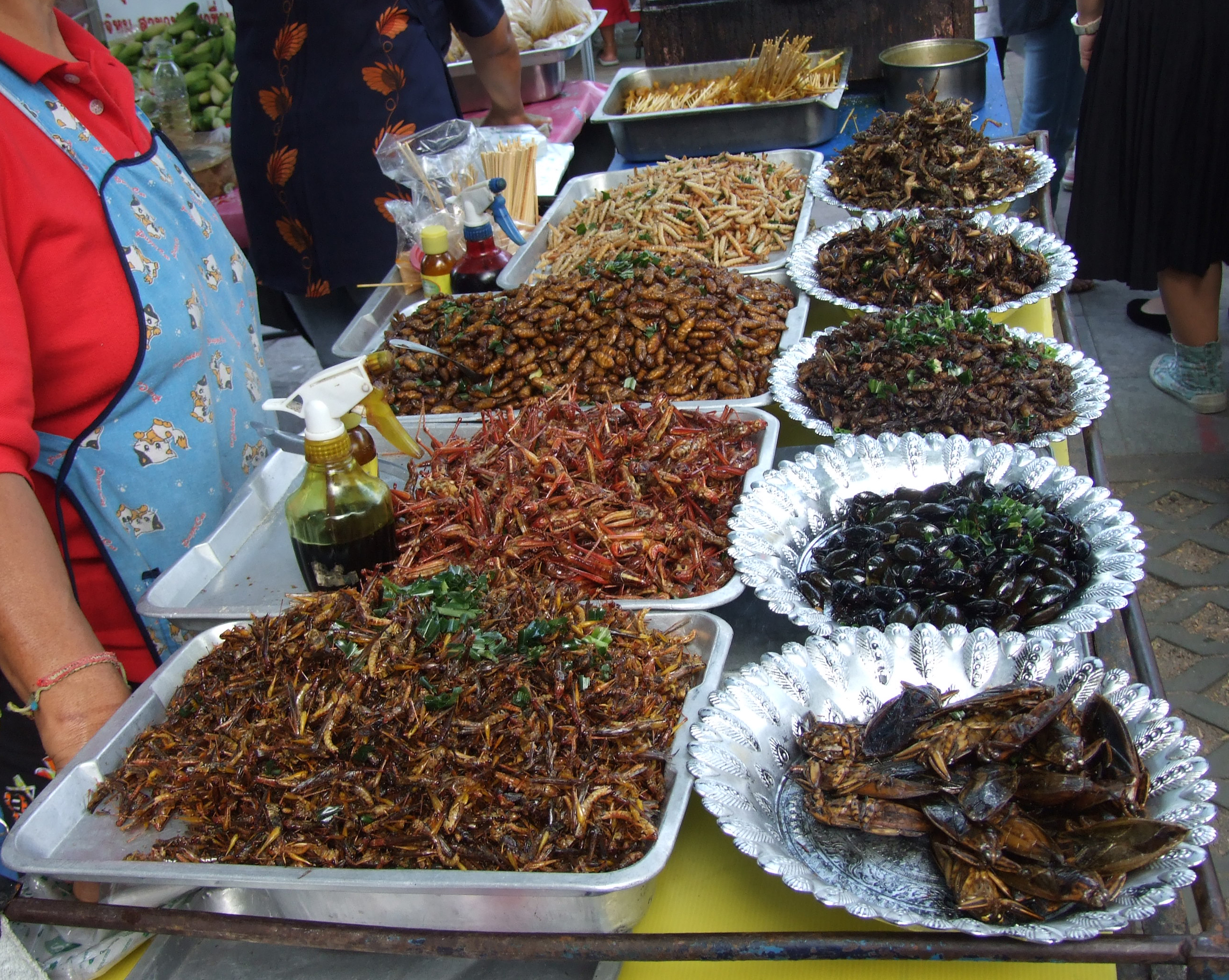
A street stall selling fried insects

Edible insects, whole or in chili paste and as ingredients in fortified products, are common in Thailand. Some claim that Thailand is the world leader in edible insects. The UN Food and Agriculture Organization (FAO) estimates that there are about 20,000 cricket farms alone in 53 of Thailand's 76 provinces.

A wide range of insects are eaten in Thailand, especially in Isan and in the north. Many markets in Thailand sell deep-fried grasshoppers, crickets (ching-rit), bee larvae, silkworm (non mai), ant eggs (khai mot) and termites.

Most insects reportedly taste fairly bland when deep-fried. In contrast to the bland taste of most of these insects, the maeng da or maelong da na (Lethocerus indicus) has been described as having a very penetrating taste, similar to that of a very ripe gorgonzola cheese. This giant water bug is famously used in a chili dip called nam phrik maeng da. Ant eggs and silkworms are eaten boiled in a soup in Isan, or used in egg dishes in northern Thailand.

== Street food, food courts, and market food ==
The street food culture of much of Southeast Asia was introduced by Chinese immigrants during the late 19th century. As a result, many Thai street foods are derived from or heavily influenced by Chinese cuisine. Street food was commonly sold by the ethnic Chinese population of Thailand and did not become popular among native Thai people until the early 1960s, when the rapid urban population growth stimulated the street food culture, and by the 1970s, it had "displaced home-cooking."

The quality and choice of street food in Thailand is world-renowned. Bangkok is often mentioned as one of the best street food cities in the world, and even called the street food capital of the world. The website VirtualTourist says: "Few places in the world, if any, are as synonymous with street food as Thailand. For the variety of locations and abundance of options, we selected Bangkok, Thailand, as our number one spot for street food. Bangkok is notable for both its variety of offerings and the city's abundance of street hawkers."

There is scarcely a Thai dish that is not sold by a street vendor or at a market somewhere in Thailand. Some specialize in only one or two dishes; others offer a complete menu that rival that of restaurants. Some sell only pre-cooked foods, while others make food to order. Foods that are made to order tend to be dishes that can be quickly prepared: quick stir fries with rice, such as phat kaphrao (spicy basil-fried minced pork, chicken, or seafood) or phat khana (stir fried gailan) and quick curries such as pladuk phat phet (catfish fried with red curry paste).

Noodles are a popular street food item as they are mainly eaten as a single dish. Chinese-style noodle soups, fried noodles, and fermented Thai rice noodles (khanom chin), served with a choice of different Thai curries, are popular. Nearly everywhere in Thailand, you will see som tam (green papaya salad) and sticky rice sold at stalls and roadside shops. This is popularly eaten together with grilled chicken, but if the shop does not sell any themselves, someone else nearby will. In most cities and towns there will be stalls selling sweet roti, a thin, flat fried dough envelope, with fillings such as banana, egg, and chocolate. The roti is similar to the Malay roti canai and Singaporean roti prata, and the stalls are often operated by Thai Muslims. Sweets snacks, collectively called khanom, such as tako (coconut cream jelly), khanom man (coconut cassava cake), and khanom wun (flavored jellies), can be seen displayed on large trays in glass covered push-carts. Other sweets, such as khanom bueang and khanom krok (somewhat similar to Dutch poffertjes), are made to order.

In the evenings, mobile street stalls, often only a scooter with a side car, drive by and temporarily set up shop outside bars in Thailand, selling kap klaem ("drinking food"). Popular kap klaem dishes sold by mobile vendors are grilled items such as sun-dried squid, meats on skewers, or grilled sour sausages, and deep-fried snacks such as fried insects or fried sausages. Peeled and sliced fruits are also sold from street carts, laid out on a bed of crushed ice to preserve their freshness. Salapao, steamed buns filled with meat or sweet beans and the Thai version of the Chinese steamed baozi, are also commonly sold by mobile vendors.

Food markets in Thailand, large open air halls with permanent stalls, tend to operate as a collection of street stalls, each vendor with their own set of tables and providing (limited) service, although some resemble the regular food courts at shopping malls and large supermarkets, with service counters and the communal use of tables. Food courts and food markets offer many of the same foods as street stalls, both pre-cooked as well as made to order. Night food markets, in the form of a collection of street stalls and mobile vendors, spring up in parking lots, along busy streets, and at temple fairs and local festivals in the evenings, when the temperatures are more agreeable and people have finished work.

The dishes sold at wet markets in Thailand tend to be offered pre-cooked. Many people go there, and also to street vendors, to buy food for at work, or to take back home. It is a common sight to see Thais carrying whole communal meals consisting of several dishes, cooked rice, sweets, and fruit, all neatly packaged in plastic bags and foam food containers, to be shared with colleagues at work or at home with friends and family. Due to the fact that many dishes are similar to those that people would cook at home, it is a good place to find regional, and seasonal, foods.

== Vegetarianism in Thailand ==
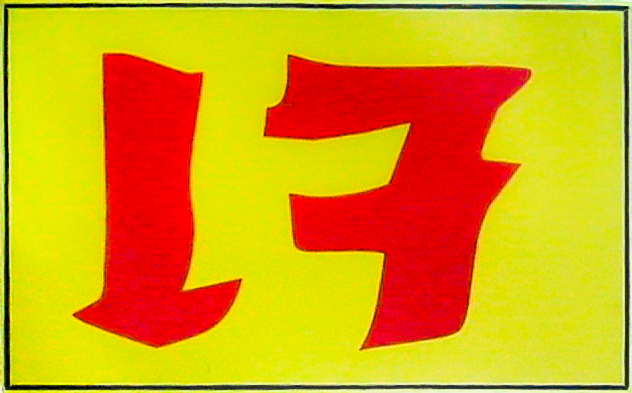
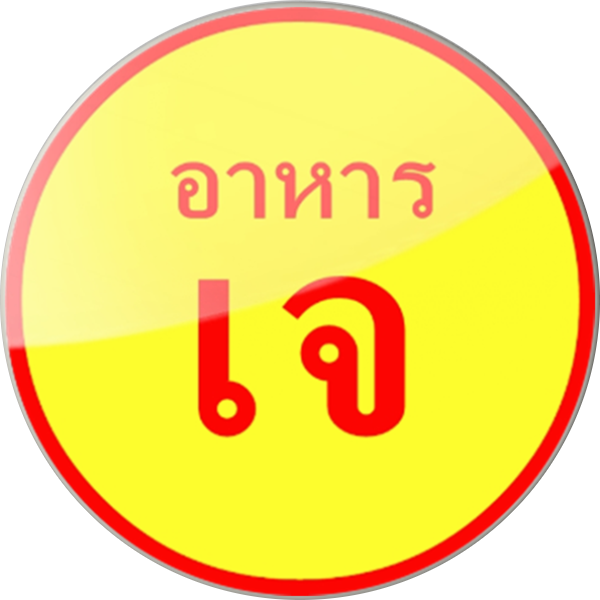
Traditional Thai vegetarian restaurants will carry yellow signs with che (Thai: เจ) (left) or ahan che (Thai: อาหารเจ) (right) written in red in Thai script.

Although the Vegetarian Festival is celebrated each year by a portion of Thailand's population, and many restaurants in Thailand will offer vegetarian food during this festival period, pure vegetarian food is usually difficult to find in normal restaurants and eateries in Thailand. All traditionally made Thai curries, for instance, contain shrimp paste, and fish sauce is used as salt in many Thai dishes. At shops and restaurants that specifically cater to vegetarians, substitutes for these ingredients are used. Meat dishes are also commonly part of the alms offered to Buddhist monks in Thailand, as vegetarianism is not considered obligatory in Theravada Buddhism, but having an animal killed specifically to feed Buddhist monks is prohibited.

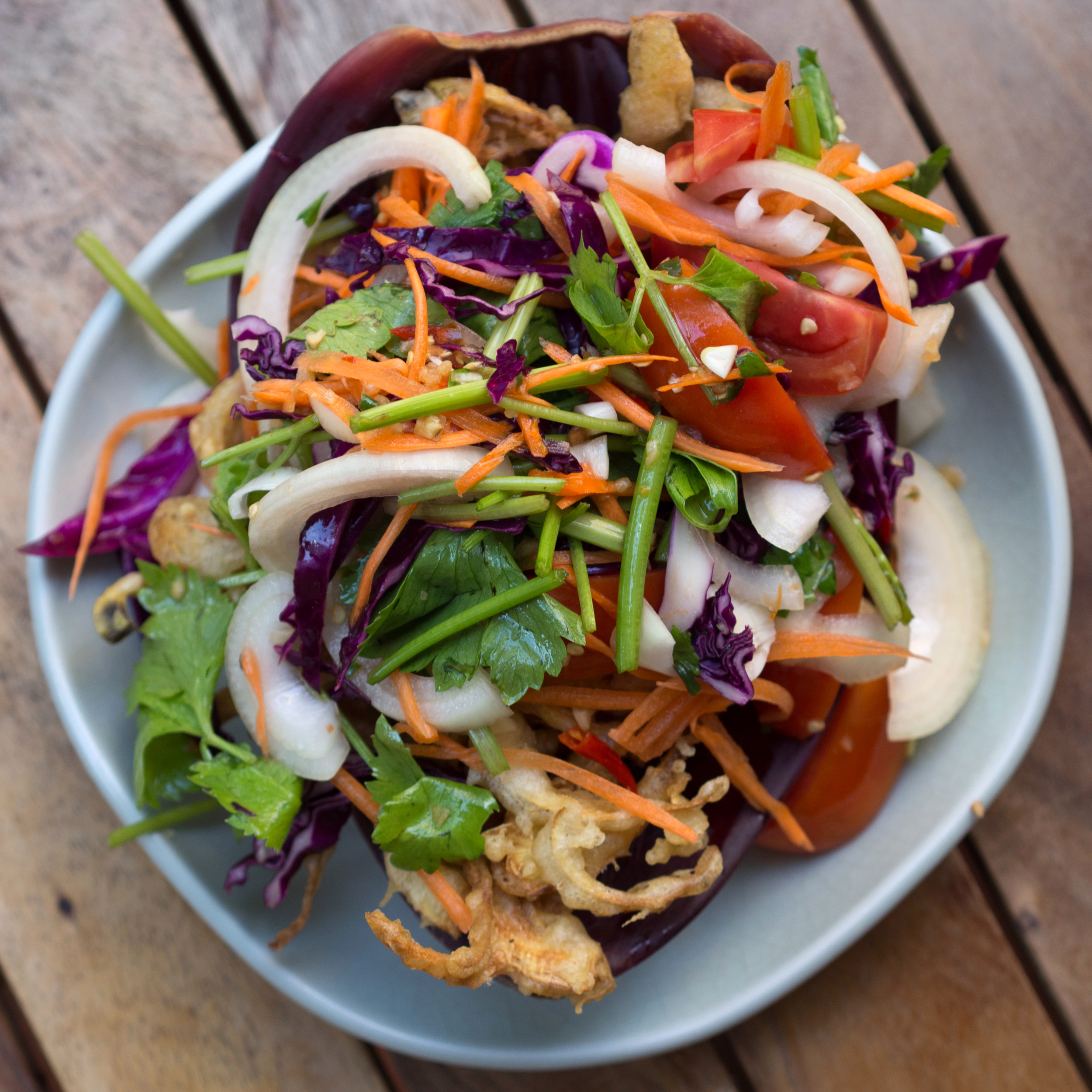
A salad made with deep-fried banana blossom at a vegetarian restaurant in Chiang Mai

In most towns and cities, traditional Buddhist vegetarian fare, without any meat or seafood products of any kind and also excluding certain strong tasting vegetables and spices, is sold at specialized vegetarian restaurants which can be recognized by a yellow sign with in Thai script the word che (Thai: เจ) or ahan che (Thai: อาหารเจ) written on it in red. These restaurants serve what can be regarded as vegan food. Many Indian restaurants of the sizable Thai-Indian community will also have vegetarian dishes on offer, due to the fact that vegetarianism is held as an ideal by many followers of the Hindu faith. Indian vegetarian cuisine can incorporate dairy products and honey. Due to the increased demand for vegetarian food from foreign tourists, many hotels, guesthouses and restaurants that cater to them will now also have vegetarian versions of Thai dishes on their menu. Pescatarians would have very few problems with Thai cuisine due to the abundance of Thai dishes which only contain fish and seafood as their source of animal protein.

== Culinary diplomacy ==
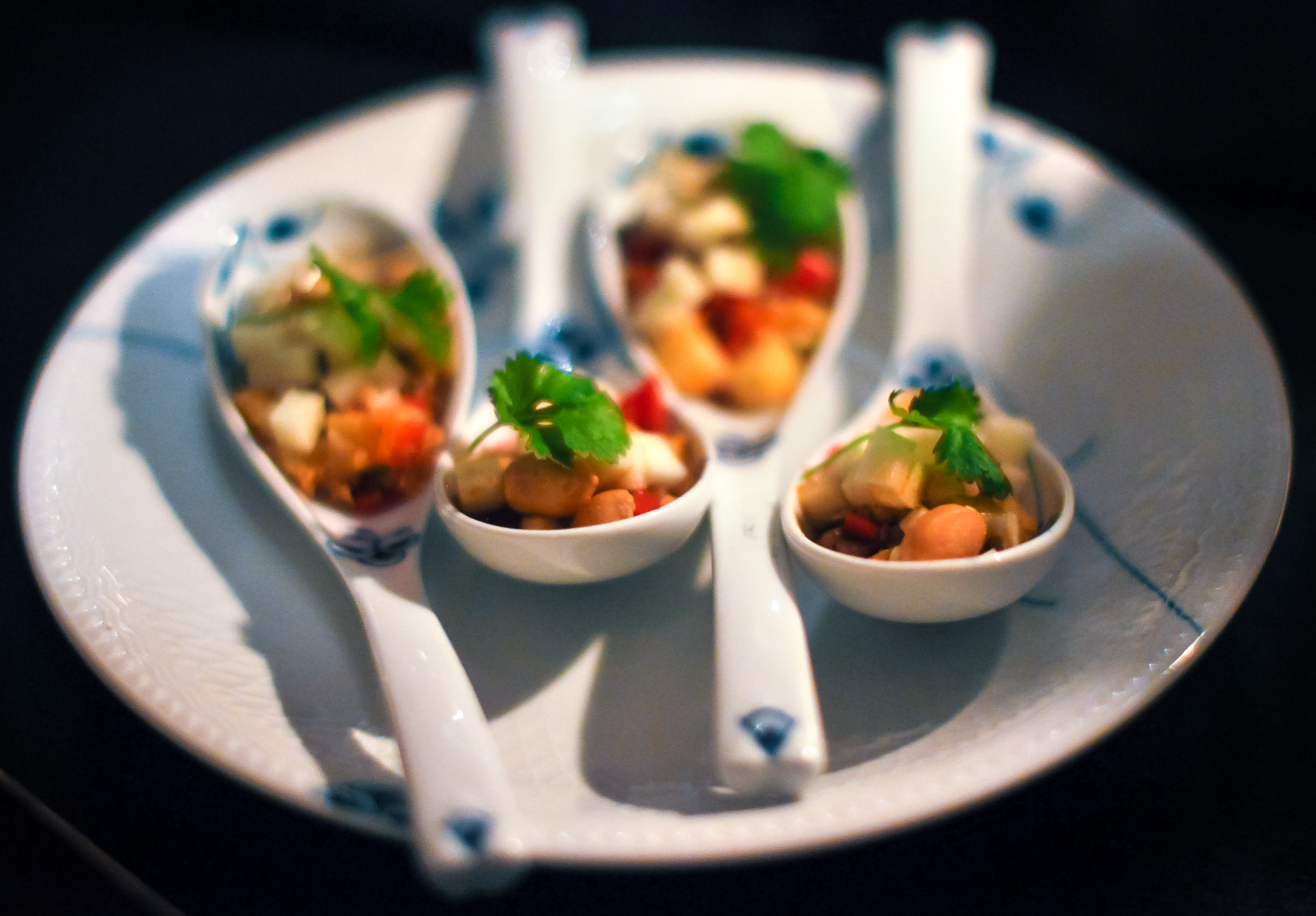
A dish of peanuts, ginger, and chili, Kiin Kiin (Copenhagen)

Thai cuisine only became well-known worldwide from the 1960s on, when Thailand became a destination for international tourism and US troops arrived in large numbers during the Vietnam War. The number of Thai restaurants went up from four in 1970s London to between two and three hundred in less than 25 years. The earliest attested Thai restaurant in the United States, "Chada Thai", opened its doors in 1959 in Denver, Colorado. It was run by the former newspaper publisher Lai-iad (Lily) Chittivej. The oldest Thai restaurant in London, "The Bangkok Restaurant", was opened in 1967 by Mr and Mrs Bunnag, a former Thai diplomat and his wife, in South Kensington.

The global popularity of Thai cuisine is seen as an important factor in promoting tourism, and also increased exports of Thailand's agricultural sector. From the 2000s, it was developed as a deliberate gastrodiplomacy. The Thaksin administration (2001–2006) launched the "Kitchen of the World" campaign early in its tenure to promote Thai cuisine internationally, with a yearly budget of 500 million baht. It provided loans and training for restaurateurs seeking to establish Thai restaurants overseas; established the "Thai Select" certification program which encouraged the use of ingredients imported from Thailand; and promoted integration between Thai investors, Thai Airways, and the Tourism Authority of Thailand with Thai restaurants overseas.

The "Global Thai" program, launched in 2002, was a government-led culinary diplomacy initiative. It aimed to boost the number of Thai restaurants worldwide to 8,000 by 2003 from about 5,500 previously. By 2011, that number had swelled to more than 10,000 Thai restaurants worldwide.

The program was explained in Thailand: Kitchen of the World, an e-book published to promote the program. The point of the e-book: "In the view of the Export Promotion Department, Thai restaurants have a good business potential that can be developed to maintain a high level of international recognition. To achieve that goal, the department is carrying out a public relations campaign to build up a good image of the country through Thai restaurants worldwide."

The Department of Export Promotion of the Thai Ministry of Commerce offers potential restaurateurs plans for three different "master restaurant" types—from fast food to elegant—which investors can choose as a prefabricated restaurant plan. Concomitantly, the Export-Import Bank of Thailand offered loans to Thai nationals aiming to open restaurants abroad, and the Small and Medium Enterprise Development Bank of Thailand set up an infrastructure for loans of up to US$3 million for overseas food industry initiatives, including Thai restaurants.

One survey conducted in 2003 by the Kellogg School of Management and Sasin Institute showed that Thai cuisine ranked fourth when people were asked to name an ethnic cuisine, after Italian, French, and Chinese cuisine. When asked "what is your favourite cuisine?", Thailand's cuisine came in at sixth place, behind the three aforementioned cuisines, and Indian and Japanese cuisine.

In June 2009, the Tourism Authority of Thailand organised a conference to discuss these matters at the Queen Sirikit National Convention Centre in Bangkok. TAT Governor Seree Wangpaichitr said, "This conference was long overdue. The promotion of Thai cuisine is one of our major niche-market targets. Our figures show that visitors spent 38.8 billion baht on eating and drinking last year, up 16% over 1997."

In the list of the "World's 50 most delicious foods", compiled by CNN in 2011, som tam stands at place 46, nam tok mu at 19, tom yam kung at 8, and massaman curry stands on first place as most delicious food in the world. In a reader's poll held a few months later by CNN, Nam tok mu came in at 36, Thai fried rice at 24, green curry at 19, massaman curry at 10, and Thai som tam, pad thai, and tom yam kung at six, five, and four.

In 2012, the British Restaurant Magazine included Nahm Bangkok of chef David Thompson in its yearly list of The World's 50 Best Restaurants.

== Awards ==
Thai chefs of the Thailand Culinary Academy took second place in the Gourmet Team Challenge (Practical) of the FHC China International Culinary Arts Competition 14 in Shanghai, China on 14–16 November 2012. They won the IKA Culinary Olympic 2012 competition held in Erfurt, Germany between 5–10 October 2012, where they received four gold and one silver medal.

In 2011, the James Beard Foundation Award for Best Chef in the Northwestern United States, was presented to Andy Ricker of restaurant "Pok Pok" in Portland, Oregon, and for Best Chef in the Southwestern United States to Saipin Chutima of restaurant "Lotus of Siam" in Winchester, Nevada.

=== Michelin stars ===
Three restaurants that specialize in Thai cuisine, but are owned by non-Thai chefs, have received Michelin stars:

- 2002 – 2011 "Nahm" in London, run by chef David Thompson
- 2009 – "Kiin Kiin" in Copenhagen, run by chef Henrik Yde-Andersen and Lertchai Treetawatchaiwong
- 2015 – "Pok Pok NY" in New York City, run by chef Andy Ricker

== Culinary tours and cooking courses ==
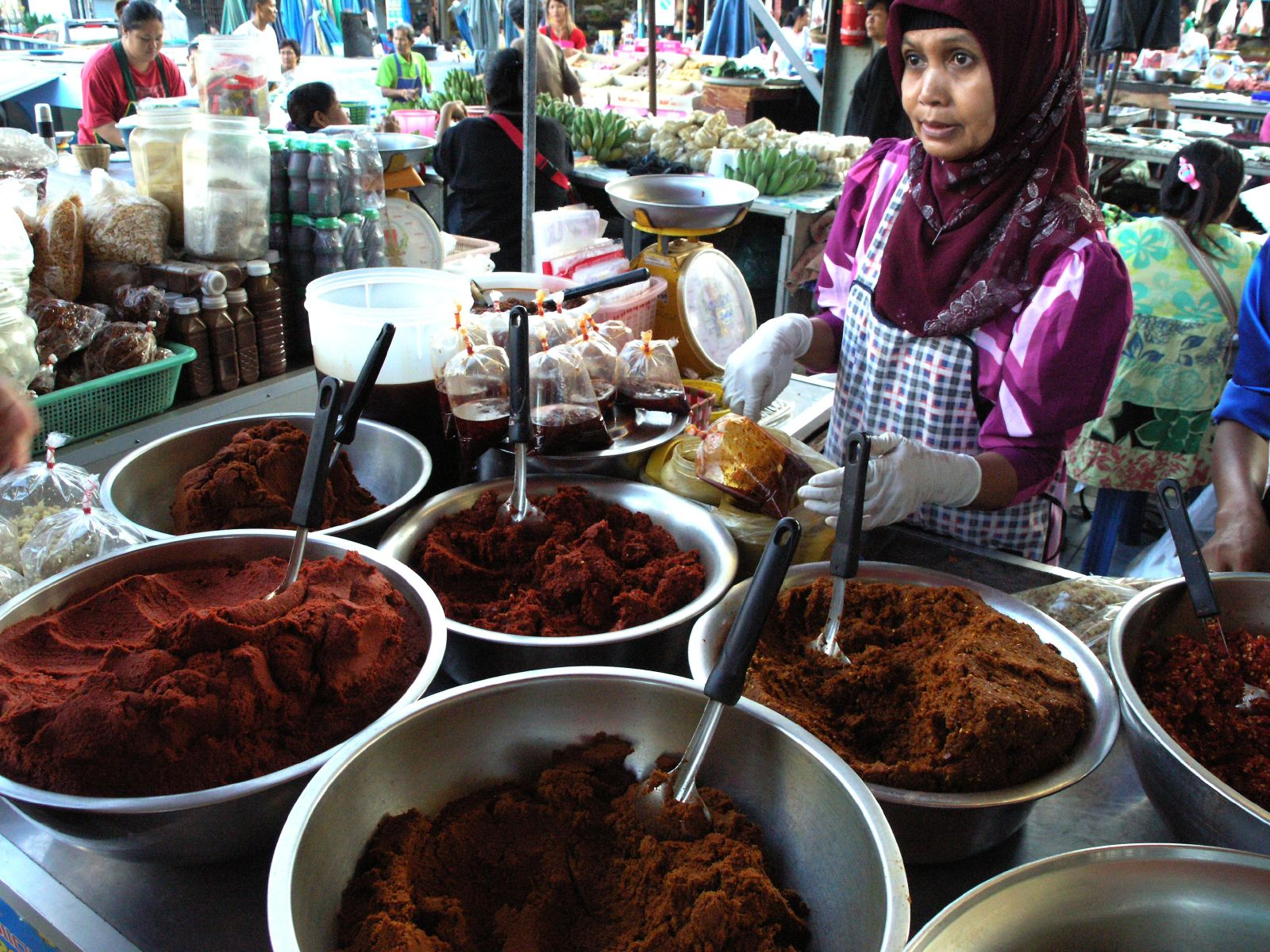
Food tours and cooking courses in Thailand almost always include a trip to the local market.

Culinary tours of Thailand have gained popularity in recent years. Alongside other forms of tourism in Thailand, food tours have carved a niche for themselves. Many companies offer culinary and cooking tours of Thailand and many tourists visiting Thailand attend cooking courses offered by hotels, guesthouses and cooking schools.

== Governmental interventions ==
The Thai government believes that a substandard Thai restaurant meal served abroad "...sabotages the country's reputation." To ensure the quality of Thai food abroad, the government has over the years initiated a series of programs designed to create universal standards for Thai food.

In 2003 the Ministry of Finance sent officials to the US to award certificates to deserving restaurants. On their return the project was abandoned.

Soon thereafter, the Ministry of Labor created Krua Thai Su Krua Lok ('Thai kitchen goes global'). Its centerpiece was a 10-day Thai cooking course for those who wanted to prepare Thai food overseas. The effort was short-lived.

After some officials had a bad Thai meal abroad, in 2013 the Yingluck administration had the idea of standardising Thai food everywhere. The National Food Institute (NFI) came up with a program called Rod Thai Tae ('authentic Thai taste'). A parallel effort was called the "Thai Delicious" project.

=== Thai Delicious project ===
Thailand's National Innovation Agency (NIA), a public organization under the Thai Ministry of Science and Technology, spearheaded a 30 million baht (US$1 million), effort by the government to:

- Develop Thai recipes with "authentic taste" and establish them as standard recipes
- Develop biosensor equipment to analyze and evaluate taste and flavors
- Develop institutional food (ready-to-cook products) based on the standardized recipes to meet the demand for Thai food in foreign countries
- Provide a food certification service as well as training for local and foreign chefs working in Thai restaurants worldwide

The agency has posted 11 "authentic" recipes for tom yam kung (nam sai), tom yam kung (nam khon), pad thai, Massaman curry, kaeng khiao wan (green curry), kaeng lueang (southern Thai sour curry), golek chicken sauce, khao soi, sai ua (northern Thai sausage), nam phrik num (green pepper chili paste), and nam phrik ong (northern Thai chili paste). These recipes were featured at a gala dinner promoting "Authentic Thai Food for the World", held at the Plaza Athénée Hotel Bangkok on 24 August 2016 at which Thailand's Minister of Industry was the honored guest. By 2020, Thai Delicious plans to post over 300 Thai food recipes.

To determine authenticity, Thai researchers developed the "e-delicious machine", described as "...an intelligent robot that measures smell and taste in food ingredients through sensor technology in order to measure taste like a food critic." The machine evaluates food by measuring its conductivity at different voltages. Readings from 10 sensors are combined to produce a chemical signature. Because the machine cannot judge taste, the food is compared with a standard derived from a database of popular preferences for each dish. For tom yam, the spicy soup flavored with Kaffir lime leaves and coriander, researchers posted notices at Chulalongkorn University in Bangkok, requesting 120 tasters. The tasters—students, university staff, and area workers—were paid a few baht for their opinions. They were served 10 differently prepared soups and rated each one. The winning soup was declared the standard, and its chemical characteristics were programmed into the machine. When testing food, the machine returns a numerical score from one to 100. A score lower than 80 is deemed "not up to standard". The machine cost about US$100,000 to develop. Restaurants that follow officially sanctioned recipes can affix a "Thai Delicious" logo to their menus. Each machine sold for 200,000 baht. This project was shelved.

The Thai Delicious project has been criticized, the main rationale being that "Standardisation is the enemy of Thai food." Some observers think, however, that the quality of Thai food, at least in the US, is declining with its increased popularity, a state of affairs that Thai Delicious aims to fix.

In August 2018, Thailand's Ministry of Commerce kicked off a project called "Thai Select". It issues certificates in three grades to domestic Thai restaurants: gold (five stars); red (four stars); and orange (three stars). The goal is to enable tourists to Thailand to choose a worthy restaurant.

Culture Minister Vira Rojpojchanarat announced in 2018 that between 2020 and 2024, his ministry will investigate ways to preserve authentic Thai cuisine from the increasing influence of foreign dishes. "Unique in its preparation with recipes handed down for generations, Thai culinary art needs better protection against foreign influences which are now changing the look and taste of certain local dishes," he warned. The plan will conform to the Convention for the Safeguarding of the Intangible Cultural Heritage, initiated by the United Nations Educational, Scientific and Cultural Organisation (UNESCO). The 2003 convention intends to protect the "uses, representations, expressions, knowledge and techniques that communities, groups and, in some cases, individuals, recognised as an integral part of their cultural heritage".

=== Salt reduction efforts ===
On average, Thai people consume 4,300 mg of sodium per day, twice the WHO's recommended maximum. Thai street food is one of the top three contributors to high salt intake. The Public Health Ministry has embarked on a program to reduce the population's salt consumption by 30 percent.

== See also ==
- List of Thai dishes (includes names in Thai script)
- List of Thai ingredients (includes names in Thai script)
- List of Thai khanom
- List of Thai restaurants
- List of Thai desserts and snacks
- Tourism in Thailand
- Culture of Thailand
- Thai curry
- Thai salads
- Filipino cuisine
- Indian cuisine
- Indonesian cuisine
- Khmer royal cuisine
