= Nam tok mu =

Thai and Lao pork salad

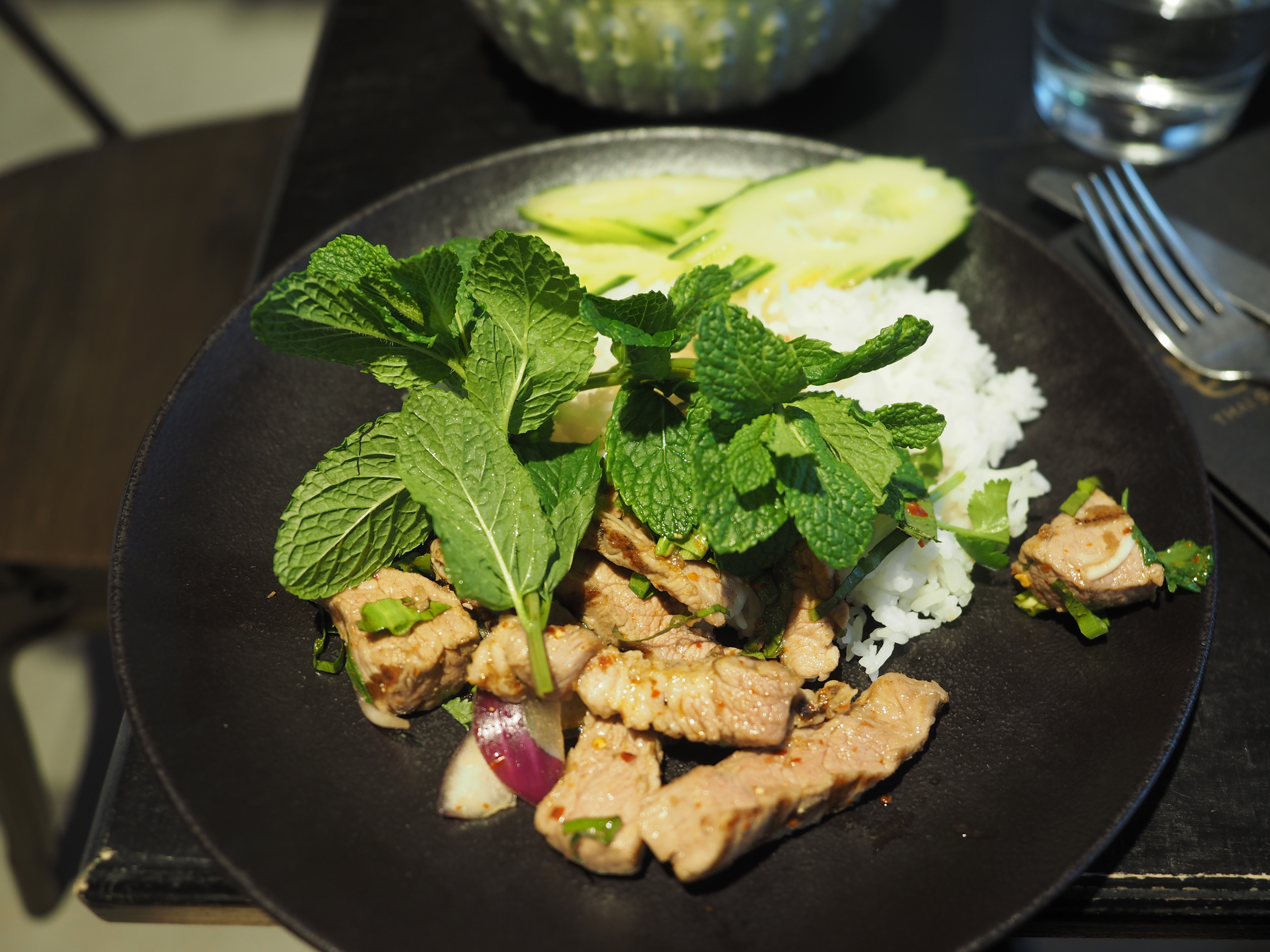
Nam tok kho mu yang

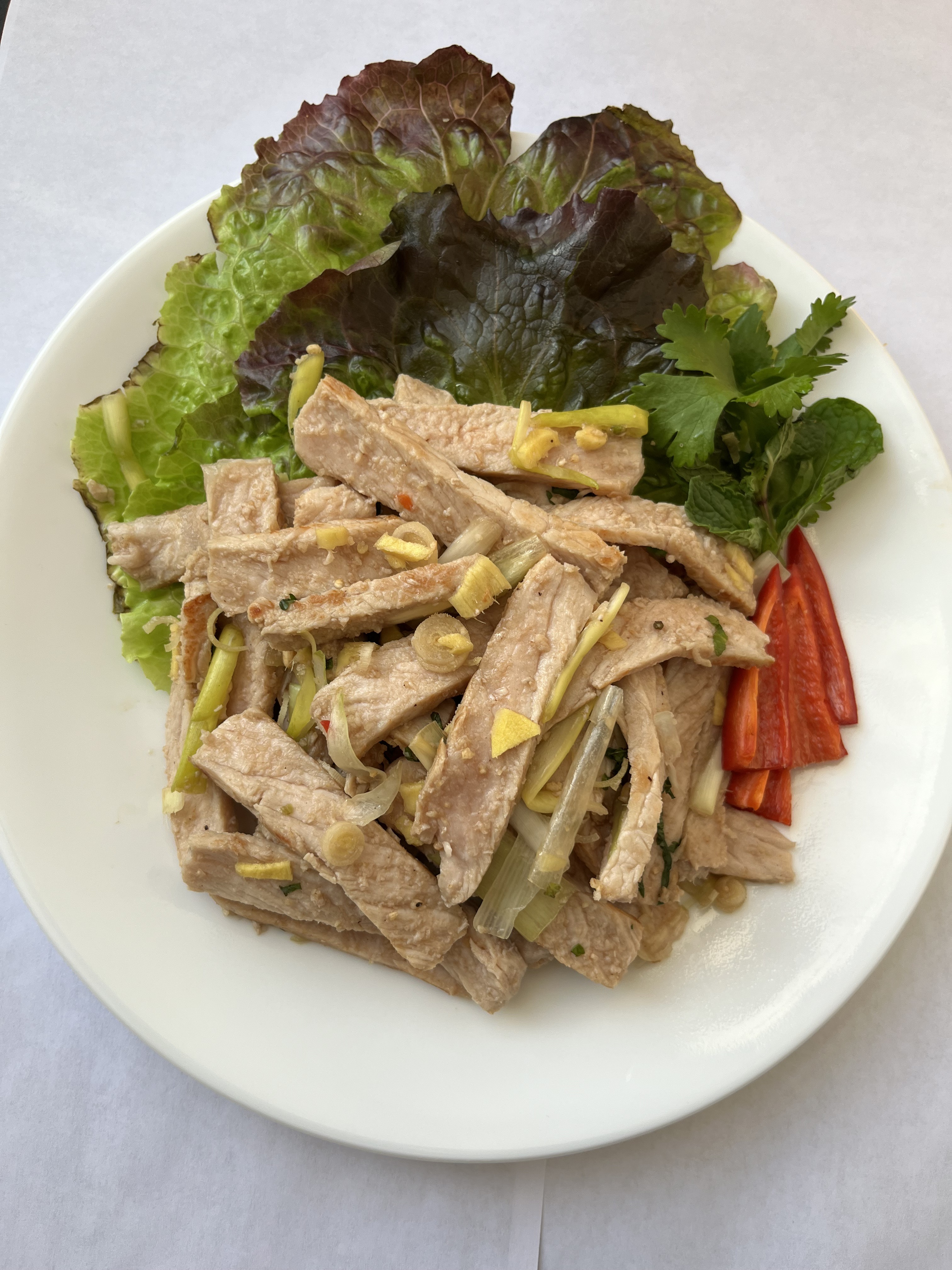
Lao mu nam tok

Nam tok mu (Thai: น้ำตกหมู, Thai pronunciation: [nám tòk mǔː]; Northeastern Thai: หมูน้ำตก, mu nam tok) is a salad of grilled and sliced pork in the Isan (northeastern Thai) and Lao culinary tradition. The pork is grilled, sliced thinly, and dressed with ground roasted sticky rice (khao khua), lime juice, fish sauce, dried chili flakes, shallots, and fresh herbs such as mint, cilantro (coriander leaf), and culantro (sawtooth coriander).

== Etymology ==
The name combines the Thai words nam (น้ำ, "water") and tok (ตก, "to fall"), translating literally as "waterfall." The compound refers to the juices and rendered fat that drip from the meat onto the charcoal during grilling, producing a sizzling sound and aromatic smoke that flavors the meat. Mu (หมู) means "pork," distinguishing the dish from nam tok neua (beef nam tok) and nam tok kai (chicken nam tok). In Laos, a closely related preparation is known as ping sin nam tok (ປີ້ງຊີ້ນນໍ້າຕົກ).

== Origin and regional context ==
Nam tok mu is part of the broader family of grilled-meat salads that originated in Isan (northeastern Thailand) and Laos, a region whose cuisine shares strong continuities across the Mekong river. The dish is closely related to larb, the more widely known Isan and Lao meat salad: the dressing components (lime juice, fish sauce, dried chilies, khao khua, shallots, and fresh herbs) are essentially identical, but the meat in larb is finely minced while in nam tok it is grilled in whole pieces and then sliced thinly across the grain.

In Lao cuisine, cooks often use the fermented fish paste padaek in addition to or in place of fish sauce, producing a more pungent flavor profile.

== Preparation ==
The pork is typically a fattier cut, such as pork neck, shoulder, or jowl, which retains moisture during grilling and slicing. It is sometimes marinated briefly with soy sauce, oyster sauce, fish sauce, or pepper before being grilled over charcoal until well-charred on the outside while remaining juicy inside. Unlike beef-based nam tok, which is often served with the meat cooked rare or medium, the pork in mu nam tok is usually cooked through to address the food-safety concerns associated with undercooked pork.

After grilling, the meat is sliced thinly and tossed while still warm with the dressing and aromatics. Khao khua The toasted and ground sticky-rice powder, is added last; it serves as a thickener, contributes a coarse, nutty crunch, and lends a characteristic smoky aroma. The intended balance is sour (from lime), salty (from fish sauce), and spicy (from chili flakes), with the freshness of mint, cilantro, and shallots cutting against the richness of the pork.

== Serving and accompaniments ==
Nam tok mu is most commonly eaten with sticky rice (khao niao), a staple of Isan and Lao cuisine. It is typically served alongside a platter of raw or lightly blanched vegetables, including cabbage, lettuce, cucumber slices, and yardlong beans (asparagus beans). The vegetables are eaten alongside the salad to balance the dish's bold acidity and chili heat.

The ingredients are common in Thai and Lao home kitchens and inexpensive to obtain, which has made nam tok mu a popular casual meal in Isan households and a frequent menu item at Thai and Lao restaurants worldwide.

== Related dishes ==
- Nam tok neua — the beef version of the dish, often regarded as the more commonly encountered variant in restaurants
- Larb (laap or laab) — the related minced-meat salad sharing the same dressing
- Ping sin nam tok — the Lao variant, which may use padaek in place of fish sauce
