= Khao khua =

Lao toasted rice powder

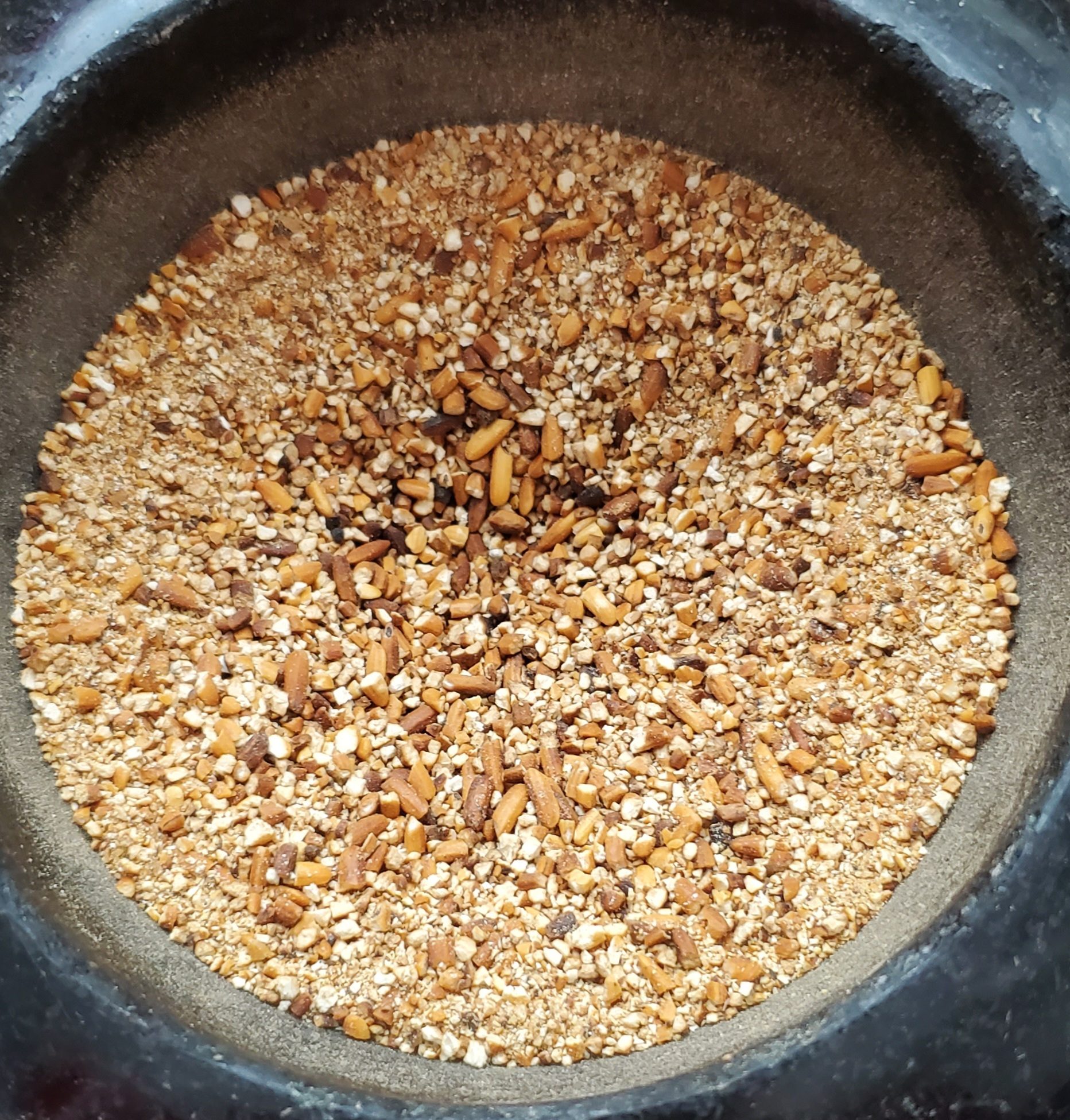
- Lao toasted rice powder for laab and jeow
- Alternative names: Toasted rice powder, roasted glutinous rice powder, ground roasted rice
- Type: Condiment
- Place of origin: Laos
- Region or state: Southeast Asia
- Associated cuisine: Lao cuisine
- Created by: Lao people
- Main ingredients: Glutinous rice

Khao khua (Lao: ເຂົ້າຂົ້ວ, pronounced [kʰȁw kʰȕa]) is a Lao toasted rice powder made from dry-roasted glutinous rice grains that are ground into a coarse powder. Originating in Laos, it is a staple ingredient in Lao cuisine, where it adds a nutty, smoky aroma, subtle crunch, and helps thicken sauces or absorb excess moisture in dishes. Khao khua is particularly essential in traditional salads like laab (also spelled larb or laap), considered the national dish of Laos, as well as nam tok and various dipping sauces such as jaew.

== Etymology ==
The name "khao khua" derives from Lao words: "khao" (ເຂົ້າ) meaning "rice," and "khua" (ຂົ້ວ) meaning "to dry-roast" or "to toast" in a pan without oil. This reflects the simple preparation method of toasting raw rice grains until aromatic and browned. In some contexts, it is also referred to as "toasted sticky rice powder," "roasted rice powder," or "ground roasted rice."

== History and cultural significance ==
Khao khua originates primarily from Laos, where it is widely used in traditional cuisine, especially in laab, the national dish. It was later adopted and integrated into the dishes of northeastern Thailand's Isan region due to shared Lao ethnic and cultural influences, as Isan has historical ties to Laos and a predominantly Lao-descended population. The significance of khao khua in Lao cuisine is well-documented in the works of Chaleunsilp Phia Sing (1898-1967), who served as the Master of Ceremonies and royal chef at the Luang Prabang palace to the kings of Laos. His handwritten notebooks, containing over 100 traditional recipes, were preserved and published posthumously as Traditional Recipes of Laos in 1981, edited by British diplomat and food writer Alan Davidson. Phia Sing's recipes highlight the essential role of khao khua in dishes like laab and yam yai, providing one of the most authoritative sources on pre-1975 Lao royal and folk cuisine, preserving culinary heritage that might otherwise have been lost after the end of the Lao monarchy. In the late 1950s, the book Kingdom of Laos: The Land of the Million Elephants and of the White Parasol includes descriptions of Lao meals and ingredients that capture the role of toasted rice powder in classic recipes like laab.

== Preparation ==
Khao khua is prepared by dry-toasting uncooked glutinous rice (also known as sticky or sweet rice) in a skillet or wok over medium-low heat for 10 - 25 minutes, stirring constantly to achieve an even golden-brown color and popcorn-like aroma. The rice is then cooled completely to prevent caking during grinding. It is ground into a coarse powder using a mortar and pestle (traditional method), spice grinder, or blender, aiming for a gritty texture rather than a fine flour. Optional aromatics like makrut lime leaves, lemongrass, or galangal slices can be added during toasting for enhanced fragrance, though plain versions are common for purity. Jasmine rice can substitute if sticky rice is unavailable, but it alters the authentic texture and flavor. The powder stores well in an airtight container for months.

== Culinary uses ==
Khao khua is primarily used in meat-based salads and sauces in Lao and Isan cuisines. It is a defining component in laab, added at the end to preserve crunch while balancing lime, fish sauce, chilies, and herbs with its nutty depth. It also features in nam tok (grilled meat salad), soups, and spicy dipping sauces like jeow (also spelled jaew), where it lends a crunchy texture and smoky-nutty flavor to varieties such as jeow mak kham (tamarind jeow) or jeow khao. Adaptations appear in neighboring cuisines, but it remains most prominent in Lao and Isan contexts, where its absence would make dishes like laab incomplete.
