= Jeow =

Laotian dipping sauce

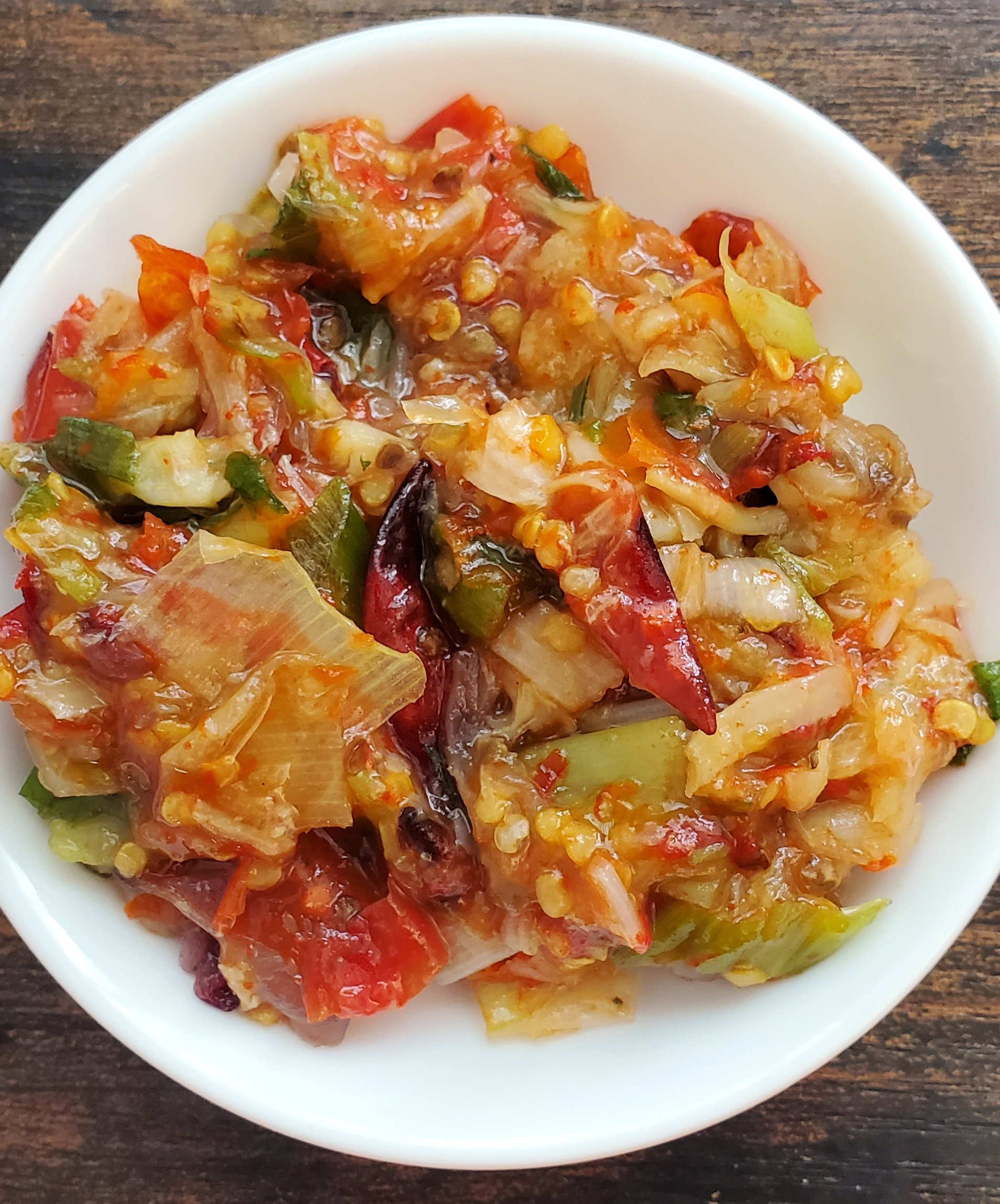
- Lao chili dip made from grilled peppers, garlic, and shallots, mashed in a mortar and seasoned with salt, padaek, and fish sauce
- Alternative names: Jaew, Jeaw, Cheo, Chaeo
- Type: Dipping sauce / Paste
- Place of origin: Laos
- Region or state: Southeast Asia
- Main ingredients: Chilies, garlic, shallots, fish sauce or padaek, herbs
- Variations: Jeow bong, jeow som, jeow mak len, jeow mak keua, jeow mak phet

Jeow (Lao: ແຈ່ວ; also spelled jaew, jeaw, jeo, cheo, or chaeo) is a category of traditional Lao dipping sauces or pastes originating from Laos. These condiments are typically spicy, umami-rich, and often smoky or fermented, made by pounding grilled or fresh ingredients such as chilies, garlic, shallots, herbs, and fish sauce or padaek (fermented fish paste). Jeow can range in consistency from thick, chunky pastes to thinner, more liquid sauces depending on the variety and preparation method.

Jeow serves as an essential accompaniment to sticky rice, grilled meats, fresh vegetables, and other staples, reflecting the communal eating style of Lao people.

The term "jeow" broadly means "sauce" or "dip" in Lao, encompassing a wide range of varieties that vary by region, season, and available ingredients. It shares similarities with Thai nam prik but is distinguished by its emphasis on fermented elements like padaek and rustic pounding techniques.

Jeow plays a key role in Lao meals, balancing flavors: spicy from chilies, savory from fermented fish, sour from lime or tamarind, and sometimes sweet from sugar or roasted ingredients. It is integral to everyday dining and ceremonial contexts, highlighting Laos' culinary heritage influenced by indigenous Tai-Lao traditions and historical trade.

== History ==
=== Pre-colonial origins ===
The roots of jeow trace back to the pre-colonial era of the Lan Xang kingdom (1353-1707). Early Lao condiments relied on indigenous ingredients like galangal, lemongrass, and padaek, pounded into pastes for dipping essential for preserving food in a tropical climate and enhancing glutinous rice and river fish diets.

Padaek, a thick fermented fish paste foundational to many jeow, has ancient ties to the Mekong region. Early variants likely used black pepper or ginger for heat, as chilies and tomatoes arrived later.

The earliest European observations of fermented fish preparations come from Dutch merchant Gerrit van Wuysthoff's (1641-1642) expedition to Lan Xang, documenting preserved river fish and pungent condiments in rice-based meals. Italian Jesuit missionary Giovanni Maria Leria (1642-1647), further described Lao diets of rice-fish with fermented condiments akin to padaek.

=== Introduction of new world ingredients ===
Chilies reached Southeast Asia via Portuguese trade in the 16th century, transforming dipping pastes into spicier forms by the 17th century. Tomatoes integrated by the 18th-19th centuries enabled varieties like jeow mak len.

=== Colonial and royal documentation ===
French colonial accounts (1893-1953) noted "piquant sauces" in Lao meals. Henri Mouhot (1858–1861) observed intense use of chili peppers in village foods, likely infusing early jeow-like pastes.

Étienne Aymonier, in his 1895 travel account Voyage dans le Laos, described a simple form of the condiment in the Meuong Leuy region: "In short, they hardly eat anything with their rice except this mixture of salt and chili that the Laos call cheo." This early transliteration of "cheo" refers to a basic chili-salt dipping paste, a precursor to more complex modern jeow varieties.

The most detailed documentation appears in Traditional Recipes of Laos, based on handwritten notebooks by Phia Sing (1898–1967), royal chef in Luang Prabang. Compiled in the 1950s-1960s from palace traditions, the book includes jeow varieties like jeow bong, a sweet-savory chili paste with galangal and buffalo skin, as a royal favorite.

Phia Sing also included a recipe for a version of jaew som mak nao (lime sauce), consisting of grilled chilies, then pounded with shallots and garlic. The mixture is seasoned with fish sauce, lime juice, and freshly chopped coriander. The palace version added boiled mince pork for extra depth.

However, the most common everyday version of jeow som is simpler, consisting of fresh ingredients pounded together in a mortar and pestle or blended in a food processor. It is typically served with grilled meats, fish, steamed vegetables, and sticky rice.

== Varieties ==
Jeow includes many types:

- Jeow bong (also cheo bong): Sweet-savory Luang Prabang paste with galangal.
- Jeow som: Sour fresh chili dip with lime and fish sauce (often more liquid).
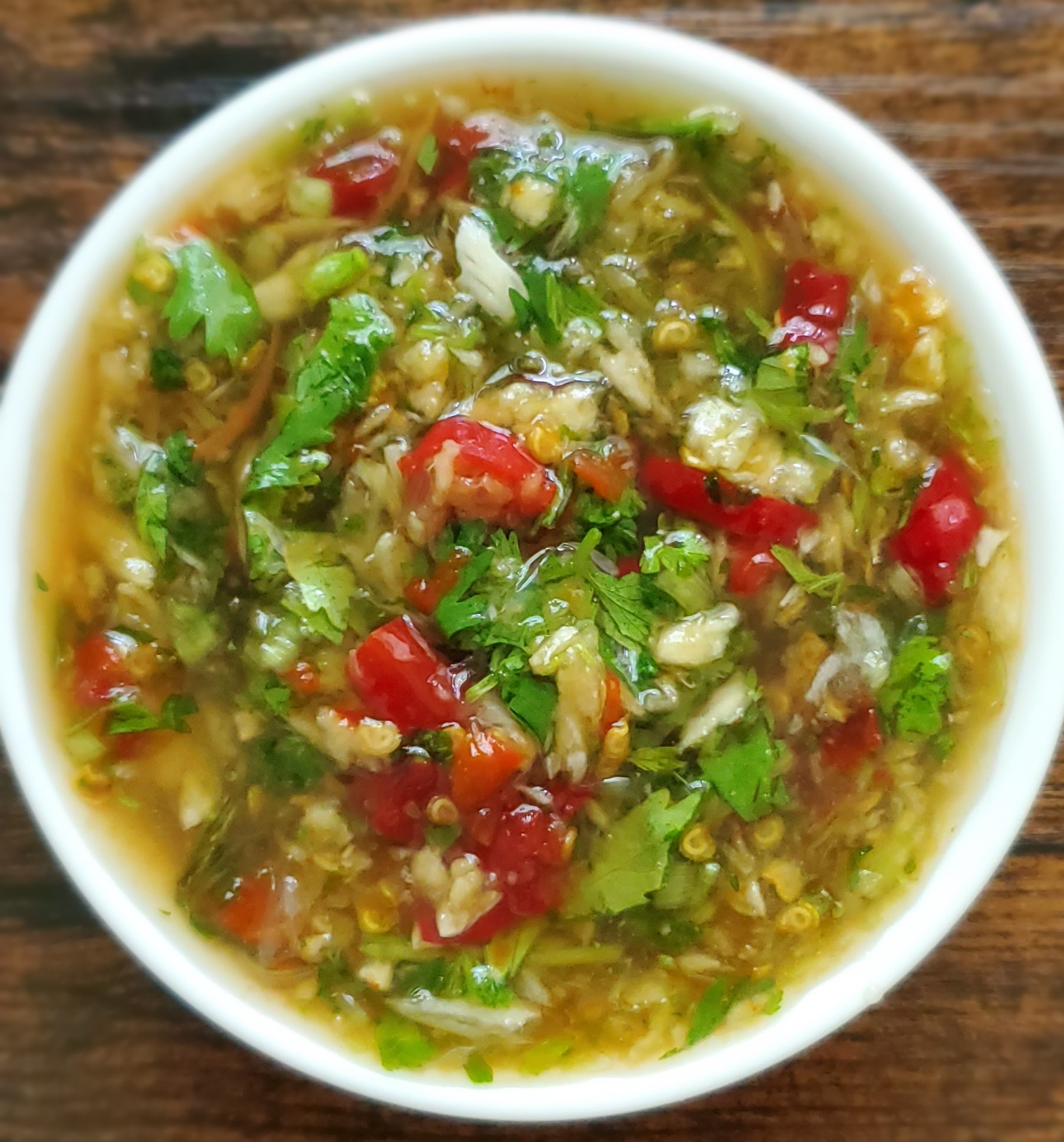
  Lao dipping sauce/condiment made with chili, garlic, fish sauce, lime juice, and coriander
- Jeow mak len: Roasted tomato-based, smoky.

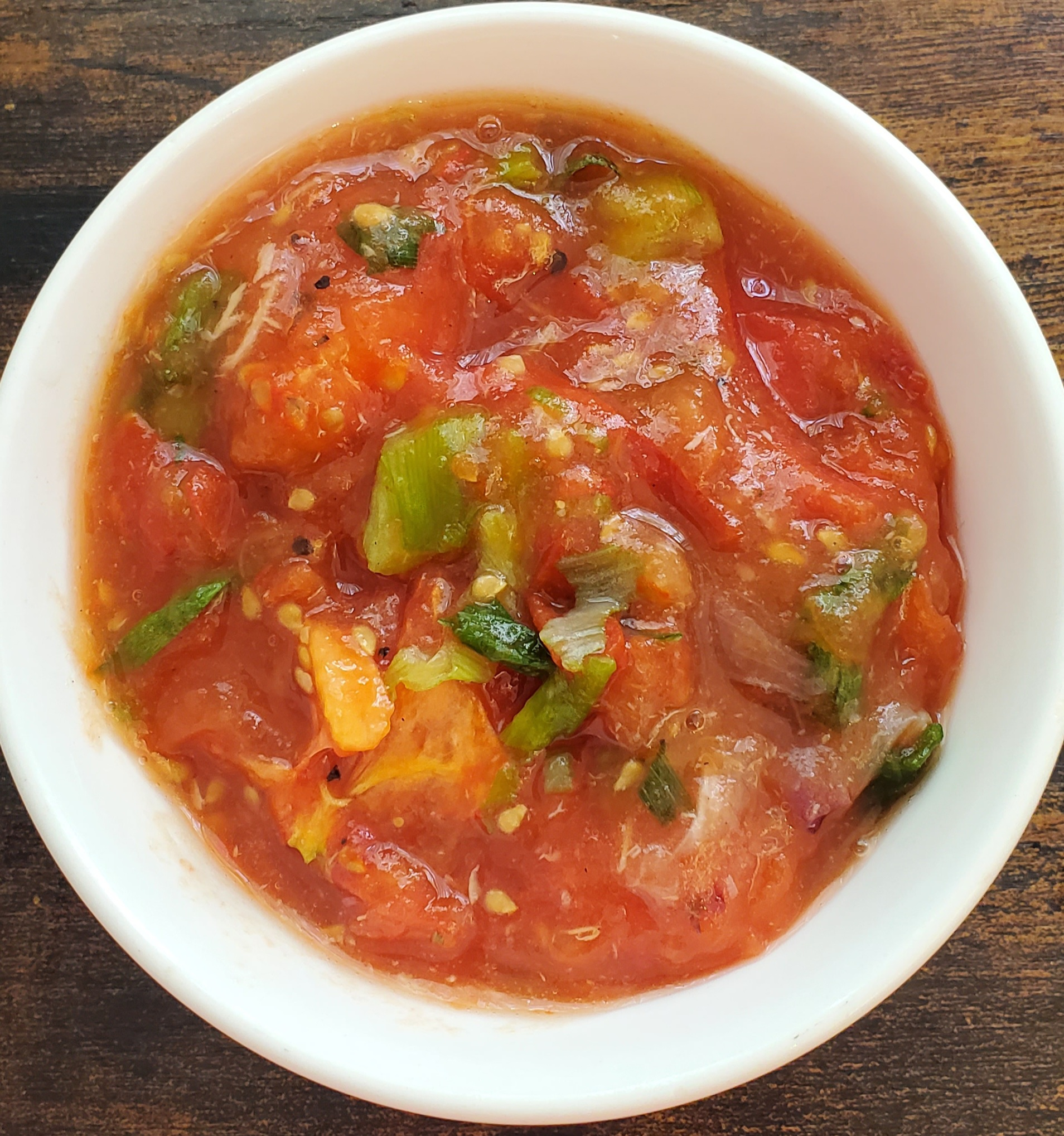
Lao tomato dip made from grilled tomatoes, garlic, shallots, green onions, and fresh cilantro

- Jeow mak keua: Eggplant-based.

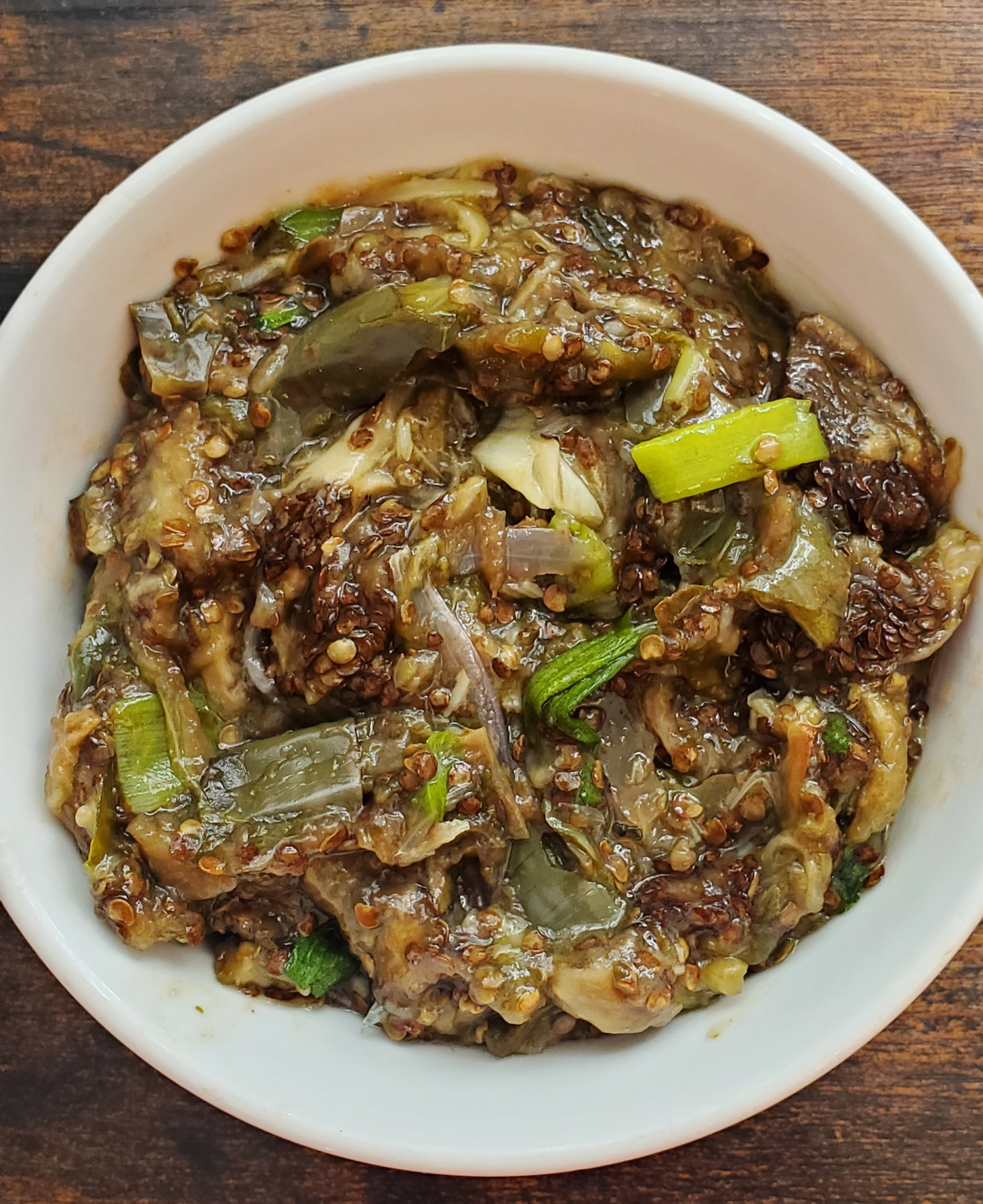
Lao eggplant dip made from grilled or boiled eggplants, peppers, and garlic

- Jeow mak phet: Grilled green or red pepper dip with fish sauce and padaek.
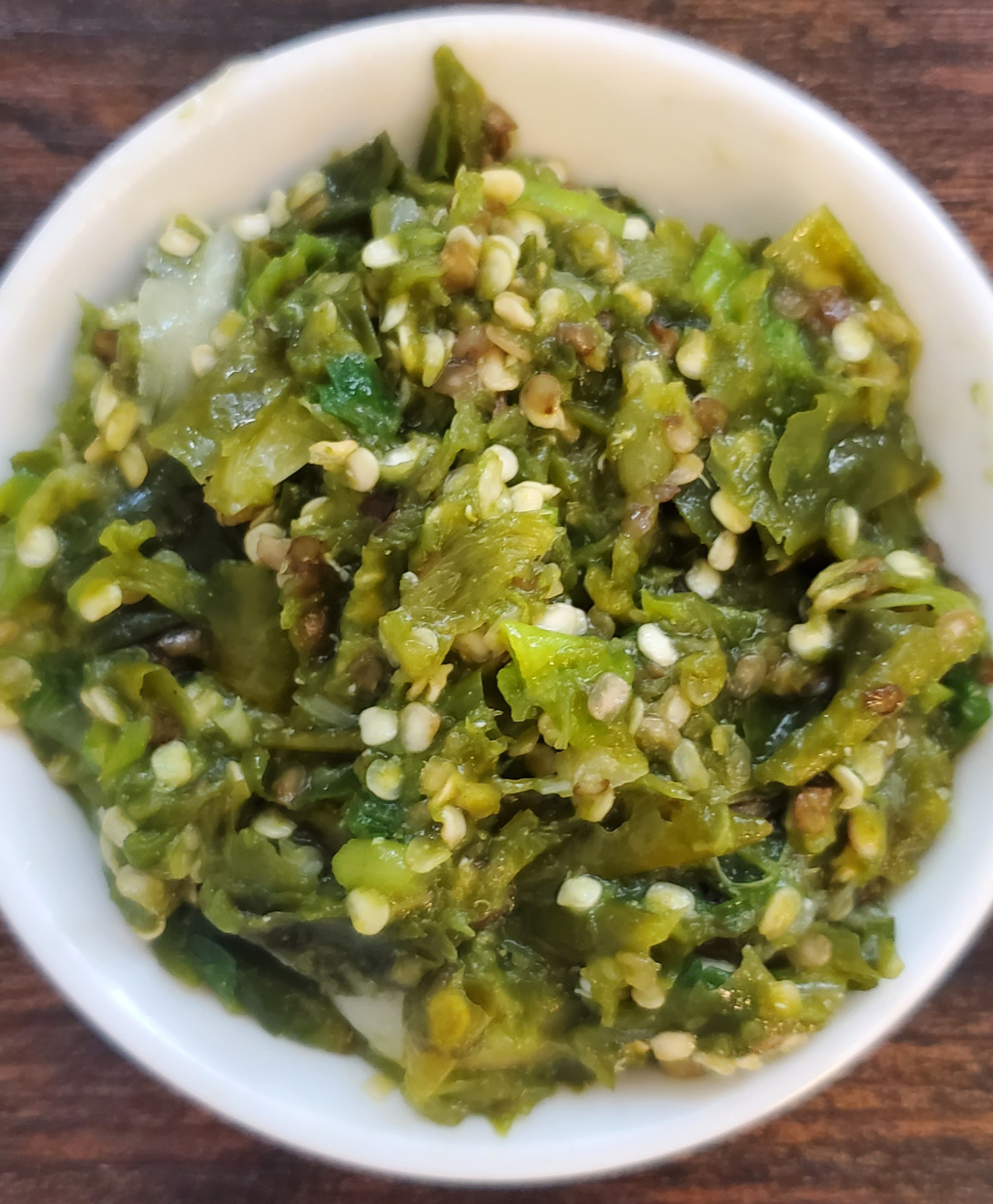
  Lao chili dipping sauce made with red or green chili
- Jeow het: Mushroom dip
- Jeow waan: also known as Jeow mak muang literally "mango sauce," named because it is most commonly paired with green or unripe mangoes.
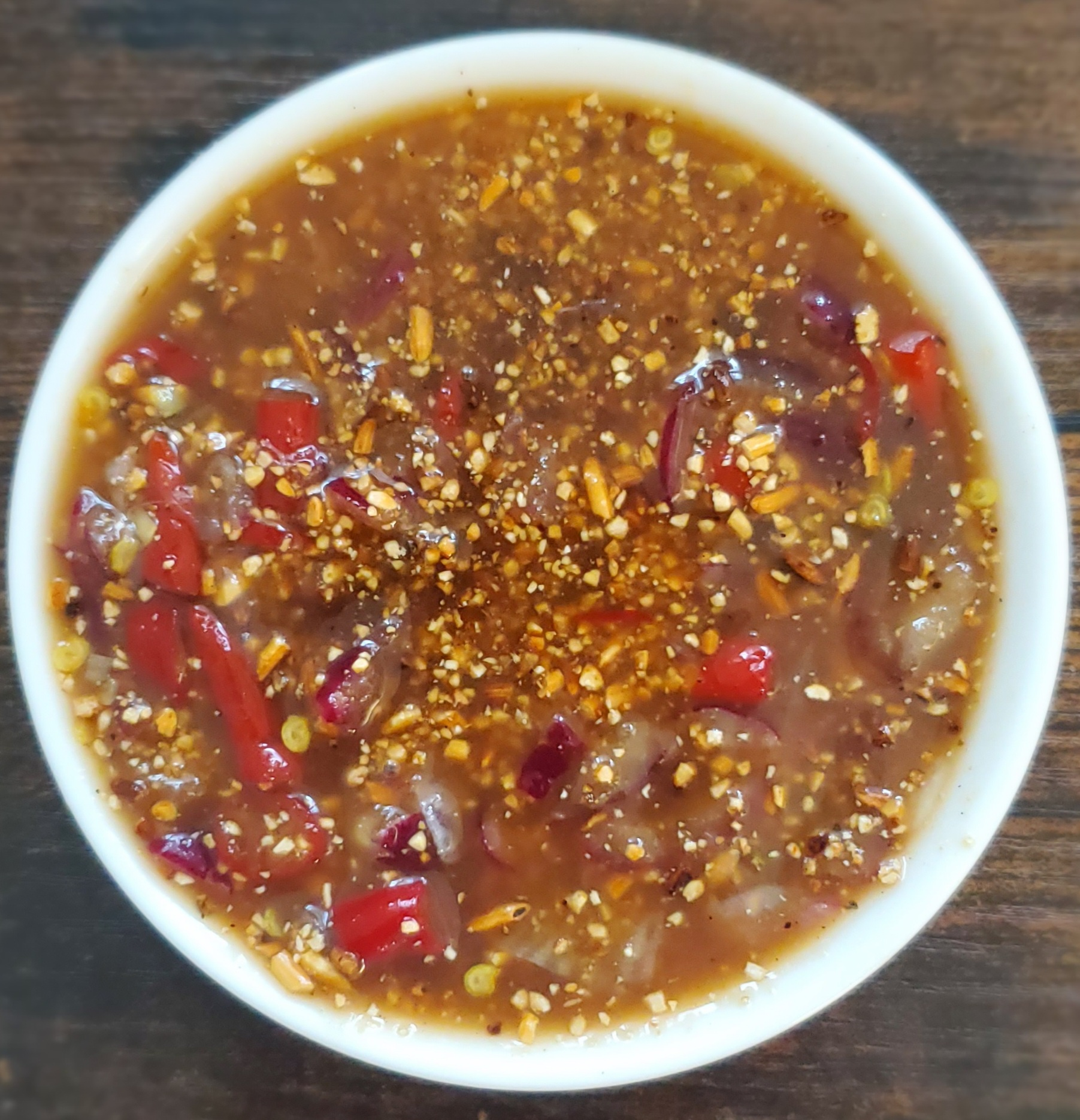
  Jeow waan or sweet jeow also known as jeow mak muang or dipping sauce for sour mangoes

== Preparation and ingredients ==
Jeow is traditionally prepared by pounding ingredients in a mortar and pestle, often after grilling them over embers for a smoky flavor. The consistency varies: some varieties are thick and paste-like (e.g., jeow bong), while others are thinner and more liquid (e.g., jeow som, which incorporates more lime juice and fish sauce). Core elements include chilies, garlic, shallots, padaek or fish sauce, and herbs.

== Cultural significance ==
Jeow embodies communal dining, tied to festivals and Lao identity through bold flavors and sticky rice pairing.
