= Larb =

National dish of Laos

Laab
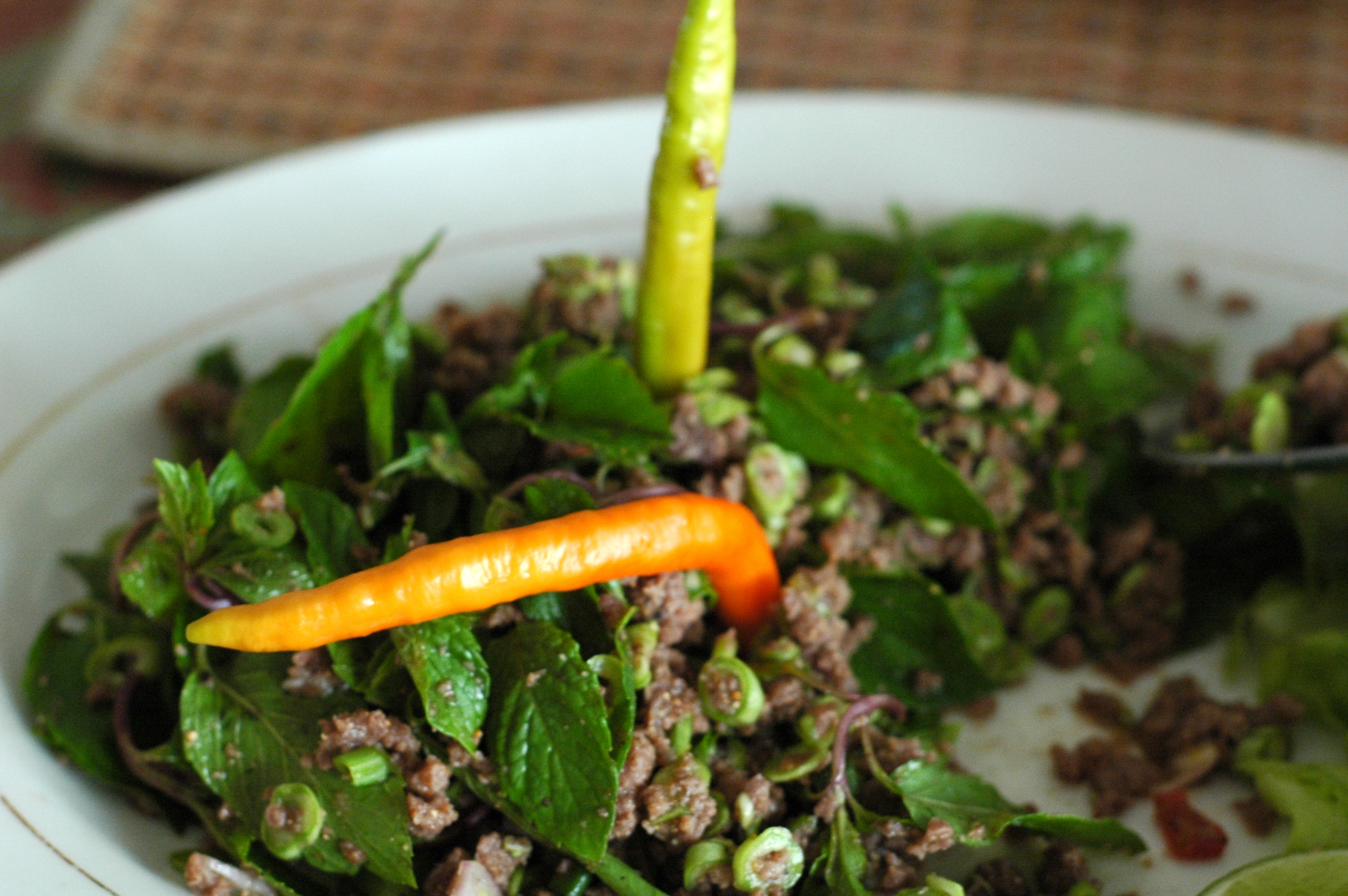
- Laab made with cooked beef in Vientiane, Laos
- Alternative names: Larb, Lap, Larp, Lahp, Lahb
- Type: Salad
- Place of origin: Laos
- Created by: Lao
- Main ingredients: Meat (chicken, beef, duck, turkey, pork, or fish)
- Variations: Several across the world

Laab / Larb (Lao: ລາບ; Thai: ลาบ, RTGS: lap, pronounced [lâːp], also spelled laap, larp, or lahb) is a type of Lao meat salad that is the national dish of Laos, along with green papaya salad and sticky rice. Laab in the Lao language is a noun that refers to meat or other flesh that has been finely chopped and pounded. It is also considered a food of good luck in both Laos and Thailand because it has homonyms that mean 'lucky' in both languages, derived from लाभ in Sanskrit. Laab is of Lao origin, but is also eaten in other regions, most prominently the neighboring former Lan Xang territory, or modern day Laos and the northeastern and northern areas of Thailand, Isan and Lanna where the Lao have extended their influence. Other local variants of laab also feature in the cuisines of the Tai peoples of Shan State, Burma, and Yunnan Province, China.

== History ==
Commissioned by the Chinese Qianlong emperor in 1751, the Qing Imperial Illustrations of Tributary Peoples describes the Lao people as the following: "The Laowo (Lao) are customarily called Wojia [...] They like to eat raw meat."

Étienne François Aymonier, who visited Laos in 1883, described laab as a favorite dish of Lao people – a mixture of chopped onions or scallions, lemongrass leaves, fermented fish and chili mixed with fresh and boiled fish. The dish was eaten with steamed sticky rice. Another French visitor, Doctor Estrade, who arrived in 1893, described laab as a Lao main dish made with boiled fish, chili and ground roasted sticky rice.

Depending on the method of preparation, it may be known by different names, including nam tok, goi/saa, yum/sua, and can be made with beef, buffalo, chicken, duck, fish, pork, shrimp, game meat, mushroom or even algae. Laab can be served raw, which is known as laab diip (raw) or aharn suer (tiger food), or cooked, and usually served with a soup made with the bones of the meat being used.

Historically, laab dishes were more common amongst the aristocracy and traditional recipes for laab served to Laotian royalty are in a collection of handwritten recipes from Phia Sing (1898–1967), royal chef and master of ceremonies. Laab is considered to be an auspicious and lucky dish because traditionally meat was not readily available, and most Laotians would normally eat laab at special occasions, such as wedding, New Year celebrations and festivals. Many Laotians will bless their family and guests with a meal consisting of laab for luck and good fortune. During the New Year celebration, many Lao families believe that eating laab on day one of the three-day celebration will bring good fortune for the rest of the year.

Prior to the collapse of the monarchy, in Laotian high society, servants were never allowed to prepare the best and most delicate dishes. The women of Laotian high society considered it an honorable task and great opportunity to display their culinary talents to prepare laab for their esteemed guests. Among ordinary Laotians, when preparing laab, housewives would prepare the ingredients in separate containers as a mise en place, leaving the final honor of mixing all the ingredients in a large bowl to the head of the household. As tradition goes, the head of the family would start with malaxating the mincemeat – softening and incorporating it with a cupful of stock from the soup, then adding the toasted ground rice, pepper powder, garlic, salt, padaek sauce and finally chopped aromatics before serving.

Laab has a meaning in the Lan Na dialect (1292–1775), the neighboring kingdom of Lan Xang (1353–1707, present day Laos). The name derived from the full word of "จิ๊นลาบ", the word "จิ๊น" translates to animal meat while "ลาบ" means to chop into smaller pieces or mince in Lanna script (closely linked to Tai Tham). However, in ancient Lanna dialect, the word “ฟัก” ("fak") was always used for "mince".

In 2026, Laos submitted an application to UNESCO seeking to declare laab as Intangible Cultural Heritage.

== Types ==
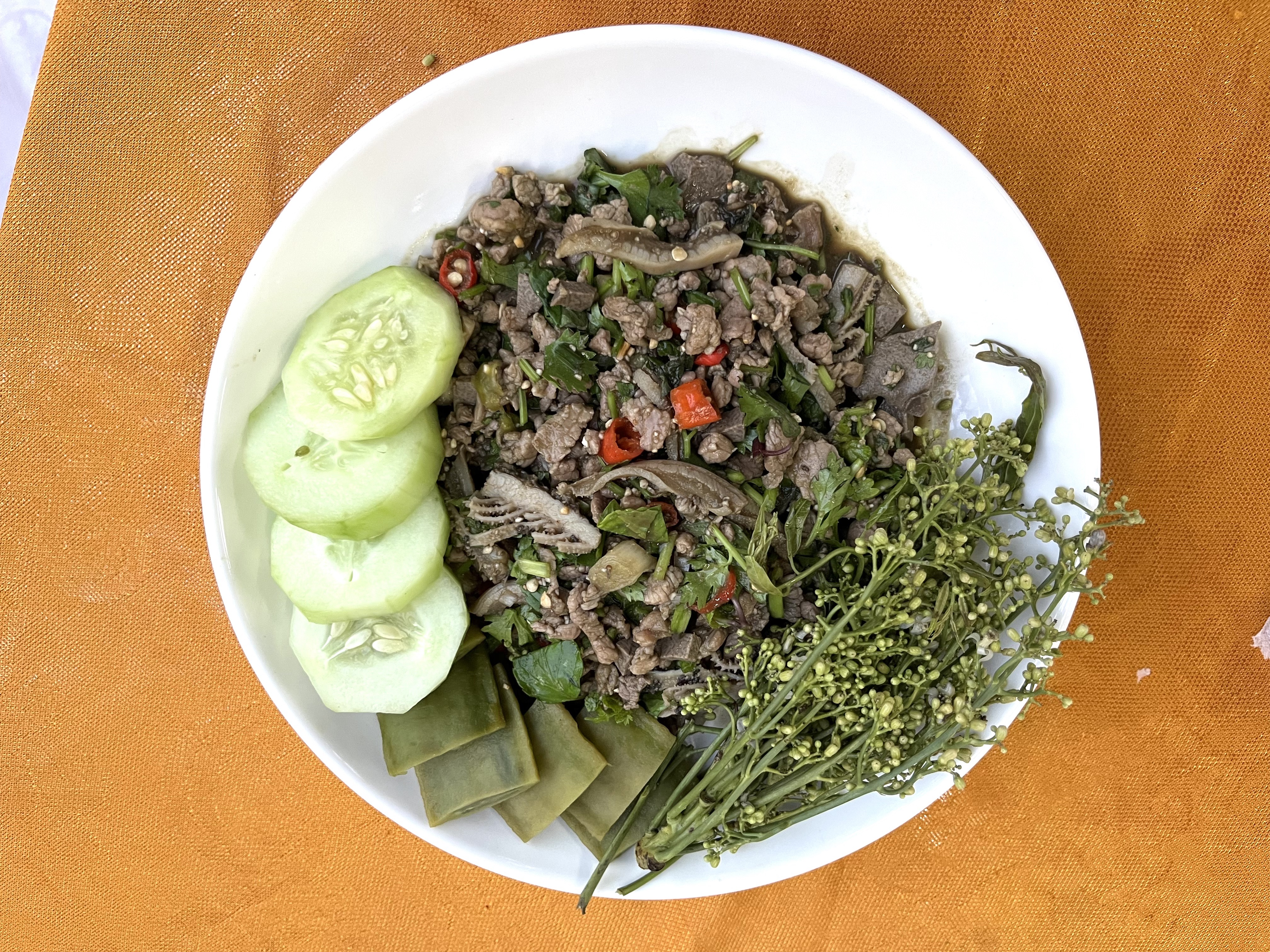
Lao bile laab (laab Pia in Lao) made with cooked meat, tripes, and bile

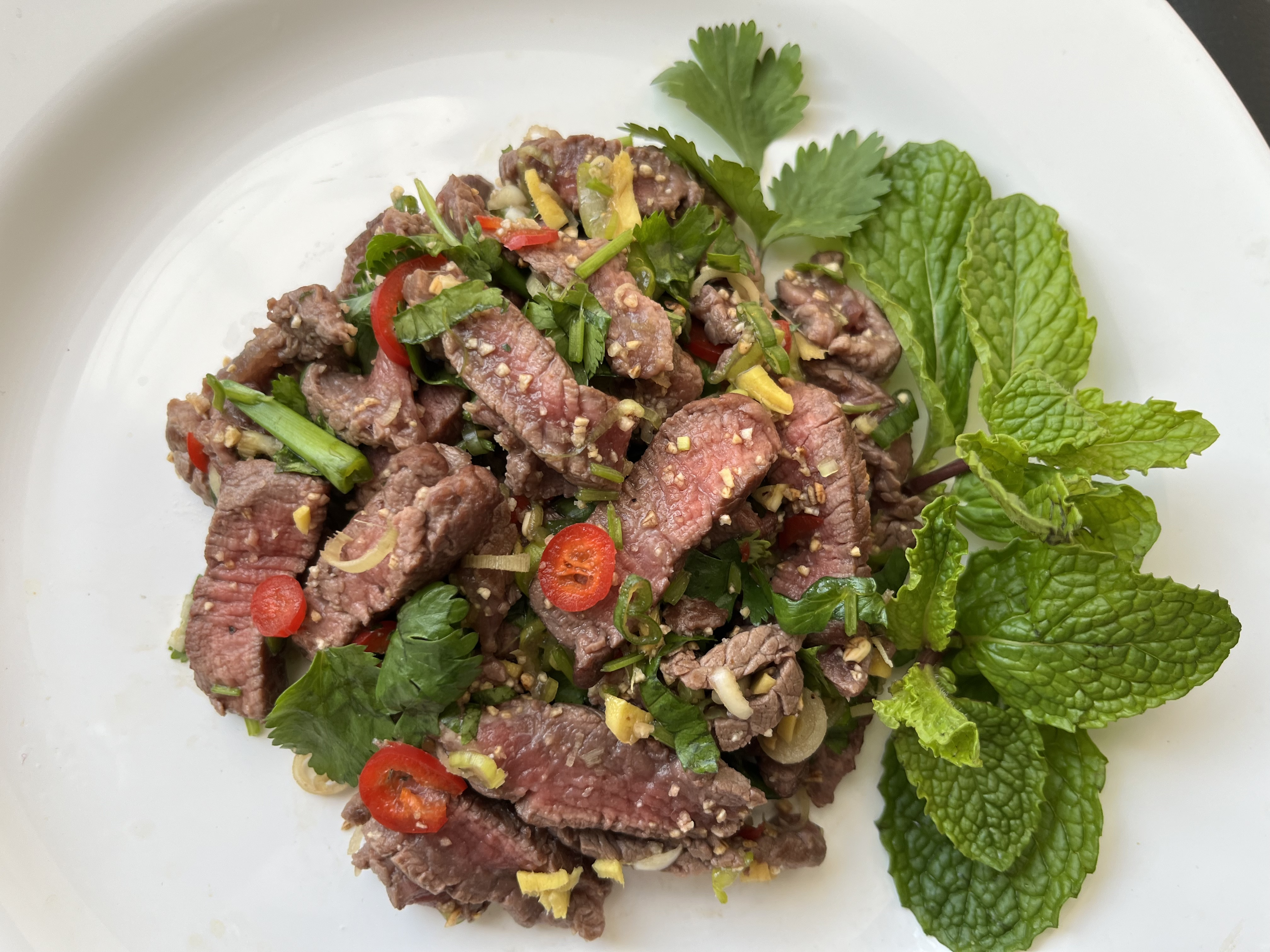
Ping sin nam tok is a variation of Lao laab dish made with beef steak and sometimes enjoyed as an appetizer with aperitif.

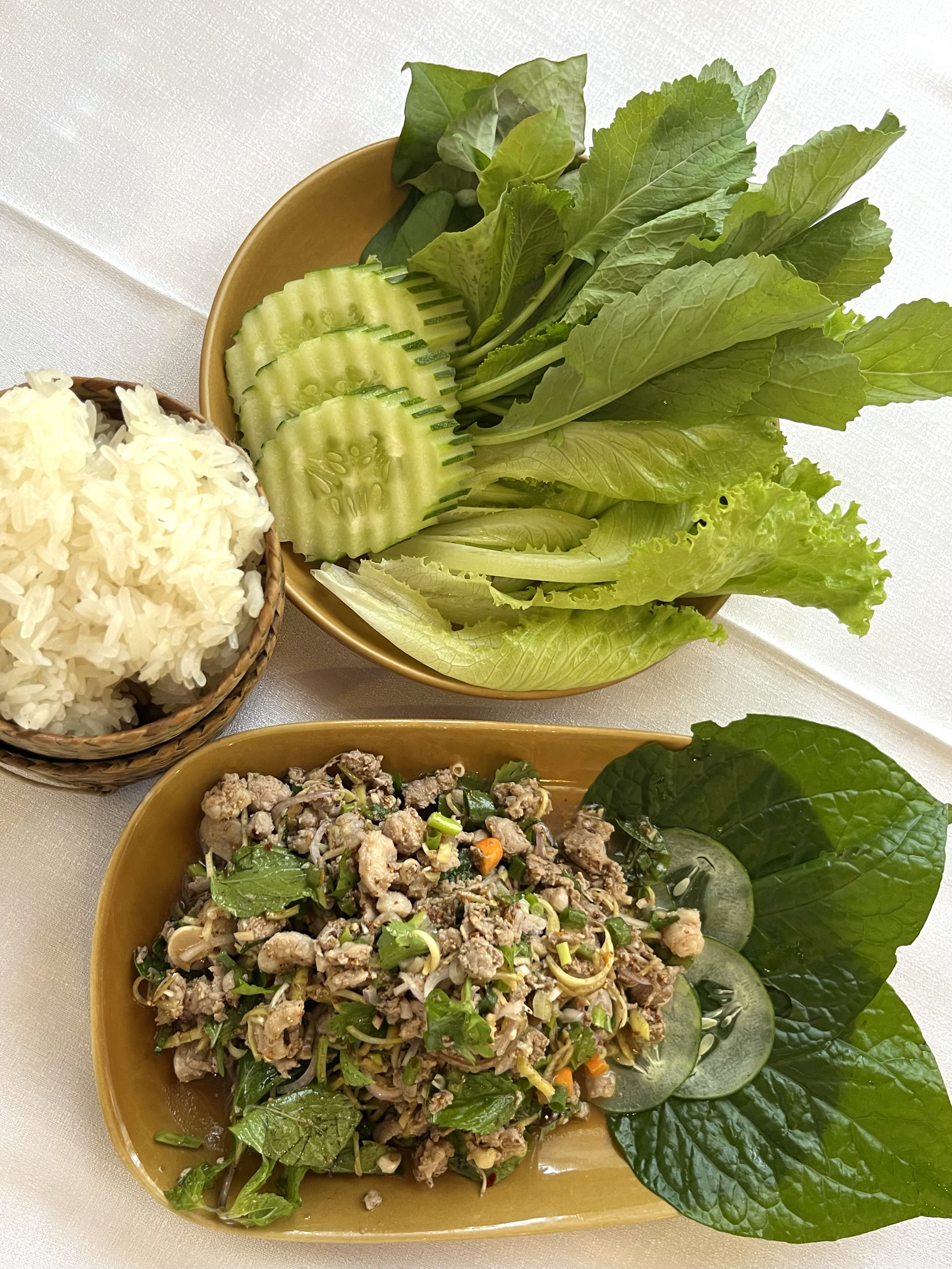
Lao Goi made with Mekong fish served with sticky rice and plenty of fresh vegetables

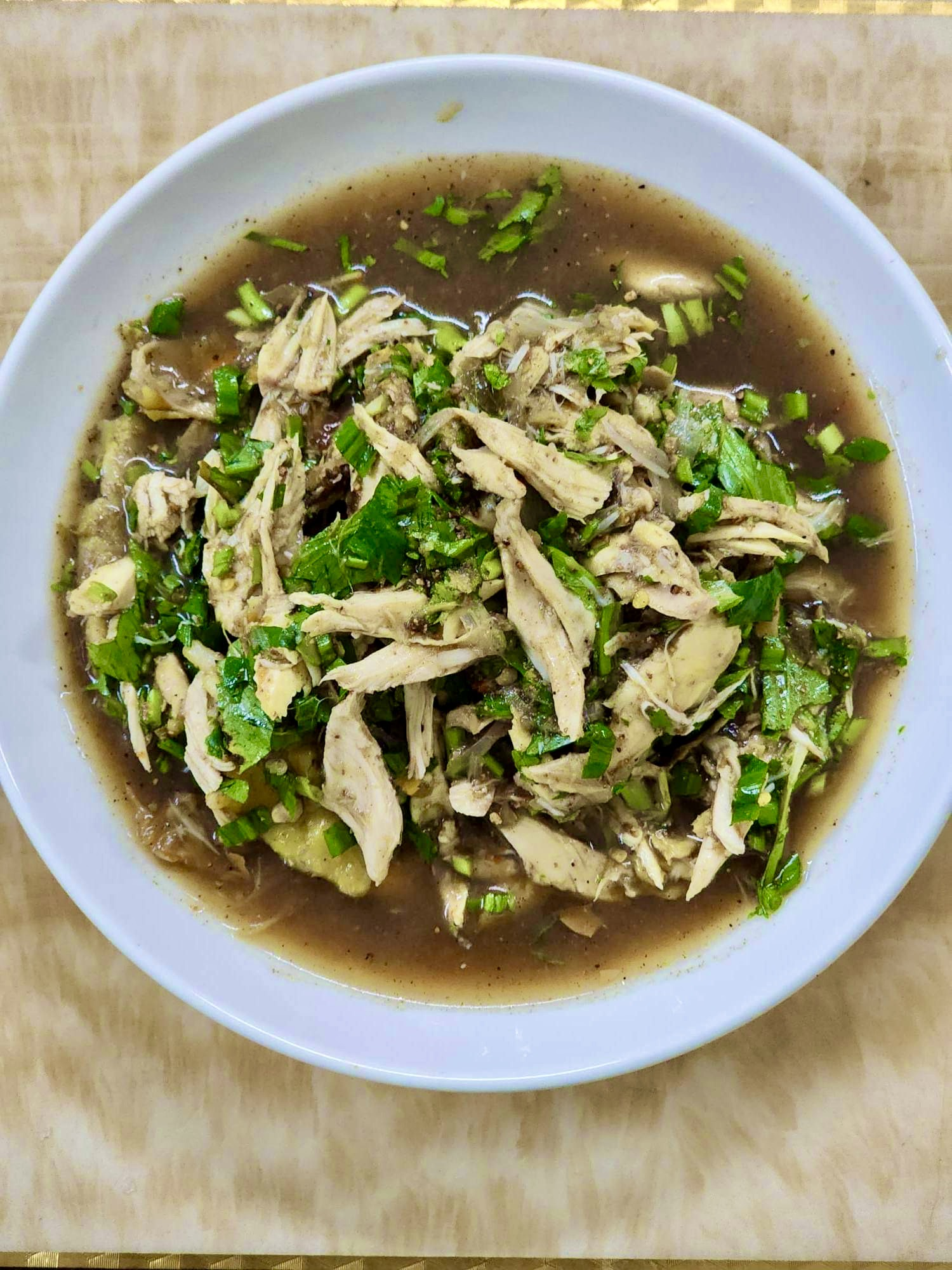
Lao Sua Gai is a variation of laab made with shredded cooked chicken meat.

=== Lao style ===
In Laos, depending on how the dish is prepared, it may be known by different names, including nam tok, goi/saa, yum/sua. Modern laab is most often made with chicken, beef, duck, fish, pork or mushrooms, flavored with fish sauce, lime juice, padaek, roasted ground rice and fresh herbs. The meat can be either raw or cooked; it is minced and mixed with chili, mint, roughly ground toasted rice (khao khua) and, optionally, assorted vegetables according to personal preference. The dish is served at room temperature and usually with a serving of sticky rice and raw or fresh vegetables. Traditionally, beef laab will only contain offal, bile, and all of the other ingredients without lime juice. Fish and shrimp laab are also traditionally absent lime juice but incorporate minced galangal. Compared to other laab, fish and shrimp laab does require an extra step. The deboned fish filet, or shrimp is minced, then pounded in a mortar and pestle until it turns to a gluey paste. Padaek juice is carefully added to the mixture, and stirred to a desired consistency, before finishing off with the finely chopped galangal and other aromatic herbs.

- Nam tok: Nam tok (Lao: ນ້ຳຕົກ, Thai: น้ำตก) is a Lao and Thai word meaning 'waterfall'. The name is derived either from the dripping of the meat juices during the grilling or from the juices running out of the medium rare beef as it is sliced. It refers to a popular Lao meat dish in both Laos and Isan, where it is commonly known as ping sin nam tok (Laos) or nuea yang nam tok (Thailand). This dish can be regarded as a variation on the standard laab, and is made from barbecued pork or beef, usually the neck, which is sliced in bite-size pieces. The meat is then brought to a boil with some stock to create sauce. The heat is turned off, and then sliced shallots, ground roasted rice, chili powder, lime juice, and fish sauce are added, along with shredded coriander leaves, spring onions and mint leaves.
- Goi/Saa: Goi (Lao: ກ້ອຍ), Saa (Lao: ສ້າ) is a laab-like dish with the meat sliced thinly, rather than minced. In Luang Prabang and northern Laos this method of preparation is referred to as saa, whereas in Vientiane and southern Laos it is known as goi. Raw goi or saa made with the freshest and highest quality fish is served to the most honored guests because it is the most delicate and complicated dish to prepare. A properly made goi or saa requires great knife skills and talent. The raw fish is filleted, deboned and sliced. The fish is then left to soak in a marinade consisting of saltwater brine and lime juice for 2 up to a maximum of 15 minutes depending on preference. This denaturing of the proteins "cooks" the fish much like the Latin American dish ceviche. Once marinated, the meat is squeezed until dry to remove the excess liquid. The left-over marinade from the fish is then combined with padaek and brought to a boil before being left to cool to form a sauce. When everything is ready, the fish is mixed with the sauce, roasted rice powder, pepper flakes, and finely chopped aromatic herbs, such as fennel, galangal, lemongrass, Laotian parsley, shallot, green onions, and mint. The mixture can further be seasoned with more salt or lime to taste. The final dish is a pale pink fish salad with green aromatics and always served with the soup stock of the fish bone, fresh vegetables and sticky rice. A similar dish exists in Vietnam known as bo tai chanh.
- Niao/Niaow: Another style, similar to method of making fish and shrimp laab, is a beef or water buffalo version called laab niaow (sticky laab), where a piece of raw lean meat is minced and then pounded together with fresh galangal, grilled garlic, shallots, dried chilli pepper, padaek liquid and beef broth into a thick paste or mixture. Finally, cooked and sliced liver, heart, spleen, rice powder (khao khoua), fried aromatics (chopped garlic, green onions, lemongrass), and fresh aromatics (chopped green onions and coriander) are stirred into the mixture and topped off as garnish before serving.
- Yum/Sua: Another style more ancient, which was popular amongst the aristocrats and served to Lao royalty is yum gai tom (boiled chicken) or sua gai (chicken). The recipes for the royal yum gai tom is found in Phia Sing's writing. Yum gai tom or sua gai is prepared by boiling a whole chicken with lemongrass, ginger, and kefir lime leaves. Once the chicken is cooked, the meat is removed from the carcass and chopped or shredded. Added to this are chopped cucumbers and tomatoes (optional), chili peppers, half-roasted shallots and garlic, and khao khua (toasted rice powder). Broth is added to moisten, along with lime juice, and fish sauce. Pepper and salt are added to taste. It is finished with spring onions on top and coriander to garnish.

=== Tai Nyuan/Lan Na style ===
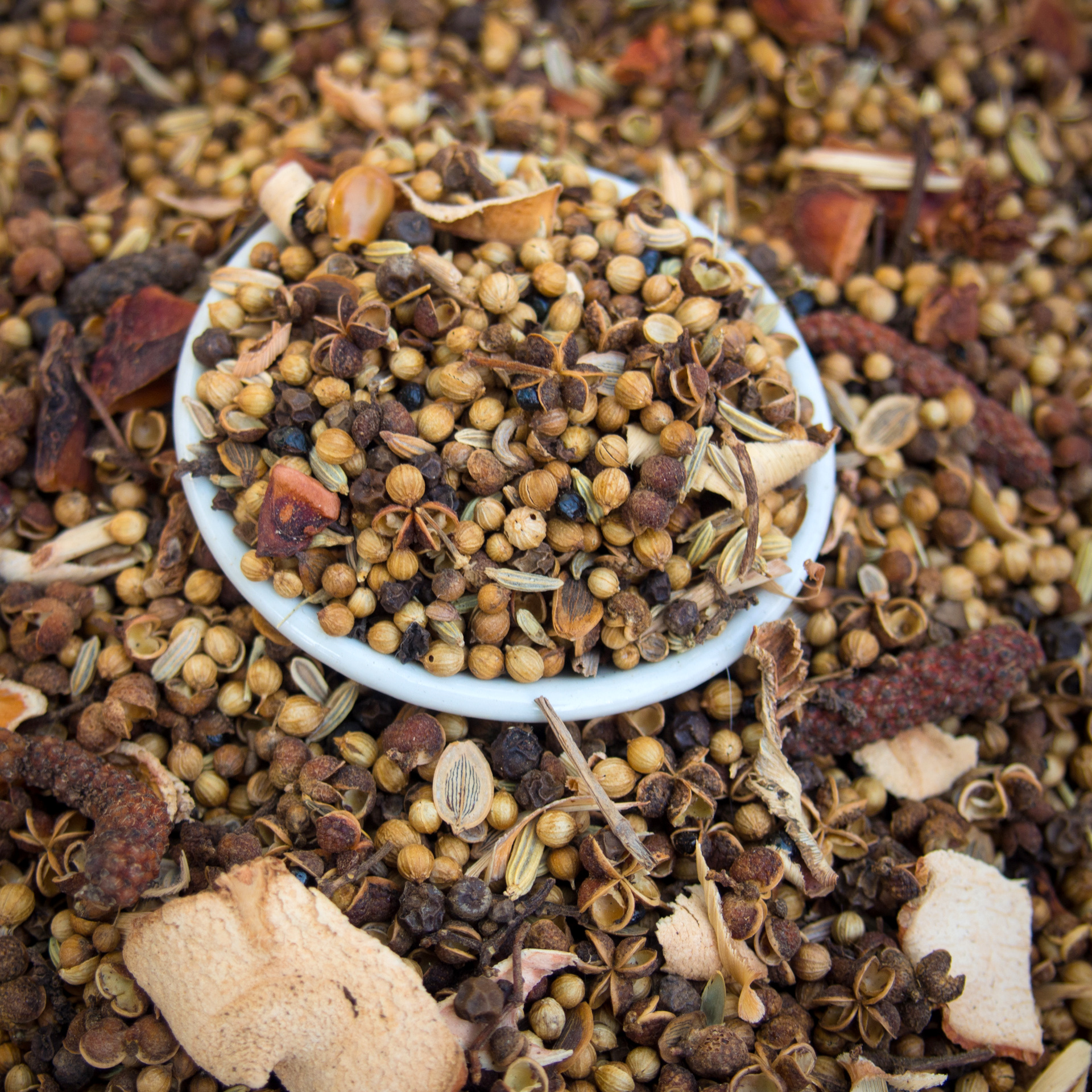
Phrik lap is the mix of dried spices used in northern Thai laab.

Laab in the old kingdom of Lanna (1292–1775), is a local delicacy popular to aristocrats in the area. The name derived from the full word of "จิ๊นลาบ", the word "จิ๊น" means animal meat while "ลาบ" means to chop into smaller pieces or mince in Lanna script (closely linked to Tai Tham).

Laab was enjoyed in both raw or cooked forms depends on the likings. The cooked laab is mostly roasted and, therefore, called "ลาบคั่ว" (roasted laab).

The raw laab are known as "ลาบเลือด" (blood laab), popularly eaten alongside alcohol. In the ancient times, it is made solely by men and women were banned from the process due to the notion that women could contaminate the dish with menstruated blood.

Lanna people often eat laab during auspicious celebrations such as the new year or Songkran, housewarming, weddings, ordination, and other Buddhist festivities. It is influenced by the Thai word "ลาภ" (derived from Pali) homophone: meaning unexpected luck or fortune.

The laab from northern Thailand, laab Lan Na, is different from the internationally more well-known Lao style laab. The northern Thai laab of the Tai Nyuan/Khon Muang (northern Thai people) does not contain fish sauce and is not sour, as neither lime juice nor any other souring agent is used. Instead, the northern Thai version uses a mix of dried spices as flavoring and seasoning which includes ingredients such as cumin, cloves, long pepper, star anise, prickly ash seeds and cinnamon amongst others, derived from the location of northern Thailand's Lan Na Kingdom on one of the spice routes to China, in addition to ground dried chillies, and, in the case of laab made with pork or chicken, the blood of the animal. The dish can be eaten raw (laab dip), but also after it has been stir-fried for a short time (laab suk). If blood is omitted from the preparation of the stir-fried version, the dish is called laab khua (Thai: ลาบคั่ว). There is also a kind of laab called laab luat (Lao: ລາບເລືອດ) or lu (Thai: หลู้). This dish is made with minced raw pork or beef, raw blood, kidney, fat and bile, and mixed with spices, crispy fried onions, fresh herbs and other ingredients. Laab and its other variations are served with an assortment of fresh vegetables and herbs, and eaten with glutinous rice. This version of laab is thought to have originated in the town of Phrae, in northern Thailand. This style of laab can also be found in parts of northern Laos.

== Health risks of consuming raw ==
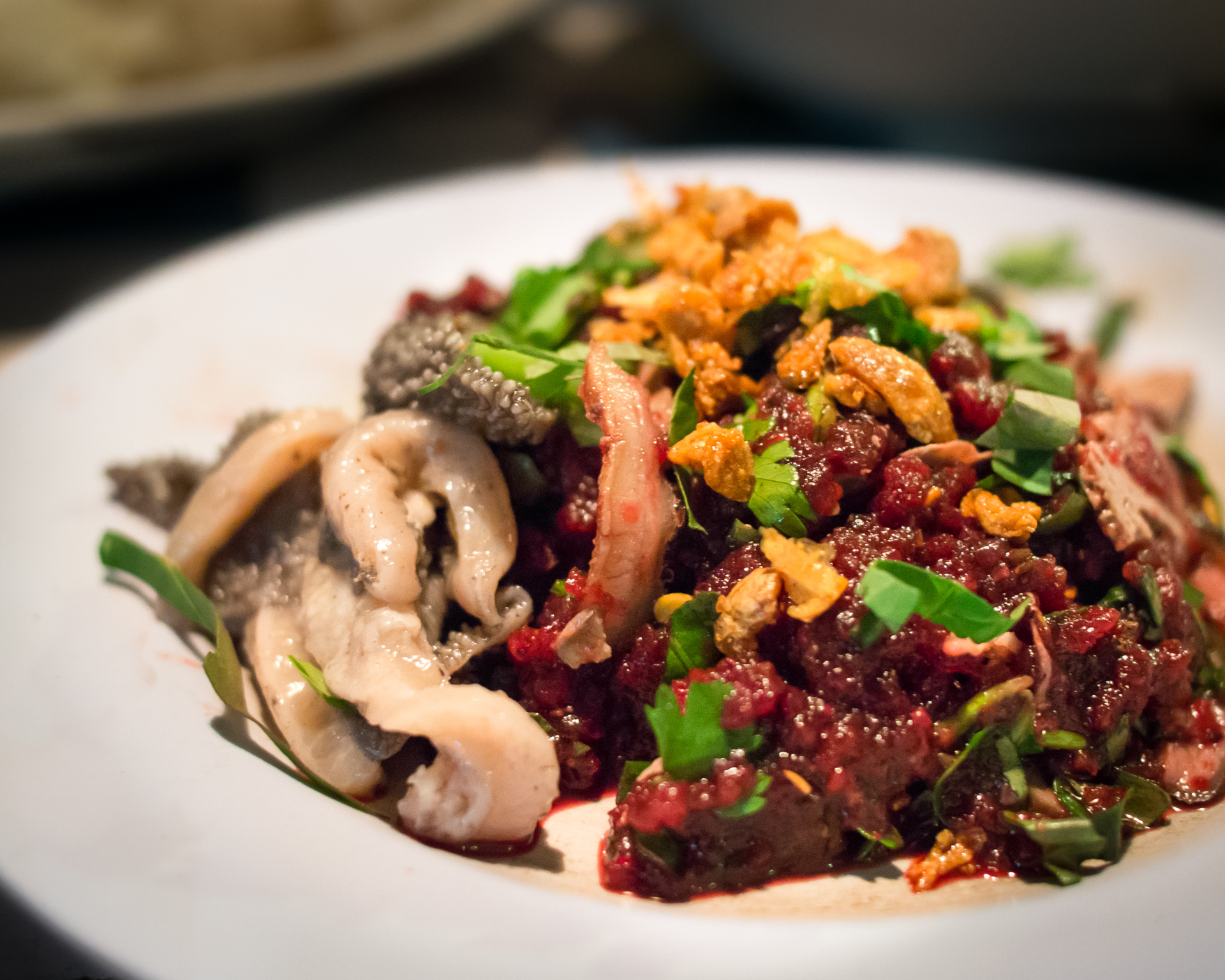
Raw beef laab, Chiang Mai

The risks from eating raw meat include contracting trichinosis, caused by an infectious worm, along with fatal bacterial or potentially rabies infection. The consumption of raw laab and lu made with raw pork has led to several cases of human Streptococcus suis infections in Thailand, some of them with a deadly result.

The consumption of raw freshwater fish can lead to an infection by Opisthorchis viverrini (Southeast Asian liver fluke), a parasitic flatworm that can live for many years inside the human liver. Northern Thailand, where certain fishes are consumed fermented, has the highest recorded rate of medically untreatable cholangiocarcinoma.

== See also ==
- Cuisine of Laos
- Koi (dish)
- Gỏi – Vietnamese salad
- List of meat dishes
- List of salads
- Thai salads
