= Nam tok (food) =

Southeast Asian soup or meat salad

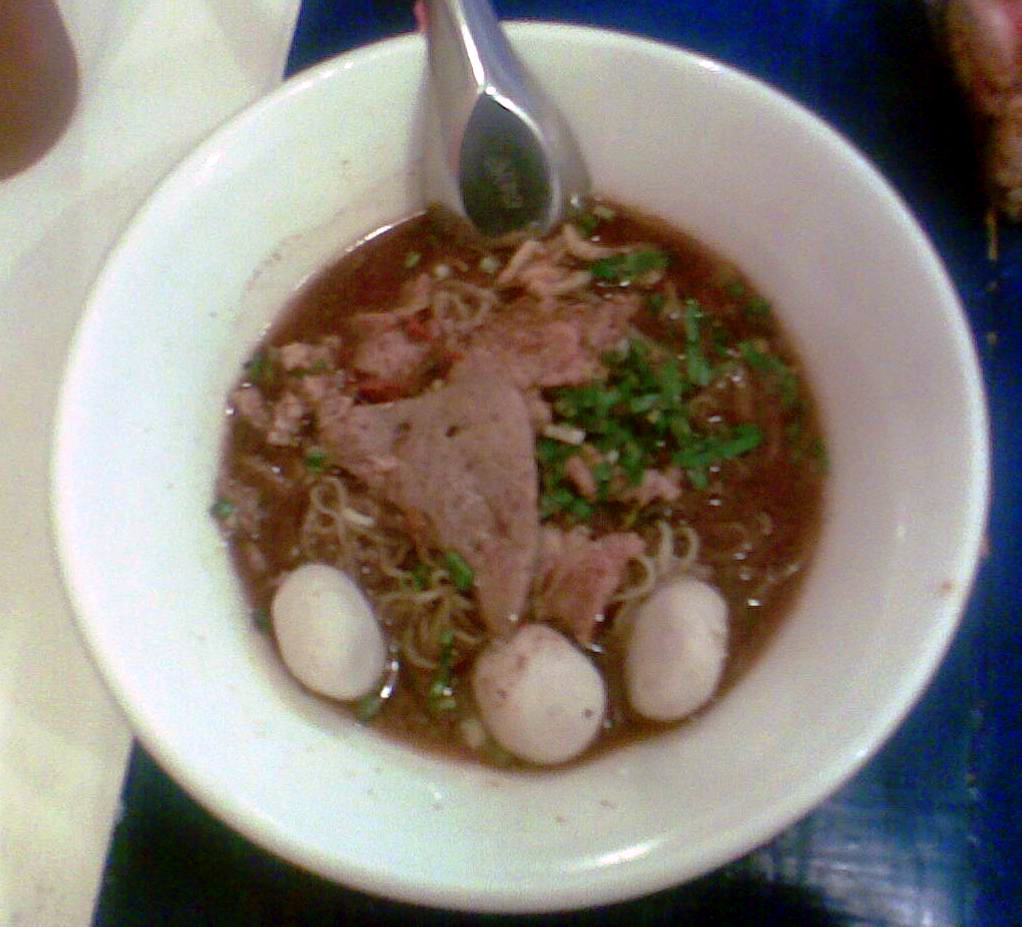
- kuai-tiao nam tok, noodle soup darkened with raw blood in Bangkok
- Place of origin: Laos, Isan
- Main ingredients: stock, blood

Nam tok (Lao: ນ້ຳຕົກ, pronounced [nâm tók]; Thai: น้ำตก, RTGS: nam tok, pronounced [nám tòk]; Northeastern Thai: น้ำตก, pronounced [nȁm tǒk]) is either a soup or a meat salad from Southeast Asia. In the Lao and Thai language, the phrase means waterfall. The meat salad in Lao cuisine is a sliced beef steak instead of minced meat version of larb, Laos' national dish.

Nam tok can refer to two different kinds of preparation:

- In Central Thailand, nam tok is mainly a spicy soup stock enriched with raw cow blood or pig's blood. Blood is often used in Thailand to enrich regular noodle dishes. One of the most popular variants of the nam tok noodle soup is known as kuai-tiao mu nam tok. It includes broth, blood, noodles, bean sprouts, pieces of liver, pork, dumplings, green vegetables and spices. This type of soup has an intense, rich and pleasant taste and is often served by streetside vendors in small food stalls.
- Nam tok can be also an Isan and Lao meat dish which is similar to lap (larb). This dish is known in Lao as ping sin nam tok (Lao: ປິ້ງຊິ້ນນ້ຳຕົກ) and in Thai as nuea yang nam tok (Thai: เนื้อย่างน้ำตก, "waterfall grilled beef"), if made with beef, and as mu nam tok (Thai: หมูน้ำตก, "waterfall pork"), if made with pork. The name supposedly refers to the fact that there is still "water", or liquid, in the meat, that is, blood. The "dressing" of this meat-based salad is made with ground roasted rice, ground dried chillies, fish sauce, lime juice, shallots and mint leaves. It can also feature spring onions. It is traditionally eaten with sticky rice and comes with raw vegetables such as thua fak yao (Thai: ถั่วฝักยาว, yardlong beans) and kalam pli (Thai: กะหล่ำปลี, cabbage).

== Gallery ==
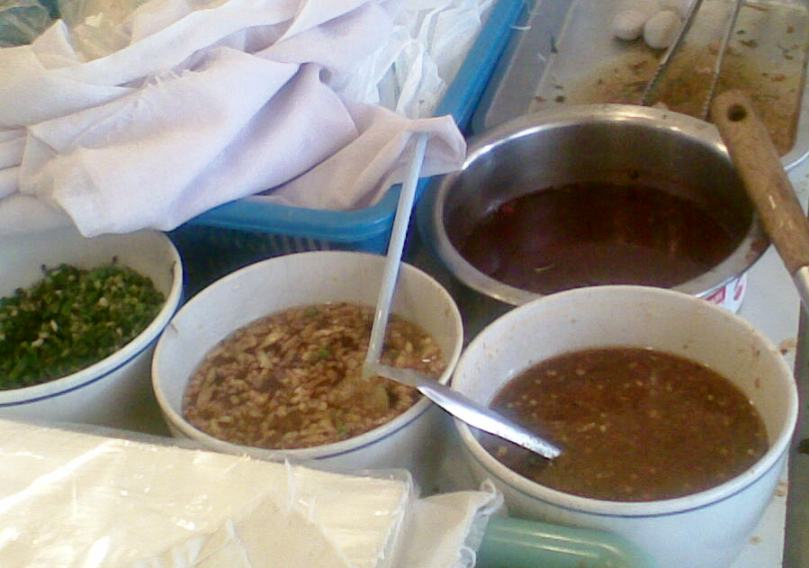
Nam tok-noodle ingredients in Thailand. The upper right pot has raw pig's blood that will be added to the noodle soup preparations

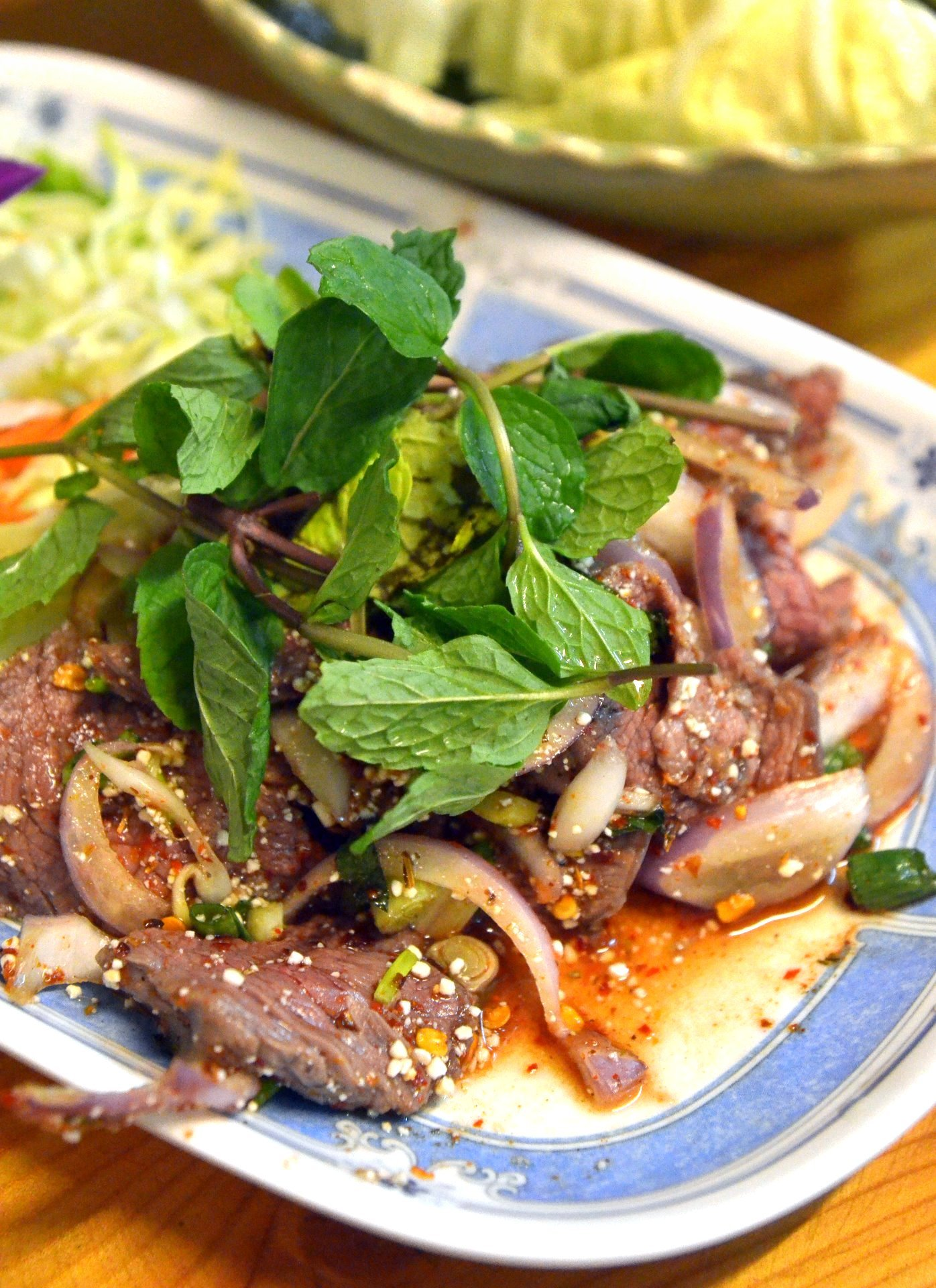
Nuea yang nam tok, sliced grilled beef in a spicy "dressing" with shallots and mint

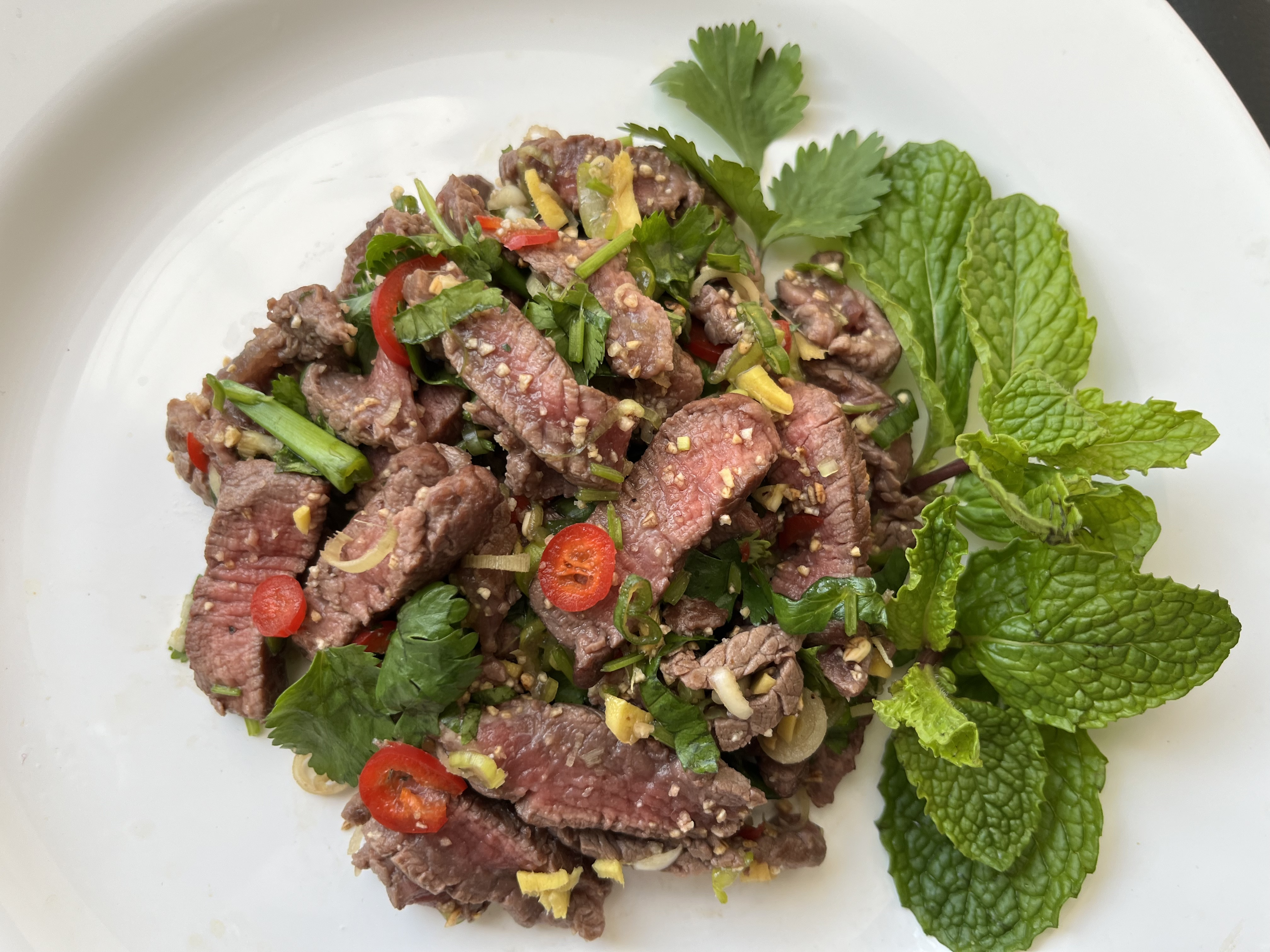
Lao ping sin nam tok is made with sliced beef steak with a variety of herbs and spices

== See also ==
- Larb
- Lao cuisine
- Thai cuisine
- Thai salads
