= Thai salads =

Thai cuisine

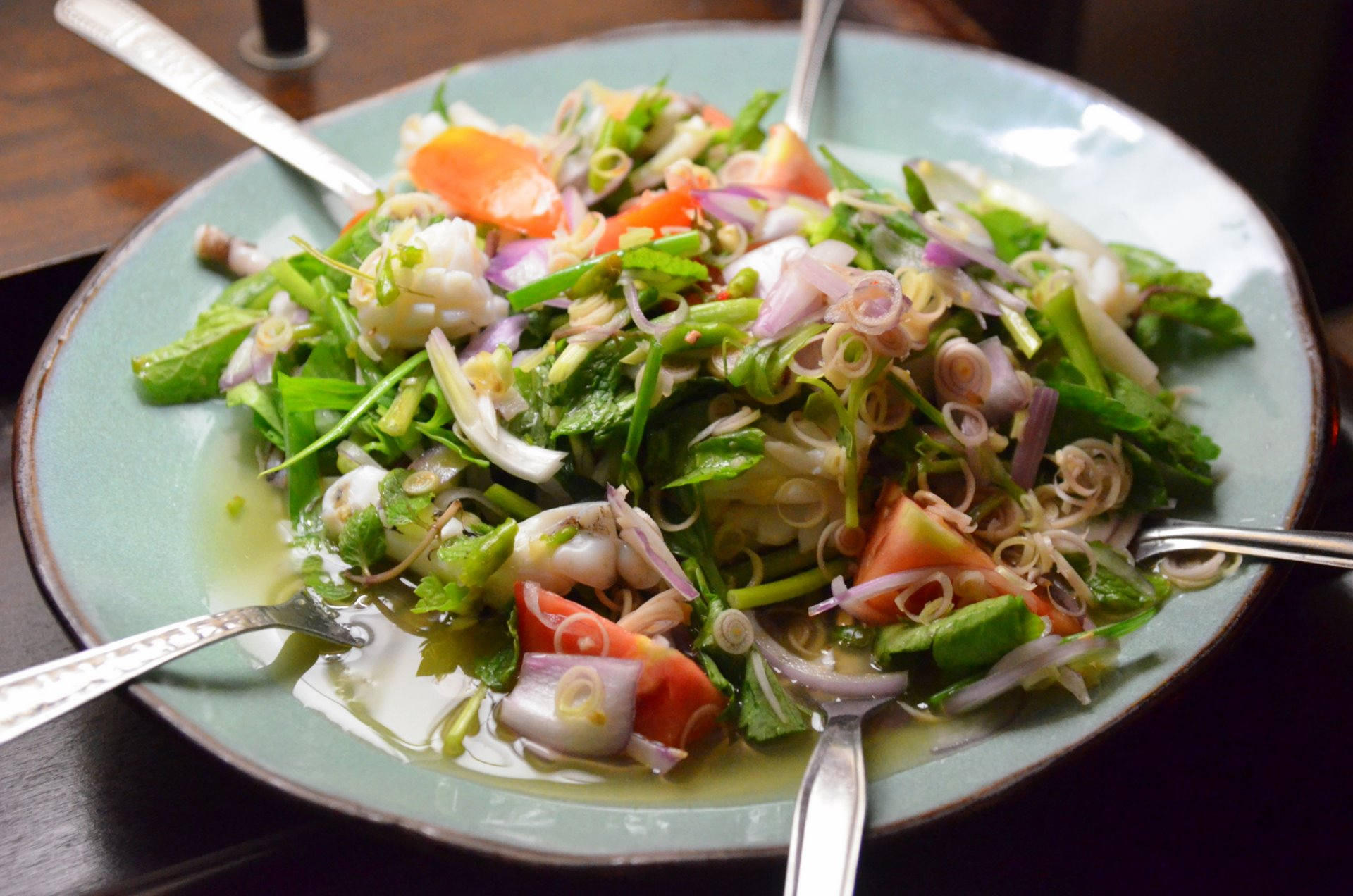
- Yam thale, Thai mixed seafood salad
- Type: Salad
- Place of origin: Thailand
- Main ingredients: Various
- Variations: Yam, tam, lap, phla
- Similar dishes: Burmese salads, Vietnamese salads

Salads that are internationally known as Thai salads with a few exceptions fall into four main preparation methods. In Thai cuisine these are called yam, tam, lap and phla. A few other dishes can also be regarded as being a salad.

== Overview ==
Thai salads often do not have raw vegetables or fruit as their main ingredient but use minced meat, seafood, or noodles instead. Similar to salads in the West, these dishes often have a souring agent, usually lime juice, and feature the addition of fresh herbs and other greens in their preparation. Thai salads are not served as entrées but are normally eaten as one of the main dishes in a Thai buffet-style meal, together with rice (depending on the region, this can be glutinous rice or non-glutinous rice) or the Thai rice noodle called khanom chin. Specialised khao tom kui (plain rice congee) restaurants also serve a wide variety of Thai salads of the yam type as side dishes. Many Thai salads, for instance, the famous som tam, are also eaten as a meal or snack on their own.

== Varieties ==
=== Yam ===
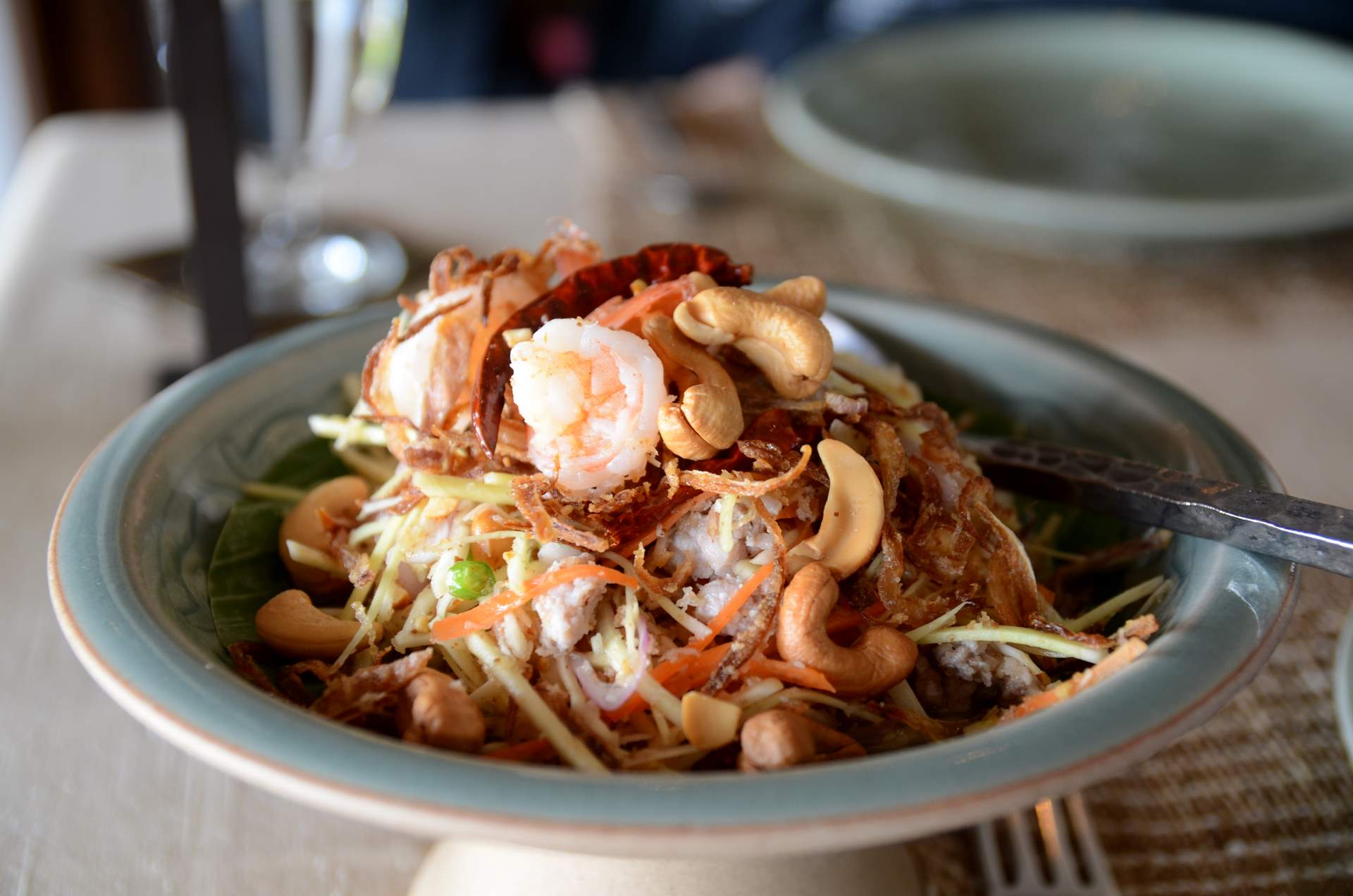
Yam khamin khao kung

Yam (ยำ, Thai pronunciation: [jām]) literally means "mix," but in Thai cuisine, it usually refers to a type of salad-like dishes in the culinary repertoire of Thailand. Yam can be made with a wide variety of ingredients as its main ingredient. Nearly any type of protein, vegetable, fruit, herb, spice, and noodle, or combinations thereof, is possible. The main ingredient can be raw, pickled, fermented, sun-dried, smoked, steamed, parboiled, boiled, grilled, baked, stir-fried, deep-fried, or combinations. Besides the main ingredient, the basic recipe of a yam will nearly always contain sliced fresh shallots or onions, fish sauce, lime juice, sugar, and fresh or dried chillies. When herbs are used, it is usually Chinese celery, sometimes in combination with other fresh herbs such as spearmint, coriander leaves, spring onions and culantro. Very often, sliced tomatoes are also added in, or finely sliced fresh spices such as lemongrass, ginger, galangal, or khamin khao (lit. 'white turmeric').

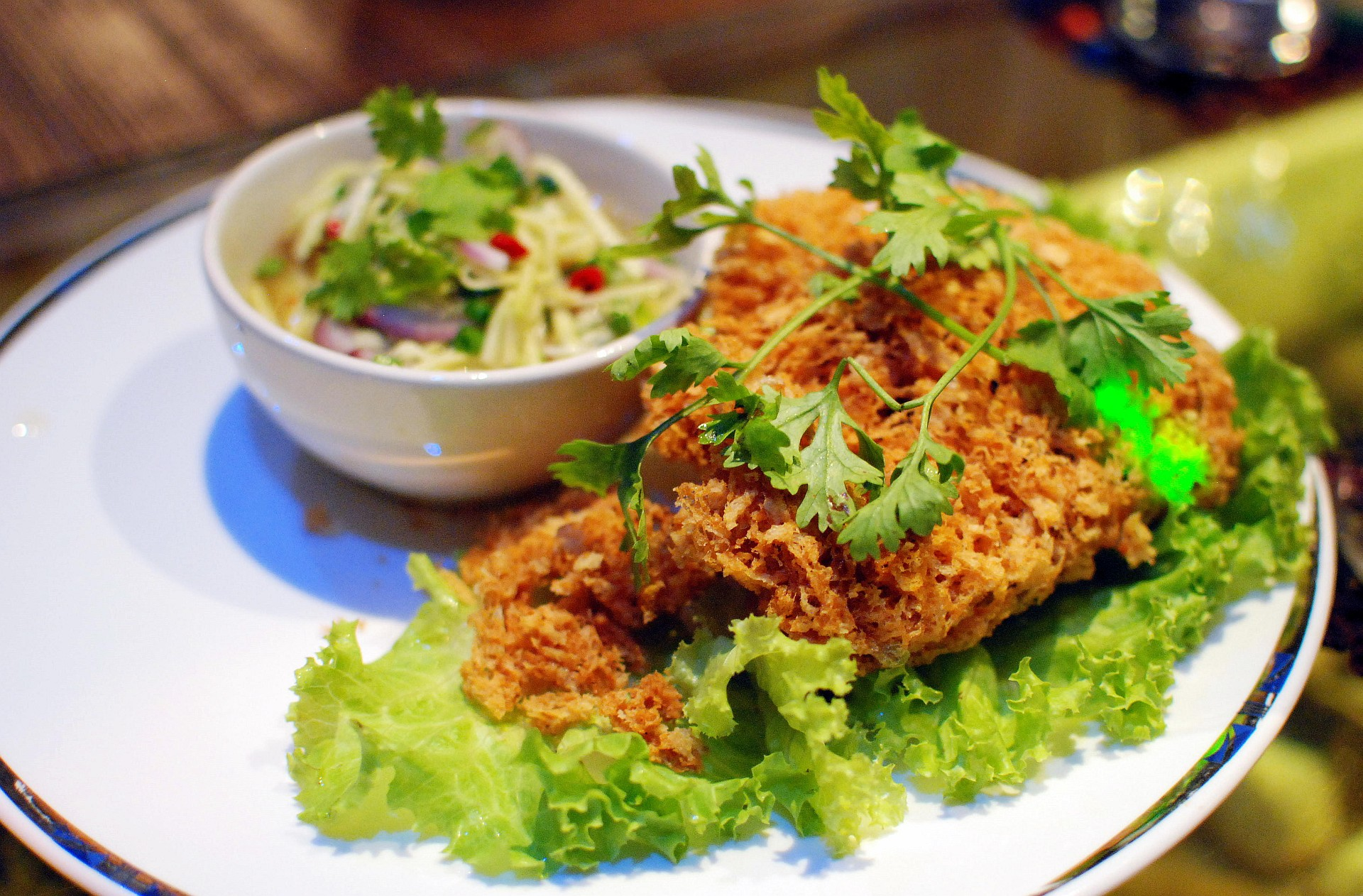
Yam pla duk fu, with the green mango dressing in a bowl on the side

Examples of yam style salads are yam nuea yang with sliced grilled beef, yam khai dao with fried egg, yam tale with mixed seafood, yam mu yo with a pork sausage resembling liverwurst, or yam wunsen with glass noodles. Some yam salads can use only herbs, spices, and nuts as their main ingredient, such as yam takhrai met mamuang himaphan with sliced lemongrass and cashew nuts, or with stir-fried vegetables, such as water mimosa in yam phak krachet. Depending on the salad, anything from crispy fried onions, crunchy nuts, or seeds to toasted coconut flakes can also be added to the mix to enhance the flavours, colours and textures. Also, in many yam salads where the main ingredient is not meat, cooked minced pork can be added for extra savoryness, as often happens in yam wunsen (glass noodle salad). After one look at the menu of a khao tom kui (plain rice congee) restaurant, it is clear that nearly any ingredient that one can imagine can be used to make a yam-style salad. To name a few: yam khai khem (salted duck eggs), yam kung chiang (dry Chinese sweet pork sausage), yam mu krop (Chinese crispy pork), and yam phak kat dong (Chinese pickled cabbage). These yam that are eaten with plain rice congee tend to remain more simple in their preparation, containing only the basic "dressing" of lime juice, raw onion or shallot, chillies, sugar, and fish sauce in addition to the main ingredient, with only some celery added where needed.

A few types of yam need special mention as they differ somewhat from the basic recipe as mentioned above:

- Yam naem khao thot (also known as naem khluk) is a salad made from crushed, deep-fried ball-shaped croquettes made from sticky rice and curry paste as the main ingredient, tossed together with shredded fermented pork sausage, mixed with peanuts, crushed dried chilies, lime juice, sliced shallots, and fresh herbs, and served with a selection of fresh greens and additional herbs on the side.
- Yam thawai is an elaborate salad made with chicken and a wide selection of vegetables, such as banana flowers, eggplant, string beans, bamboo shoots, and bean sprouts, blanched briefly in coconut milk, and then served together with a creamy curry-like dressing.
- Yam pla duk fu or pla duk fu yam mamuang is deep-fried flaked catfish meat served with a dressing made with thinly sliced unripe mango, shallots, chillies, lime juice, sugar and fish sauce.
- Yam kung ten or just kung ten is a salad made with tiny translucent freshwater shrimp. The novelty of this dish is that a spicy lime dressing is first placed at the bottom of a bowl, which is then filled to the brim with the live shrimp and closed off with a lid when the lid is opened by an unsuspecting dinner guest, some of the small wriggling shrimp jump out of the bowl. Kung ten literally means "dancing shrimp". Shaking the bowl mixes the live shrimp with the sour dressing, which kills them.
- Northern Thai yam do not follow the usual Thai yam dressing in that they tend not to be sour. Many are soup-like in appearance and resemble cold vegetable, meat, or fish stews. They are made similarly to a salad, combining the separate (cold) ingredients into one dish with fresh herbs. A sauce made from boiled, fermented fish is often used as a flavouring.
- Yam som o, a yam made with pomelo, can utilise a different dressing altogether than a standard yam. As the pomelo, a citrus fruit is already naturally tart, the dressing can be sweet or creamy. It is, therefore, that recipes often make use of palm sugar, tamarind, and coconut milk to complement the taste of the pomelo.
- Yam salat is commonly used to denote Western salads in Thai, usually to refer to salads that use mayonnaise in the dressing.
- Yam maeng da is made from grilled horseshoe crab and only the eggs are eaten. It has a nutty and strong fishy taste.

=== Tam ===
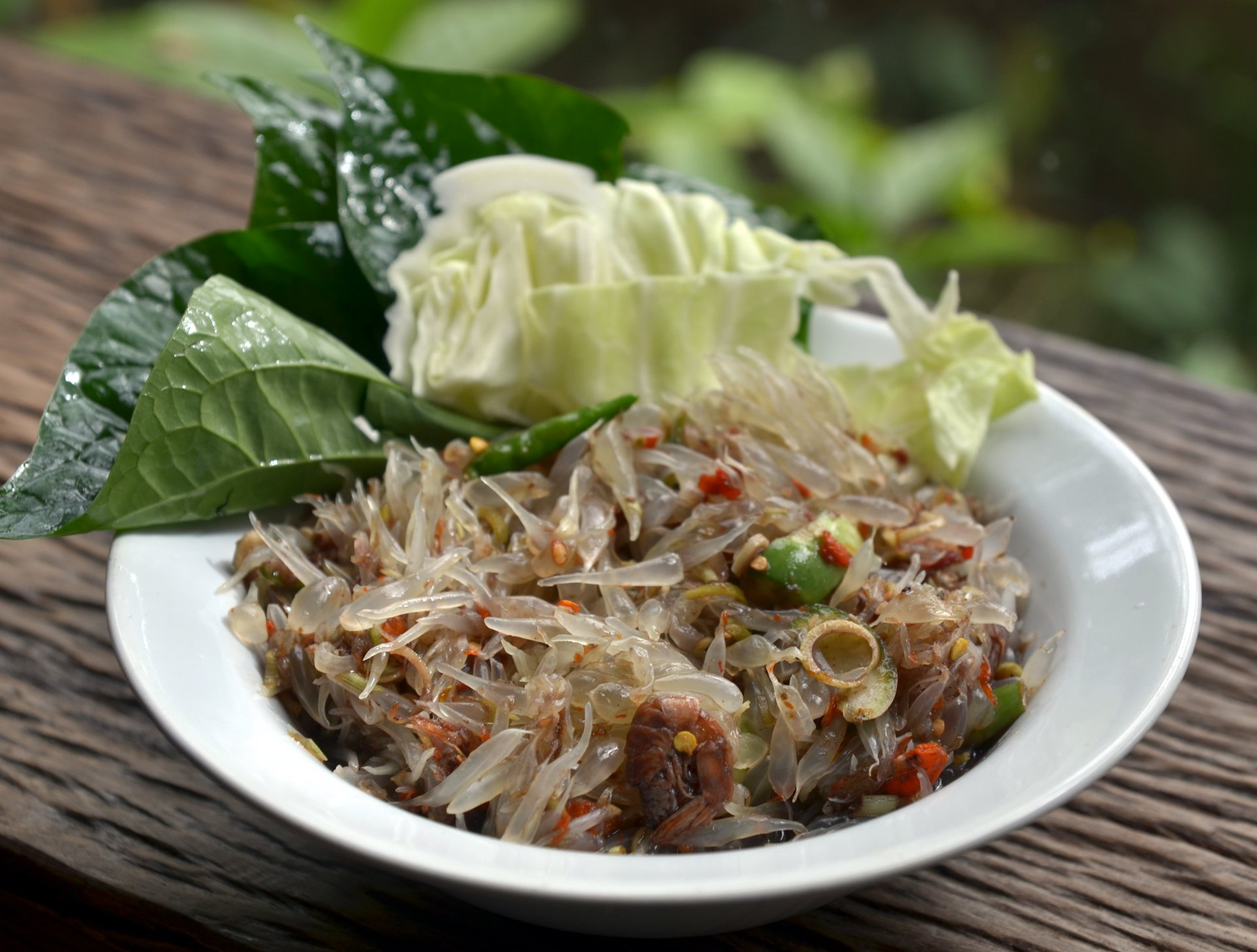
Northern Thai tam som o

The most famous, and for many also the original, tam (ตำ, pronounced [tām]), lit. "pounded") style salad is som tam, made from unripe papaya. The basic dressing for a som tam-style salad contains garlic, palm sugar, lime juice, bird's-eye chillies, dried shrimp and fish sauce. This dressing is slightly pounded and mixed inside an earthenware mortar using a wooden pestle. With certain kinds of tam, some or all of the additional ingredients will be pounded slightly if this helps release the flavours. Though with dishes such as tam phonla mai (fruit) or tam mu yo (a sausage similar to liverwurst), the main ingredients are mixed in with the dressing. Many types of tam salads will also contain (sliced) tomatoes.

Northern Thai tam are quite different altogether. Most of these dishes do not use lime, tamarind juice, or vinegar in their dressing, thereby lacking the sour element seen in many salads. Tam makhuea is made from mashed grilled eggplant, grilled shallots and garlic, roasted chillies, fish, and shrimp paste and served with mint and boiled egg. It is somewhat similar to other eggplant salads from around the world, such as baba ghanoush. Further removed from what would still be viewed as a salad in the West is the northern Thai tam khanun, made with a mashed boiled whole baby jackfruit, dried chillies, minced pork stir-fried with a chilli paste, cherry tomatoes, fresh kaffir lime leaves, and coriander leaves. Another traditional salad from northern Thailand is tam khai mot daeng, made with the eggs of the red ant. Phak phai (Vietnamese mint) is one of the more unusual herbs used in this salad. A tam style salad from northern Thailand that is also famous in the rest of Thailand, is tam som-o (pomelo salad), in which the slightly pounded flesh of a pomelo is mixed with garlic, sliced lemongrass, and a thick pungent black paste (nam pu) made from boiling down the juices and meat of rice-paddy crabs.

=== Lap ===
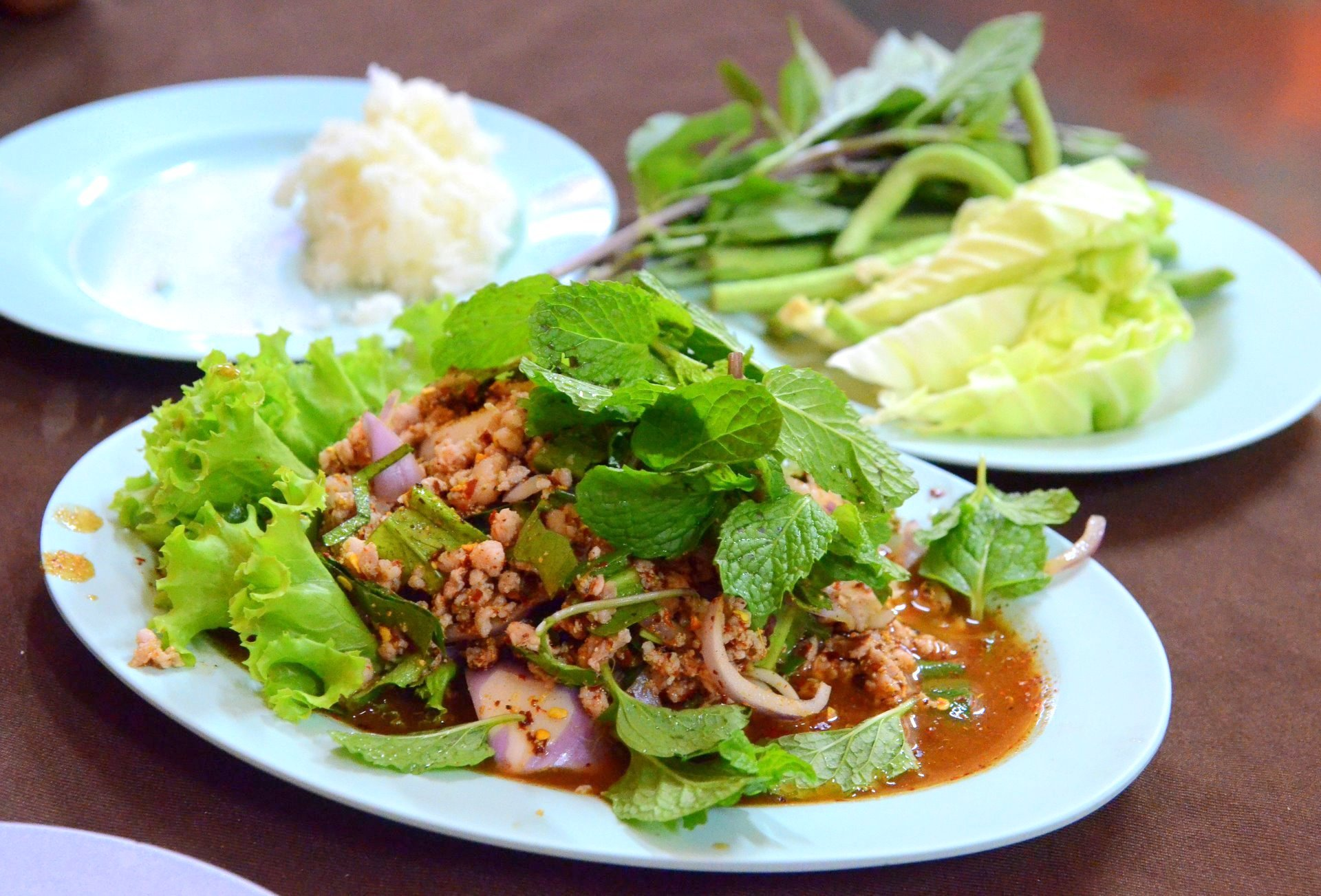
Lap mu Isan

Lap or larb (ลาบ, pronounced [lâːp]) is one of the internationally most well-known salads from Laos. The spicy, sweet, and very tart style of lap from Laos and northeastern Thailand is made with a dressing of lime juice, fish sauce, ground dried chillies, sugar, and, very importantly, khao khua, ground dry roasted glutinous rice which gives this salad its specific nutty flavour. Coriander leaves and chopped spring onions finish off the dish. Lap is most commonly made with minced pork or minced chicken, but in Thailand, lap pla, with fish, is also popular. Nam tok is a derivative of lap where the meat is sliced and not minced.

Northern Thai lap is a very different type of dish. As with the northern Thai tam, no souring agent is used in these dishes. Especially the versions using stir-fried minced meat (lap khua) more resemble a "normal" meat dish than a salad; but, as with salads, different ingredients, including fresh herbs and spices, are freshly mixed to form the dish. Other versions of this northern Thai speciality use raw meat or fish.

=== Phla ===
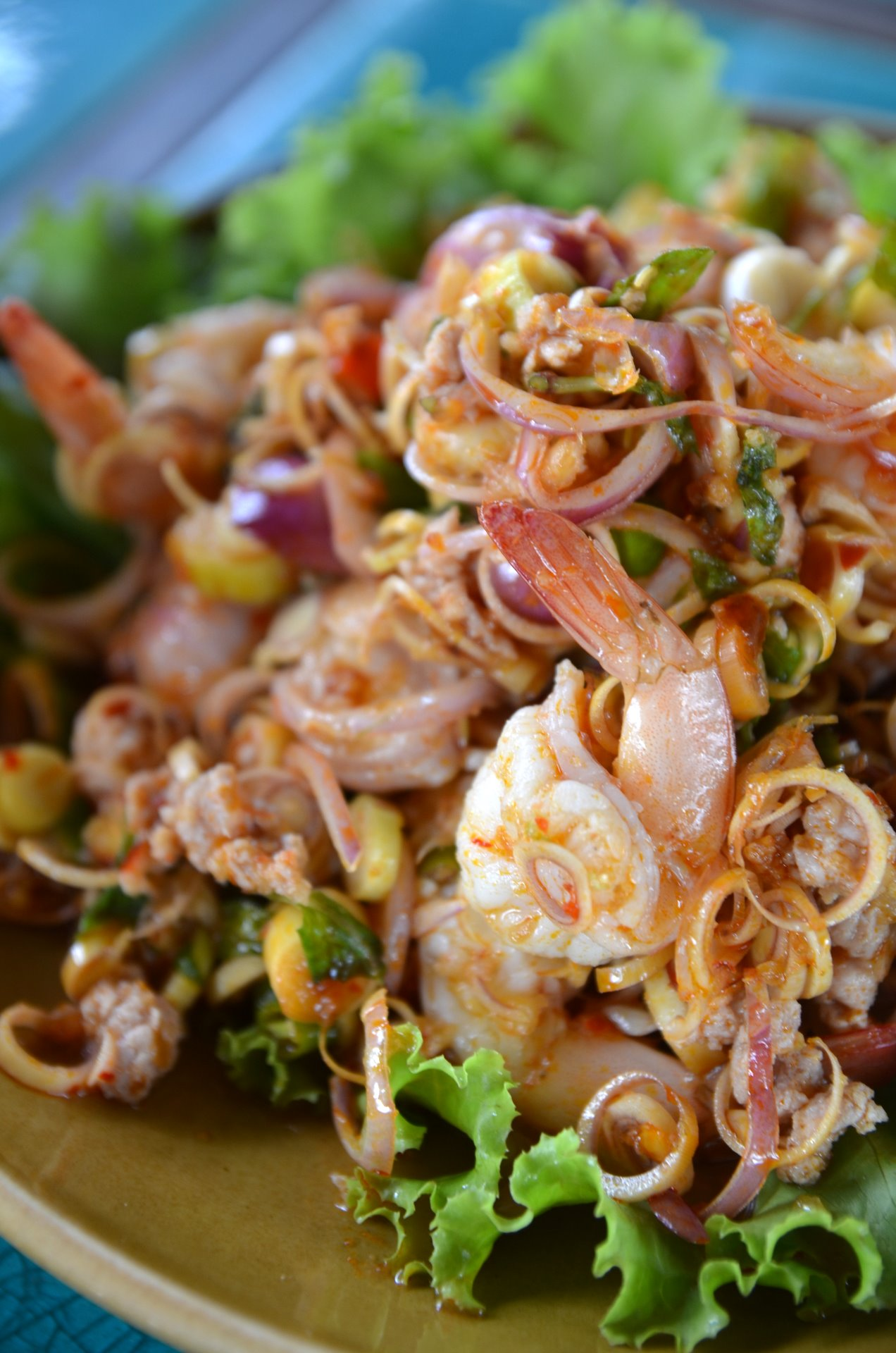
Phla kung

Phla (พล่า, pronounced [pʰlâː]) style salads can be made with a variety of proteins but not thoroughly cooked (rare to medium). Popularly used are pork (phla mu), prawns (phla kung) or beef (phla nuea). The basic dressing is very much the same as a yam but with a difference. In addition to the fish sauce, lime juice, chillies, and shallots or onions, a phla style salad will also always contain large amounts of thinly sliced lemongrass and mint. Additional fresh herbs, such as coriander leaves, can also be added to the mix. Some versions are made with grilled pork or beef, other versions will also have nam phrik phao, a sweet roasted chilli paste mixed in with the dressing. This last version is popular with squid (phla pla muek) and with prawns.

=== Others ===
The following dishes can also be regarded as salads:

- Khanom chin sao nam is a kind of noodle salad using fresh Thai rice noodles called khanom chin, mixed in with thick coconut milk, chopped pineapple, garlic, bird's-eye chillies, ginger "au julienne", lime juice, fish sauce, and pounded dried shrimp.
- Mu kham wan or mu manao is a salad-like dish of sliced grilled pork over which a spicy and very sweet dressing made with lime juice, garlic, bird's-eye chillies, sugar and fish sauce is poured. This dressing is a generic Thai nam chim (lit. 'dipping sauce'). It is often served sprinkled with mint leaves and served together with thinly sliced raw Chinese broccoli, which are made extra crispy by serving the sliced vegetable on a bed of ice.
- Sa are salad-like dishes from northern Thailand which can use a similar chilli and spice paste as the northern Thai lap, but with sliced raw shallots and garlic added into the dish. Two of the numerous variations are sa phli, which is made with uncooked sliced banana flowers, and sa chin, with sliced raw buffalo meat. Sa taengkwa, made with cucumber, doesn't use the lap spice mix but instead a mix of shrimp paste, roasted, fermented soybean, and boiled fermented fish.
- Achat is the Thai version of the Malay and Indonesian pickle called acar. Where the original acar can be made with a whole range of vegetables, the Thai versions are limited to cucumber. Achat is often served in a small dish as a dipping sauce for sate, thot man pla (spicy Thai fish cakes), and popia thot (deep-fried spring rolls). Taengkwa priao wan is a similar salad-like cucumber pickle.
- Sup no mai (lit. 'bamboo-shoot salad!--ซุบ is an Isan word for a kind of spicy salad--') is a salad made by first boiling bamboo shoots, ya nang leaf juice and other ingredients together, after which the resulting salad is mixed with fresh herbs, sliced onions, and dried chillies.
- Khao yam pak tai (ข้าวยำปักษ์ใต้, lit. "southern Thai mixed rice") is one of the staples of southern Thailand. It comes in many versions but the basic recipe for the most widespread variation involves mixing cold cooked rice with pieces or slices of unripe mango or pomelo, dried shrimp, budu sauce, bean sprouts, toasted coconut flakes, sliced lemongrass and kaffir lime leaves. Sometimes lime juice is added for additional tartness.
- Miang kham are small "salad" parcels made with the fresh peppery leaf of the chaphlu wrapped around a filling of toasted coconut, chopped lime, bird's-eye chillies, shallots, and ginger, which has been topped with a sweet and savoury sauce made from palm sugar and fish sauce. Variations include additional ingredients for the filling, such as dried shrimp, roasted peanuts, fried fish or meat, sliced lemongrass, and alternative ingredients for the sauce, such as tamarind, shrimp paste and galangal. These bite-sized parcels are often eaten as a snack or appetiser.
- Nam tok mu is made with grilled pork, chilli powder, chopped shallots, ground roasted rice and lime juice.

Although not a salad as it doesn't involve mixing ingredients into a specific dish, the Thai tradition of serving a selection of fresh and boiled greens (often vegetables but also raw tree leaves, steamed mushrooms, or cooked pumpkin) together with a saucer or bowl of nam phrik (Thai chilli paste), fits one of the typical characteristics of a salad, being cold vegetables with a "sauce" as an accompaniment to a meal.

== See also ==
- List of Thai dishes
- List of Thai ingredients
- List of salads
