= Gerrit van Wuysthoff =

Dutch merchant

Gerrit van Wuysthoff (also Geraerd Wuesthoff; lived in the 17th century) was a Dutch merchant and served the Dutch East India Company. According to sources, he was the first European to visit what is now Laos, one year before Jesuit missionary Giovanni Maria Leria.

== Biography: the first Westerner in Laos ==
In 1641, Wuysthoff undertook an exploration trip from the then capital of Cambodia, Longvek, to Vientiane in northern Laos on behalf of the Cambodian trading post of the East India Company. His companions were a barber who also worked as a field clerk, an interpreter, two porters and a group of Laotian merchants. The journey began during the rainy monsoon season on 20 July 1641, with a collection of goods and gifts to the King of Lan Xang, Sourigna Vongsa, who resided in Vientiane. A total of 30 people went up the Mekong in 12 boats.

Wuysthoff's trip was determined by two reasons: first the Dutch East India Company wanted to find out how profitable the trade with Lan Xang could be and second, they wanted to find out to what extent the Mekong was suitable as a trade route into the inland of Southeast Asia. The Dutch were interested in rubber lacquer for the production of sealing wax, benzoin for the production of incense, and animal skins.

Wuysthoff was surprised by the Laotian monk's sexual indulgence, and their refusal to beg alms which set them apart from the orthodox sanghas, suggesting a still very limited Buddhist textuality among the Lao aristocrats, not to mention the commoners. The exploration had contact with Laotian merchants in Ayutthaya and Cambodia, but the company wanted to eliminate competition from Arabia and India by trading directly with Lan Xang. Therefore, Wuysthoff should convince the Laotian king to trade with the company and to grant it a monopoly on certain goods.

Wuysthoff was received with great honors, and relations with the Dutch East India Company became very profitable. He was not however able to set up a trading post in Vientiane, the journeys were simply too long and inconvenient. The boats had to be unloaded and carried at the numerous waterfalls.

== Posterity: the travel guide to Laos ==
Van Wuysthoff wrote a travel diary published in 1669 that was translated into French and used as a travel guide for centuries.

== Bibliography ==
- Jean-Claude Lejosne: Le journal de voyage de Gerrit van Wuysthoff et de ses assistants au Laos (1641–1642). 2d. édition revue et complétée. CDI du Laos, Paris 1993, ISBN 2-906652-03-2.
