= Padaek =

Lao pickled or fermented fish condiment

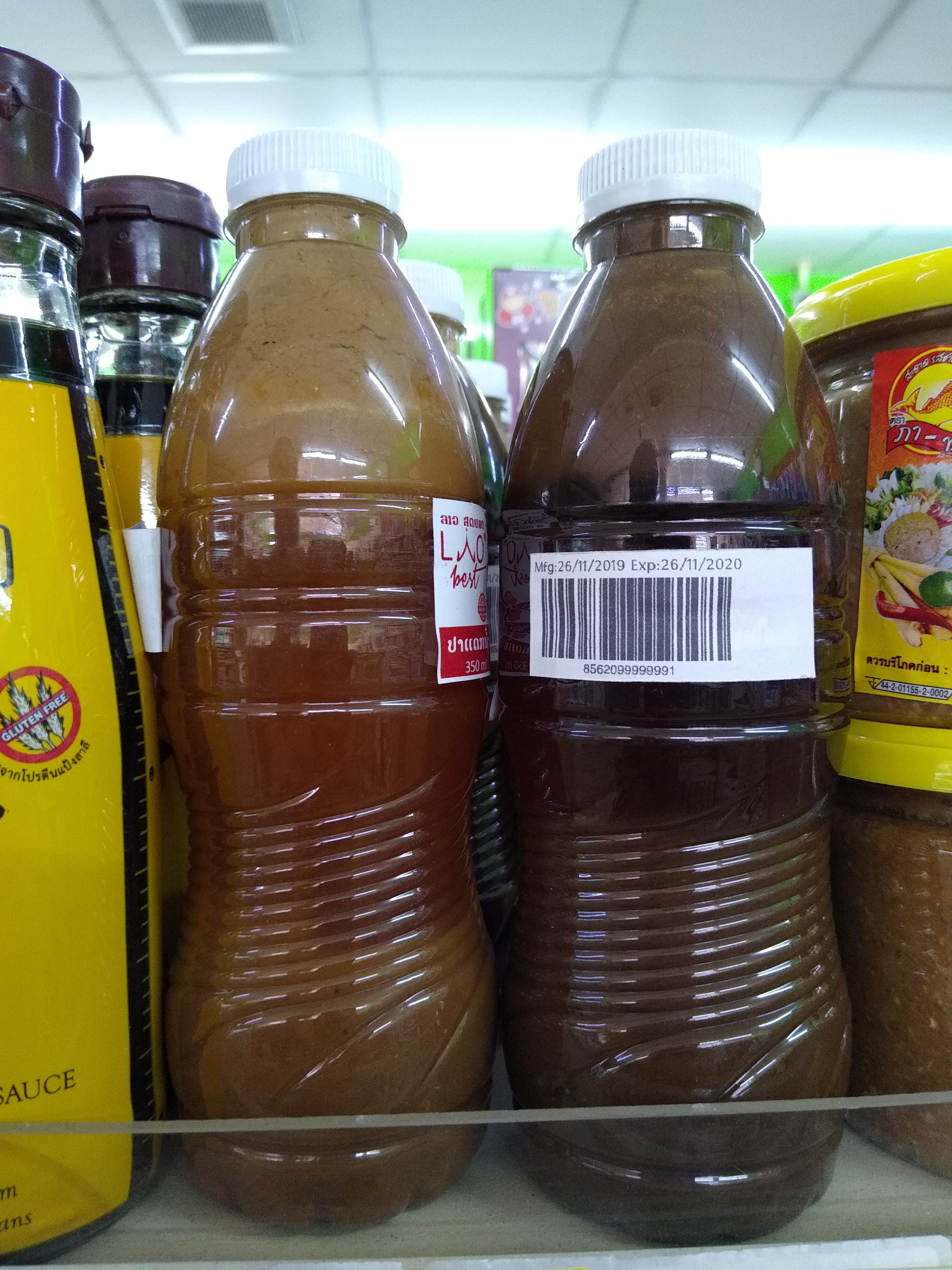
- Bottles of padaek at a convenience store in Vientiane, Laos
- Alternative names: padek
- Place of origin: Laos
- Region or state: Southeast Asia
- Associated cuisine: Lao
- Main ingredients: fermented fish
- Similar dishes: prahok, pla ra, ngapi, bagoong

Padaek or padek (Lao: ປາແດກ) is a traditional Lao condiment made from pickled or fermented fish that has been cured. It often contains chunks of fish and is thicker, as well as more seasoned than fish sauce. Unlike other versions of fish sauce in Southeast Asia, padaek is made from freshwater fish, owing to the landlocked nature of the former kingdom of Lan Xang. Padaek is used in many Lao dishes, most notably green papaya salad (tam maak hoong).

== History ==
Padaek has ancient roots in the culinary traditions of the Mekong River region, particularly in the landlocked kingdom of Lan Xang (modern-day Laos), where abundant freshwater fish necessitated preservation techniques in a humid, tropical climate. Fermentation of fish with salt (and often rice bran) likely developed independently in Southeast Asia as a method to create shelf-stable protein sources and umami-rich seasonings, with parallels to regional variants like Thai pla ra and Cambodian prahok.

The earliest potential European observations of fermented fish preparations in Laos date to the 17th century. Dutch merchant Gerrit van Wuysthoff, during his 1641–1642 expedition to Lan Xang, documented a rice-based diet heavily supplemented by river fish, including preserved items served in meals and as provisions during travels. His journal describes pungent condiments and preserved fish products integral to local sustenance.

Contemporary Italian Jesuit missionary Giovanni Maria Leria (1642–1647) and Giovanni Filippo de Marini (whose 1663 account incorporates Leria's reports) provided further descriptions of Lao markets, meals, and society, noting rice-fish diets and padaek condiments.

Later European travellers in the 19th and early 20th centuries, such as members of the Mekong Exploration Commission and French explorers, encountered Lao food culture amid colonial-era documentation, contributing to broader awareness of regional fermented fish products. By the 20th century, ethnographic works and colonial expositions highlighted traditional Lao preservation methods, including fermented fish, as key elements of local cuisine.

== Cultural significance ==
Padaek embodies the bold, fermented flavors of Lao foodways, distinguishing them from neighboring cuisines. Along with sticky rice (the staple eaten by hand), stilt houses (traditional elevated homes), and the khene (bamboo mouth organ), these elements form core markers of Lao identity.

A well-known Lao proverb defines the ethnic identity of the Lao people through their lifestyle and diet: A person living under a stilted house, who eats sticky rice and plays/listens to the khene is likely to be Lao or associated with the Lao people. While padaek is not always mentioned in every version of this specific oral rhyme, it is functionally inseparable from the "sticky rice" component, as padaek is the primary seasoning used to accompany nearly every meal where sticky rice is the staple.

The food (sticky rice and padaek), the architecture (houses on stilts), and the music (the khene) is used by Lao people both in Laos and in the diaspora to maintain a sense of shared heritage. These sayings underscore how padaek, like sticky rice, is not just food but a symbol of Lao heritage and communal life.

== Differences from other fish sauces ==
Compared to nam pla or Vietnamese nước mắm, padaek is thicker, less filtered, and fermented longer, resulting in a more robust, "funky" profile. It is essential in authentic Lao dishes and less interchangeable with clearer fish sauces.

Padaek remains a homemade staple in Lao households, though commercial versions are increasingly available internationally.

== Uses in cuisine ==
Padaek is a foundational ingredient in Lao cooking, used both as a seasoning and a dipping sauce (jaew). It appears in:

- Soups and stews, like tom padaek or kaeng dishes.
- Dips (jaew padaek), often mixed with chilies, garlic, shallots, and lime.
- Salads such as tam mak hoong (papaya salad), where it adds funk and saltiness.
- As a direct condiment, eaten with sticky rice (khao niao), vegetables, or grilled meats.

Unlike clearer fish sauces, padaek is rarely strained; the solids are prized for texture and flavor.

== See also ==
- Prahok – Cambodian salted and fermented fish paste
- Pla ra – Southeast Asian fermented fish seasoning
- Budu – Fish sauce originating from east coast of Peninsular Malaysia
- Conpoy – Cantonese dried scallop
- Mắm nêm – Vietnamese fermented fish sauce
- Ngapi – Seafood paste used in Burmese cuisine
- Patís - Philippine fish sauce
