= Phia Sing =

Chaleunsilp Phia Sing (Luang Prabang, c. 1898–1967) was a royal chef and master of ceremonies to the kings of Laos, and in this capacity he worked at the Royal Palace in Luang Prabang. He was also, according to Alan Davidson, "physician, architect, choreographer, sculptor, painter and poet". In addition he was mentor to the Laotian princes Souvanna Phouma and Souvannavong, and accompanied them when they studied at the University of Hanoi in the 1920s.

Shortly before his death Phia Sing wrote out in two notebooks the recipes used by him as royal chef. He entrusted them to prince Souvanna Phouma, who lent them to Alan Davidson in 1974. Davidson published some of the recipes in his Fish and Fish Dishes of Laos in 1975, and afterwards arranged for them to be translated in full by Phouangphet Vannithone and Boon Song Klausner. They were published in a bilingual edition, illustrated by Soun Vannithone, in 1981.

== Bibliography ==
- Alan Davidson, Fish and fish dishes of Laos, 1975. ISBN 0-907325-95-5
- Phia Sing, Traditional Recipes of Laos, 1981. ISBN 0-907325-02-5
