= Pulut tai tai =

Nyonya glutinous rice dessert

Pulut tai tai/Pulut tekan
- Course: Dessert; snack
- Place of origin: Malaysia
- Region or state: Melaka; Penang
- Serving temperature: Room temperature
- Main ingredients: Glutinous rice steamed in coconut milk, then dyed with bunga telang

Pulut tai tai, pulut tekan or pulut tetal is a Nyonya glutinous rice dessert. Originating from Melaka, Malaysia, it is also commonly served in other states in the country as well.

== Etymology ==
The name pulut tai tai is derived from the word pulut meaning glutinous rice and tai tai referring to a rich man's wife. The dessert is said to only be served to wives of rich men in the past. The word tekan in the other name pulut tekan refers to the Malay word meaning to press or to apply pressure. This refers to the technique used in shaping the dessert during preparation. Another name for the dessert pulut tetal refers to the Malay word tetal which means compact or dense.

== Preparation ==
Glutinous rice (pulut) is steamed in coconut milk. The rice is then dyed blue with bunga telang (Clitoria ternatea). It is usually served with kaya as a dipping.

== Similar dishes ==
It is different from, and often confused with nasi kerabu, which originated from Kelantan. Both pulut tai tai and nasi kerabu are dyed blue with the same bunga telang flower.
