= Butterfly pea flower tea =

Herbal tea

Butterfly pea flower Tea
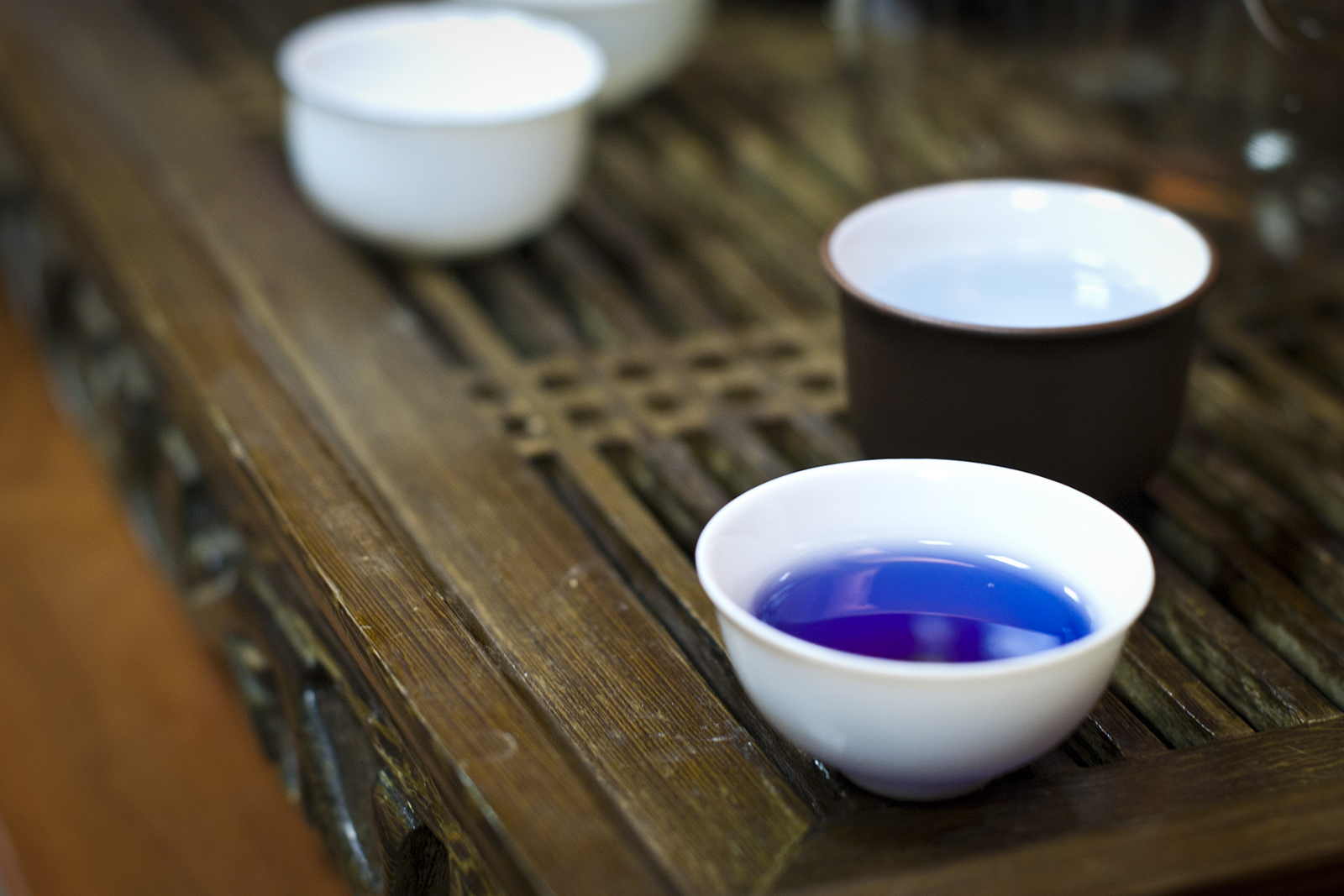
- Alternative names: Butterfly-pea leaf tea
- Type: Herbal tea
- Course: Drink
- Region or state: South East Asia
- Cooking time
- Serving temperature: Hot or cold
- Main ingredients: Butterfly-pea flowers
- Ingredients generally used: dried lemongrass
- Variations: nam dok anchan

Butterfly pea flower tea, commonly known as blue tea, is a caffeine-free herbal beverage (Note: also known as a tisane) made from decoction or infusion of the flower petals or whole flower of the Clitoria ternatea plant, alternatively known as butterfly pea, Aprajita, Asian pigeonwings, blue pea, Blue Tea Flowers, or Cordofan pea.

Derived from a plant that is common to most South East Asian countries, butterfly pea flower tea has been brewed for centuries but only recently been introduced to tea drinkers outside the indigenous area. Butterfly pea flower tea has a distinctive tint from the deep blue color of the petals that has made the plant a widely used dye for centuries. Tea changes color based on the pH level of the substance added to it. Adding acidic ingredients like lemon juice to the tea will turn it purple.

Clitoria flowers or blue tea flowers are used for their supposed medicinal properties in Ayurveda.

== Origins ==
Clitoria ternatea is a plant from the family Fabaceae and is commonly found throughout South East Asia. The bright blue petals from the flowers of the butterfly-pea plant have been used as an ingredient in herbal tea drinks throughout the region for centuries as well as used in cooking. The blue flower imparts its blue color when steeped in warm or hot water, leading it to being used as a dye, as well as to add color to various foods such as the rice dish nasi kerabu.

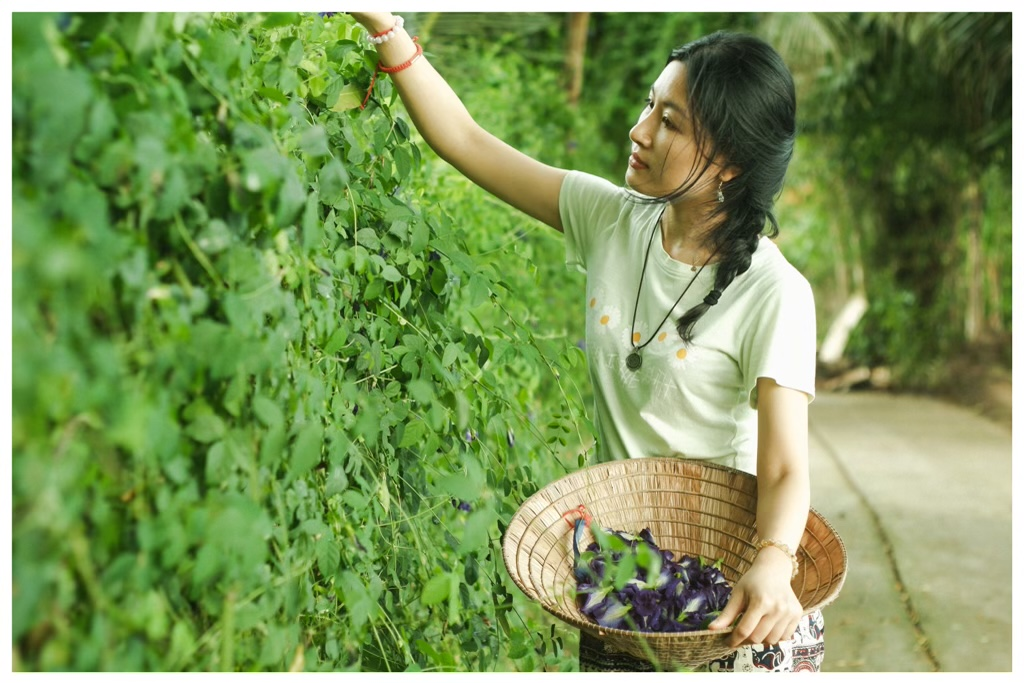
Vietnamese woman collecting butterfly pea flowers in her nón lá

In Thailand and Vietnam the butterfly blue pea flower tea is commonly mixed with honey and lemon for a drink usually served after dinner, or a refreshment at hotels and spas, a preparation called nam dok anchan in Thai. The nam dok anchan drink has been described as being a typical local drink like chamomile tea is in other parts of the world. The tea is found in both hot and cold varieties, where the cold version is often mixed with honey, mint, cinnamon, passion fruit, and ginger.

For centuries, butterfly pea flower tea was only known in South East Asia but in recent years, through the proliferation of travel shows and food blogging, it has become known outside its area of origin. It is not readily available in supermarkets, primarily offered by specialty online retailers.

The flavor of the tea has been described by Bon Appétit as "earthy and woody—more similar to a fine green tea than it is to Blue Curaçao or Jolly Ranchers".

== Popularity and color properties ==
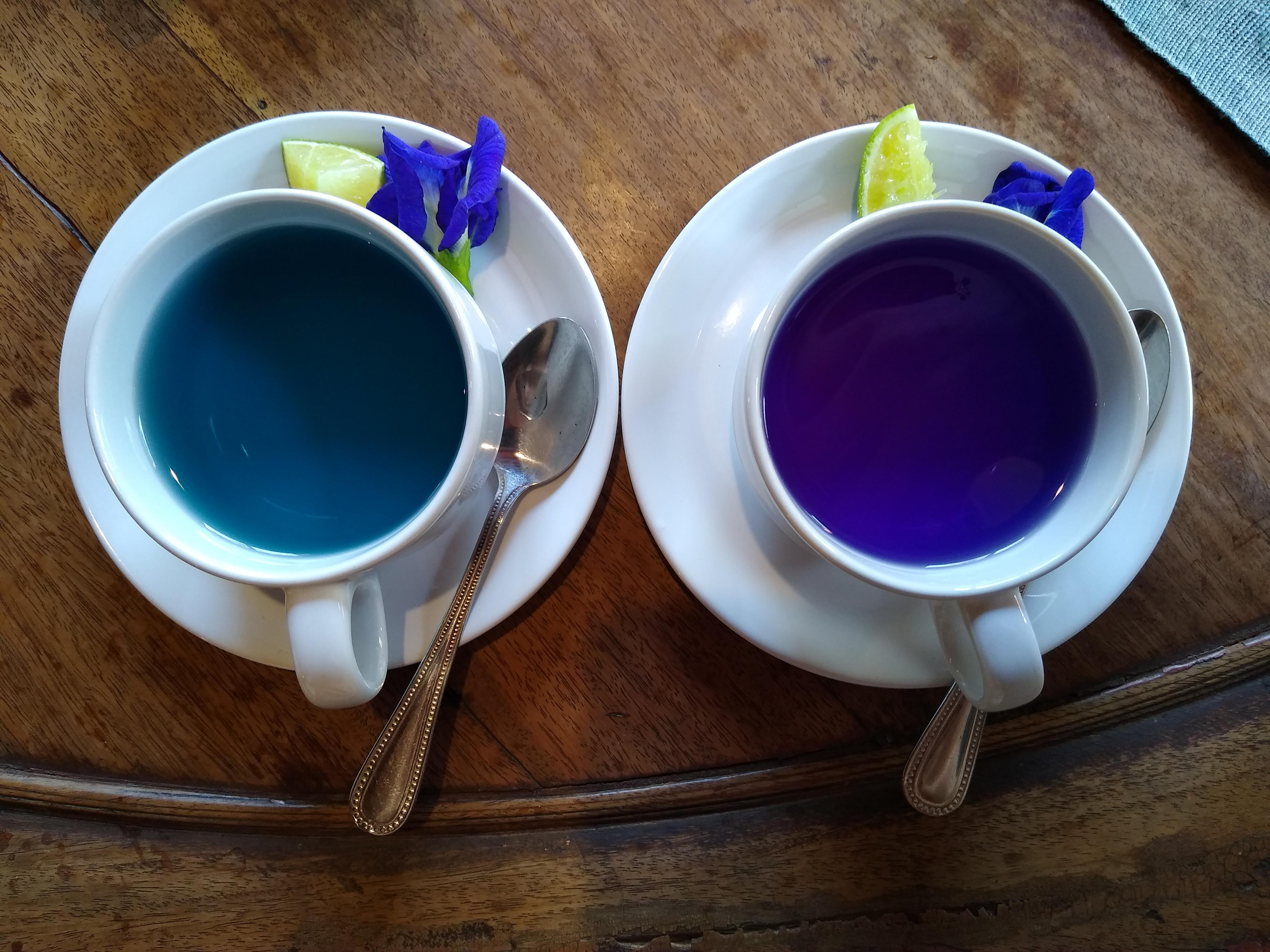
With the option of adding lime

One of the most distinctive characteristics of butterfly pea flower tea, and other drinks that use butterfly pea flower extract, is that it will change color when the pH balance changes. A deep blue tea will turn purple with the addition of lemon juice, turning a deeper shade of purple the more lemon juice is added. Mixed with fuchsia roselle hibiscus leaves the tea will turn a bright red color.

A popular use of the tea is in cocktails where the showmanship of the cocktail making incorporates the instantaneous color change in front of the patron that ordered the drink. Other uses included cocktails or punch bowls where the tea is frozen into ice cubes, causing the drink to change color as the ice cube dissolves leading to what has been labeled as a "mood ring cocktail".

As of September 2, 2021, the US Food and Drug Administration declared the additive "butterfly pea flower extract" to be exempt from certification and safe for use.

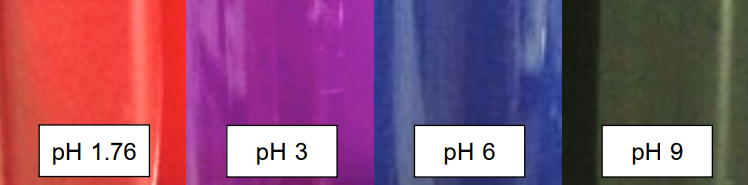
Color change in different pH of Clitoria ternatea extract

== See also ==
- List of hot beverages
