= Cliotide =

Group of related peptides

Cliotides are a group of related peptides that have been isolated from the heat-stable fraction of Clitoria ternatea (Cliotides) extracts. Cliotides belong to a larger classification of peptides, the cyclotides.

Preliminary studies show that cliotides display a variety of biochemical properties which have attracted scientific interest in the possibility of developing antimicrobial and anti-cancer agents from them.

Cliotides display in vitro antimicrobial activity against E. coli, K. pneumoniae, and P. aeruginosa and cytotoxicity against HeLa cells.

Cliotides also possess immunostimulating activity. At a concentration of 1 μM, cationic cliotides are capable of augmenting the secretion of various cytokines and chemokines in human monocytes at both resting and LPS-stimulated states. Chemokines such as RANTES, MIP-1β, MIP-1α, IP-10, IL-8 and TNF-α were among the most upregulated with up to 129-fold increase in secretion level.

Different cyclotides have protein sequences which engender different biophysical and functional properties, to be expressed in different organs. For example, cyclotides from aerial organs possess tighter binding activity to insect-like membranes, whereas cyclotides from roots and seed, two organs that contact soil, have relatively higher effectiveness against juveniles of the model nematode Caenorhabditis elegans. The isolated Cter M cyclotide that is highly expressed in aerial organs was shown to effectively slow the growth and kill moth larvae.

The enzyme responsible for the biosynthesis and backbone cyclization of cliotides has recently been isolated. It was named butelase 1 in accordance with its local name in Malaysia and Singapore (bunga telang ligase). Butelase 1 is the fastest peptide ligase known capable of catalyzing peptide cyclization at an extraordinary efficiency.
