= Khanom krok bai toei =

Thai dessert

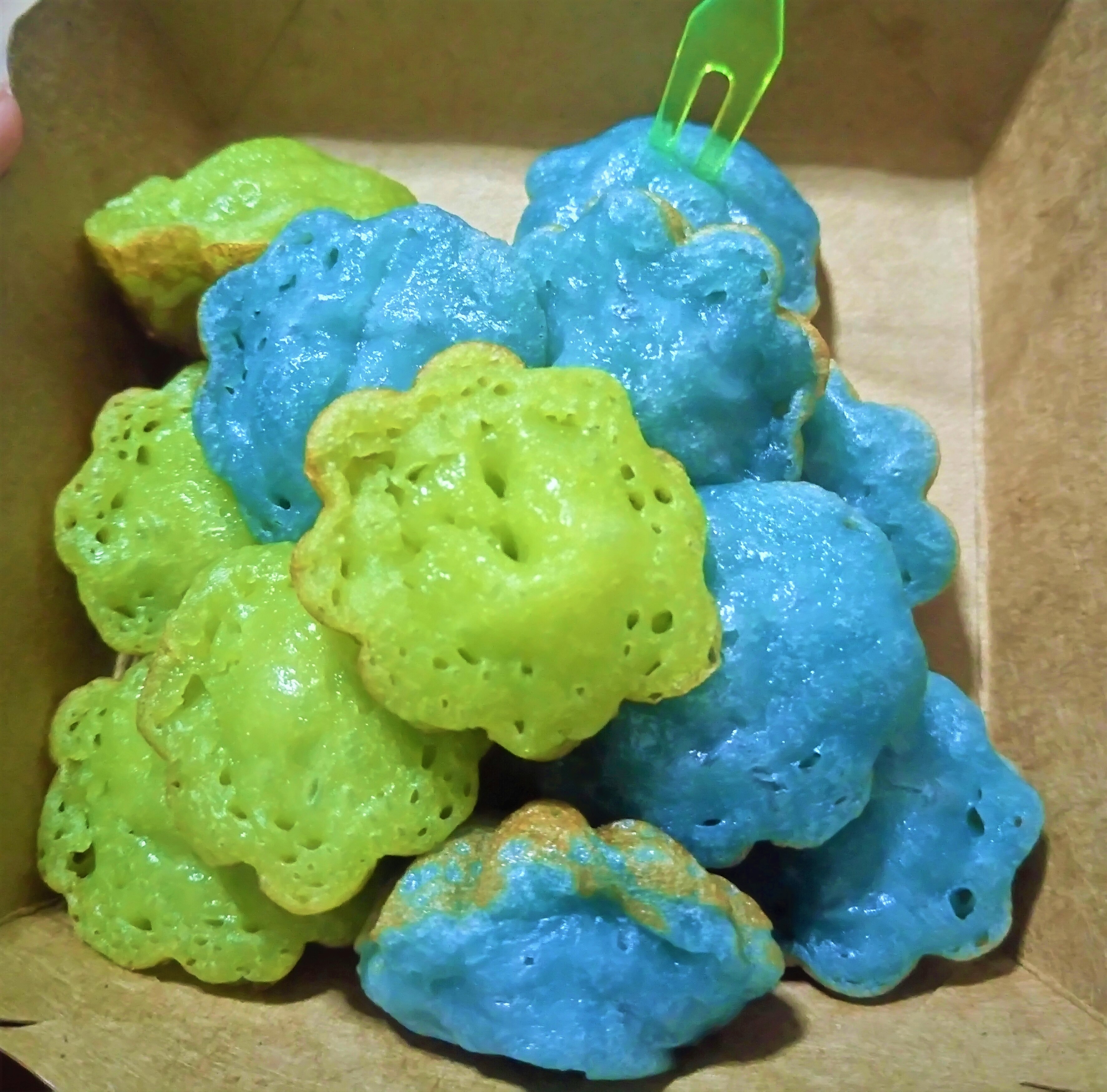
Khanom krok bai toei

Khanom krok bai toei (Thai: ขนมครกใบเตย, romanized: khonmokrokbaitœ̄i, pronounced [kʰā.nǒm kʰrók bāj tɤ̄ːj]) or Khanom krok Singapore (Thai: ขนมครกสิงคโปร์, romanized: khonmokroksingpō, pronounced [kʰā.nǒm kʰrók sǐŋ.kʰā.pōː]) is a Thai dessert created by Thai people; the name khanom krok Singapore came from one of the main ingredients, tapioca starch. Thai people formerly called tapioca flour "Singapore flour", hence khanom khrok Singapore; the word khanom means dessert in Thailand. This Thai dessert is rather hard to find at present, found at some Thai dessert shops, some famous markets or department stores such as Siam Square market. Khanom khrok bai toei is shaped like a flower or a small dish, depending on the indented frying pan used to make it. It is usually a fresh green color which comes from pandan leaves. Sometimes, pastry chefs use parts of other plants instead of pandan leaves such as the blue butterfly pea flower, so this dessert can have other colors.

The name khanom krok bai toei is similar to khanom krok but the taste is different; khanom khrok also fragrant, sweet and the texture is also smooth from the coconut milk but khanom khrok bai toei has flavor of pandan. (The word bai toei means "pandan leaf" in Thai.) Moreover, khanom khrok has a soft cream made of coconut milk and rice flour in the middle but khanom khrok bai toei does not, but rather is similar to a pancake.

== Ingredients ==
Khanom krok bai toei has three main ingredients, tapioca flour, coconut milk, and pandan leaves. Other ingredients are wheat flour, salt, baking powder, eggs, and sugar.

== See also ==
- Thai cuisine
- List of Thai desserts
