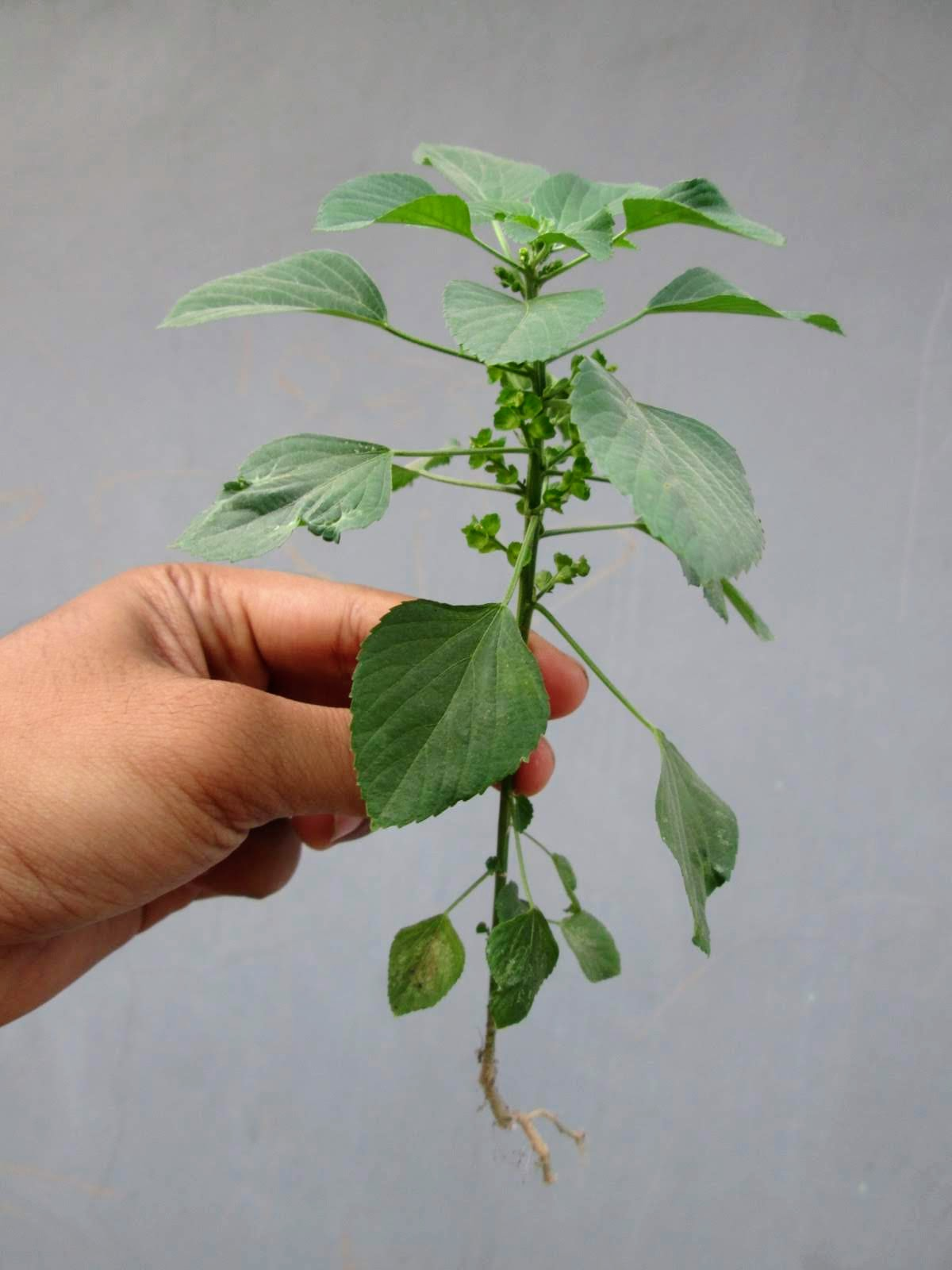

Scientific classification
- Kingdom: Plantae
- Clade: Tracheophytes
- Clade: Angiosperms
- Clade: Eudicots
- Clade: Rosids
- Order: Malpighiales
- Family: Euphorbiaceae
- Subtribe: Acalyphinae
- Genus: Acalypha
- Species: A. indica

Binomial name
- Acalypha indica L.

Synonyms
- Acalypha bailloniana Müll.Arg.; Acalypha canescens Benth., nom. nud.; Acalypha bailloniana Müll.Arg.; Acalypha caroliniana Blanco, nom. illeg.; Acalypha chinensis Benth.; Acalypha ciliata Benth., nom. nud.; Acalypha cupamenii Dragend.; Acalypha decidua Forssk.; Acalypha fimbriata Baill.; Acalypha indica var. bailloniana (Müll.Arg.) Hutch.; Acalypha indica var. minima (H.Keng) S.F.Huang & T.C.Huang; Acalypha minima H.Keng; Acalypha somalensis Pax; Acalypha somalium Müll.Arg.; Acalypha spicata Forssk.; Cupamenis indica (L.) Raf.; Ricinocarpus baillonianus (Müll.Arg.) Kuntze; Ricinocarpus deciduus (Forssk.) Kuntze; Synonym Ricinocarpus indicus (L.) Kuntze

= Acalypha indica =

Species of flowering plant

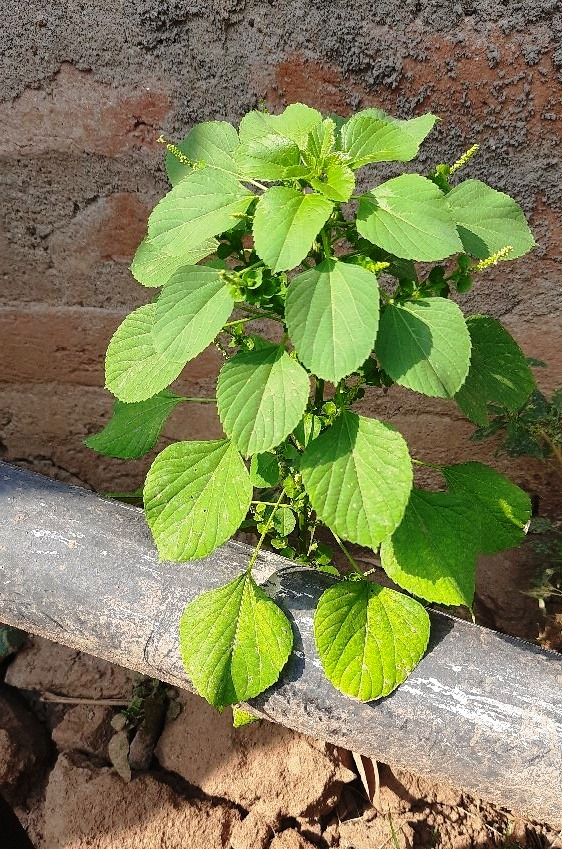
Acalypha indica in Beliatore West Bengal, India

Acalypha indica (English: Indian acalypha, Indian mercury, Indian copperleaf, Indian nettle, three-seeded mercury) is an herbaceous annual that has catkin-like inflorescences with cup-shaped involucres surrounding the minute flowers. It is mainly known for its root being attractive to domestic cats, and for its various medicinal uses. It occurs throughout the Tropics.

== Description ==
An erect annual herb that can be easily distinguished by the cup-shaped involucre that surrounds the small flowers in the catkin-like inflorescence.

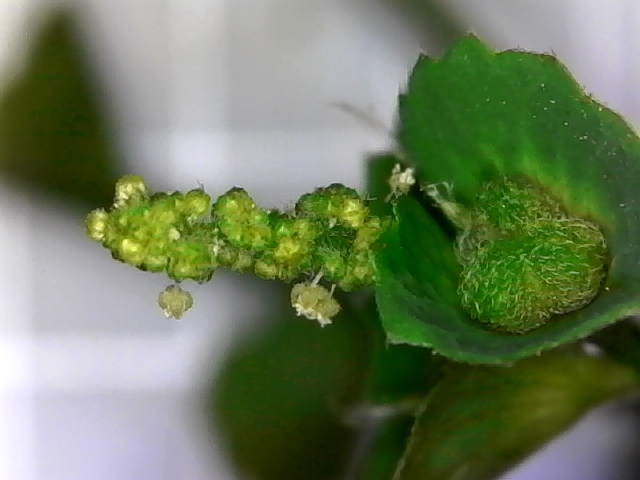
Inflorescence of Indian acalypha. The male flowers are borne on the upper part of the inflorescence are without bracts. Cup-like bract surround the female flowers. (It doesn't have inflorescence hood)

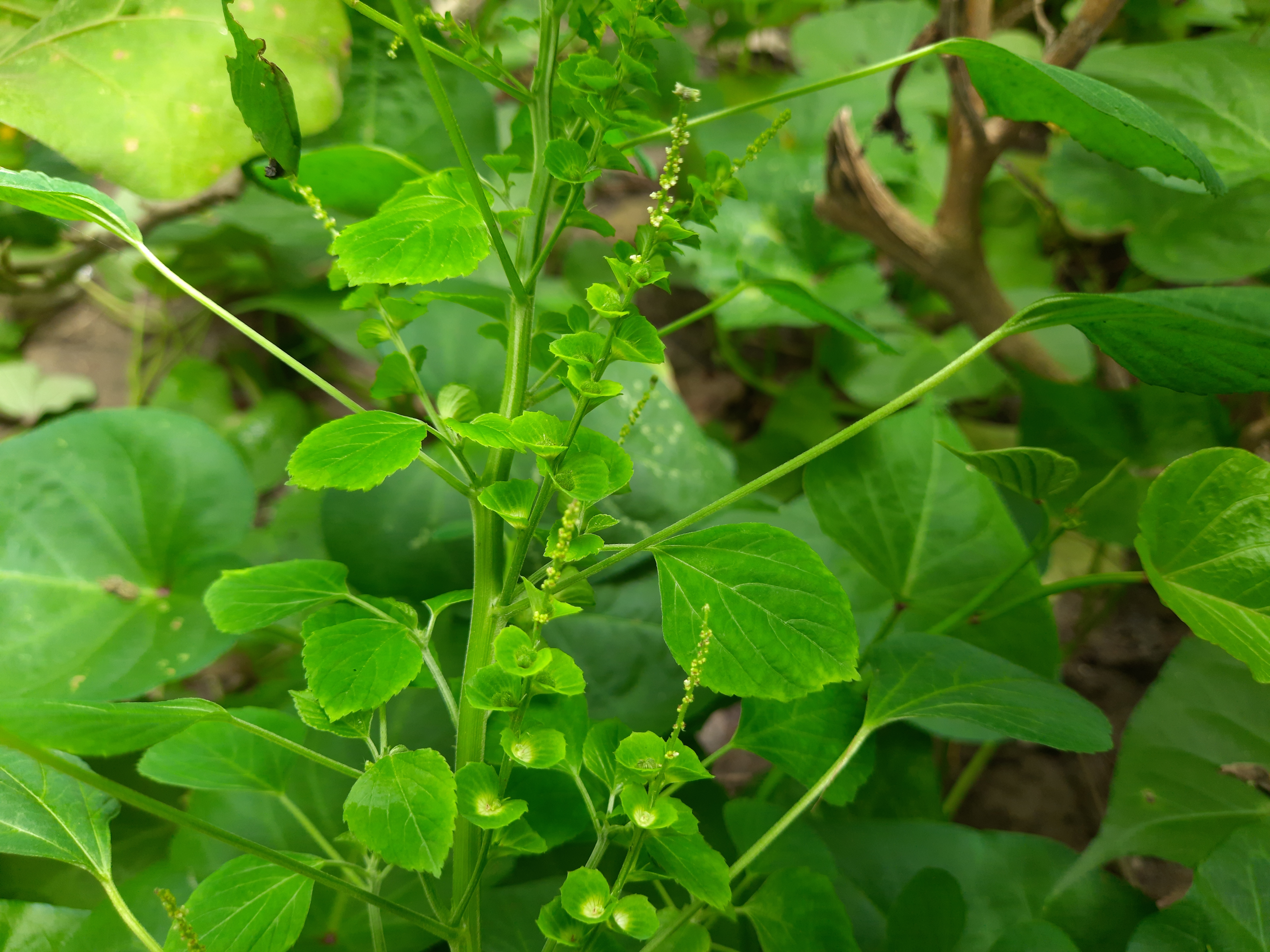
Inflorescence of Indian acalypha.(Inflorescence hood is visible)

It can grow up to 1.2 m (3.9 ft) tall in favorable circumstances, but is usually smaller. The leaves are broad ovate, 1.2 cm–6.5 cm × 1 cm–4 cm (0.47 in–2.56 in × 0.39 in–1.57 in). The leaf base is rounded to shortly attenuate. The leaf margin is basally 5-nerved and is crenate-serrate with an acute or obtuse apex. The petiole is 1.5–5.5 cm (0.59–2.17 in) long.

=== Flowers ===
The flower spikes are axillary, 2.5–6 cm (0.98–2.36 in) long, monoecious, with a rachis terminating in a triradiate hood.

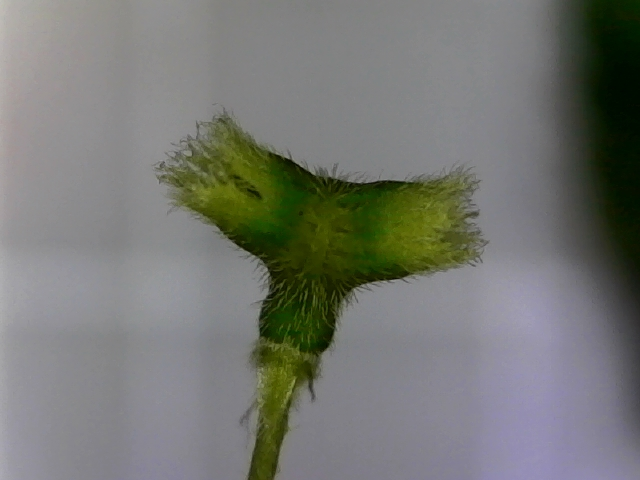
Close up of the inflorescence hood of Indian acalypha

The tiny male flowers are white-green, located on the upper part of the flower spikes, and are ebracteate, minute, and clustered with vermiculiform anthers. The pollens are roughly round and approximately 10–12 microns in diameter.

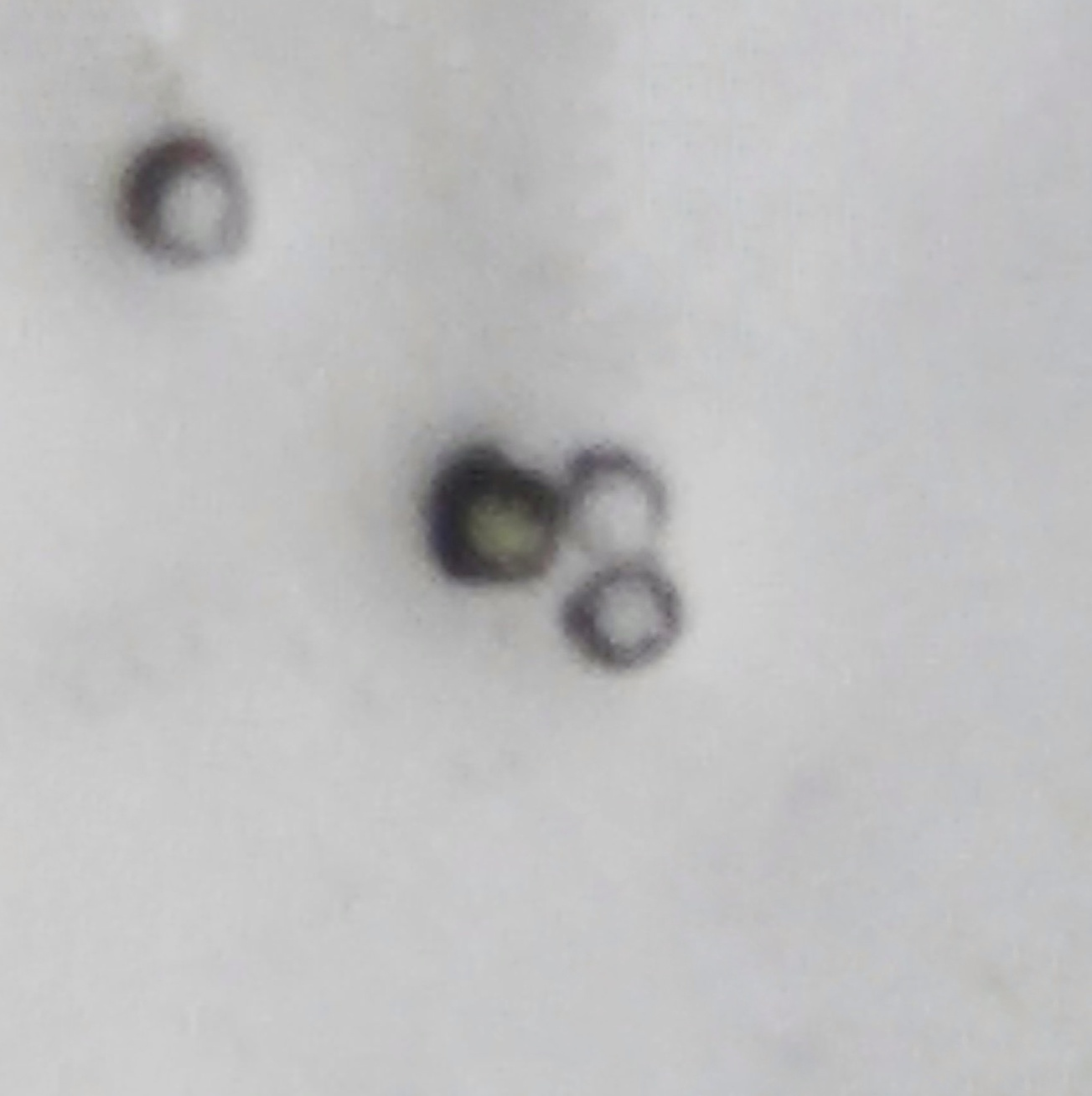
Pollens of Acalypha indica

The green female flowers are located lower on the spikes, and are subtended by 3–7 mm (0.12–0.28 in) long suborbicular-cuneiform, many-nerved, toothed bracts that are foliaceous. The ovary is hispid, 3-lobed. Styles are 3, each 2-fid. Capsules are hispid, 3-valved and concealed by a bract. The stem is striate (longitudinally ribbed) and pubescent. The fruit is 1.5–2 mm (0.059–0.079 in), 3-lobed, tuberculate and pubescent.

== Habitat ==
It grows in disturbed places such as waste lands, road sides, crevices in walls. It also grows in rocky hillsides, forest edges and river banks. It prefers moist and shaded places. It grows from sea-level up to 1350 m altitude.

== Geographic distribution ==
Acalypha indica occurs widely throughout the Old World tropics. In Africa, it occurs in Nigeria in West Africa and further widely throughout tropical Africa and the Indian Ocean islands. It also occurs in India, South East Asia, Yemen, and Oceania. It has been introduced to the New World Tropics.

== Effect on domestic cats ==
Cat plays with Acalypha indica

Throughout the area where the plant grows, it is widely known for its effect on domestic cats, which react very strongly and favorably to the root of the plant. In this regard it is very similar to catnip, but the effect is much more pronounced. For this reason it is called kuppaimeni/குப்பைமேனி in Tamil, puchamayakki/പൂച്ചമയക്കി in Malayalam, biralhanchi/biralkanduni (বিড়াল হাঁচি/বিড়ালকান্দুনি) in Bengali, pokok kucing galak (excited cat tree) in Malay, kuppameniya (කුප්පමේනියා) in Sinhala, anting-anting in Indonesia, and ตำแยแมว (cat nettle) in Thai.

== Traditional uses ==
This plant is held in high esteem in traditional Tamil Siddha medicine as it is believed to rejuvenate the body. The plant has also been eaten as a vegetable in Africa and India, but care is needed when eating it since it contains several alkaloids as well as hydrocyanic acid.

Analysis of the shoots yielded per 100 g edible portion: water 80 g, energy 269 kJ (64 kcal), protein 6.7 g, fat 1.4 g, carbohydrate 6 g, fiber 2.3 g, Ca 667 mg, P 99 mg, Fe 17 mg and ascorbic acid 147 mg.

=== Medicinal uses ===
The plant has many traditional medicinal uses. In Madagascar, the crushed plant is used for skin parasites. In Mauritius, the sap of crushed leaves mixed with salt, or a decoction of plant, is used for scabies and other skin problems. In the Seychelles and Réunion, a root infusion or decoction is taken for asthma, and also to clean the liver and kidneys. The root decoction is also taken for intestinal worms and stomach ache. The leaf sap is taken as an emetic. An infusion together with the roots of Tylophora indica is taken in Réunion as an emetic in the case of poisoning. A leaf infusion is also taken as a purgative and vermifuge in Réunion and Madagascar. In East Africa sap of the leaves is used for eye infections. Leaf powder is used for maggot-infested wounds. Acalypha indica is listed in the Pharmacopoeia of India as an expectorant to treat asthma and pneumonia. It was formerly listed in the British Pharmacopoeia.

== Chemical constituents ==
The arial parts contain a cyanogenic glycoside called acalyphin (a 3-cyanopyridone derivative) as well as flavonoids, such as kaempferol glycosides mauritianin, clitorin, nicotiflorin, and biorobin. Tannins, β-sitosterol, acalyphamide, aurantiamide, succinimide, and flindersin (a pyranoquinolinone alkaloid) have also been isolated.

The chemicals that attract cats are the iridoid compounds isodihydronepetalactone and isoiridomyrmecin.

== Medicinal effects and uses ==
Some of the chemical compounds in Acalypha indica cause dark chocolate-brown discoloration of blood, and gastrointestinal irritation in rabbits. Ingestion of Acalypha indica may lead to hemolysis in people suffering from glucose-6-phosphate dehydrogenase deficiency. Acalyphin is used as a substitute for ipecacuanha, a vermifuge, expectorant and emetic. Acalypha indica leaves are used in the traditional medicine of India as a jaundice remedy.
