= Clitorin =

Names
- IUPAC name 3-[(2S,3R,4S,5S,6R)-4,5-dihydroxy-3-[(2R,3R,4R,5R,6S)-3,4,5-trihydroxy-6-methyloxan-2-yl]oxy-6-[[(2R,3R,4R,5R,6S)-3,4,5-trihydroxy-6-methyloxan-2-yl]oxymethyl]oxan-2-yl]oxy-5,7-dihydroxy-2-(4-hydroxyphenyl)chromen-4-one

Identifiers
CAS Number	55804-74-5
3D model (JSmol)	Interactive image
ChemSpider	9767679
PubChem CID	11592917
- InChI: InChI=1S/C33H40O19/c1-10-19(37)23(41)26(44)31(47-10)46-9-17-21(39)25(43)30(52-32-27(45)24(42)20(38)11(2)48-32)33(50-17)51-29-22(40)18-15(36)7-14(35)8-16(18)49-28(29)12-3-5-13(34)6-4-12/h3-8,10-11,17,19-21,23-27,30-39,41-45H,9H2,1-2H3/t10-,11-,17+,19-,20-,21+,23+,24+,25-,26+,27+,30+,31+,32-,33-/m0/s1 Key: WRXVPTMENPZUIZ-QEZWUOJGSA-N
- SMILES: C[C@H]1[C@@H]([C@H]([C@H]([C@@H](O1)OC[C@@H]2[C@H]([C@@H]([C@H]([C@@H](O2)OC3=C(OC4=CC(=CC(=C4C3=O)O)O)C5=CC=C(C=C5)O)O[C@H]6[C@@H]([C@@H]([C@H]([C@@H](O6)C)O)O)O)O)O)O)O)O

Properties
Chemical formula	C_{33}H_{40}O_{19}
Molar mass	740.664 g·mol^{−1}
- Except where otherwise noted, data are given for materials in their standard state (at 25 °C [77 °F], 100 kPa). Infobox references

Clitorin is a natural product that is a kaempferol glycoside.

It has been found in Clitoria ternatea, Saxifraga cuneifolia, Diospyros rhombifolia and Acalypha indica.

Dried papaya leaf juice contains about 0.7% clitorin.
