= Cyclotide =

Disulfide-rich ring peptides found in plants

Cyclotide family
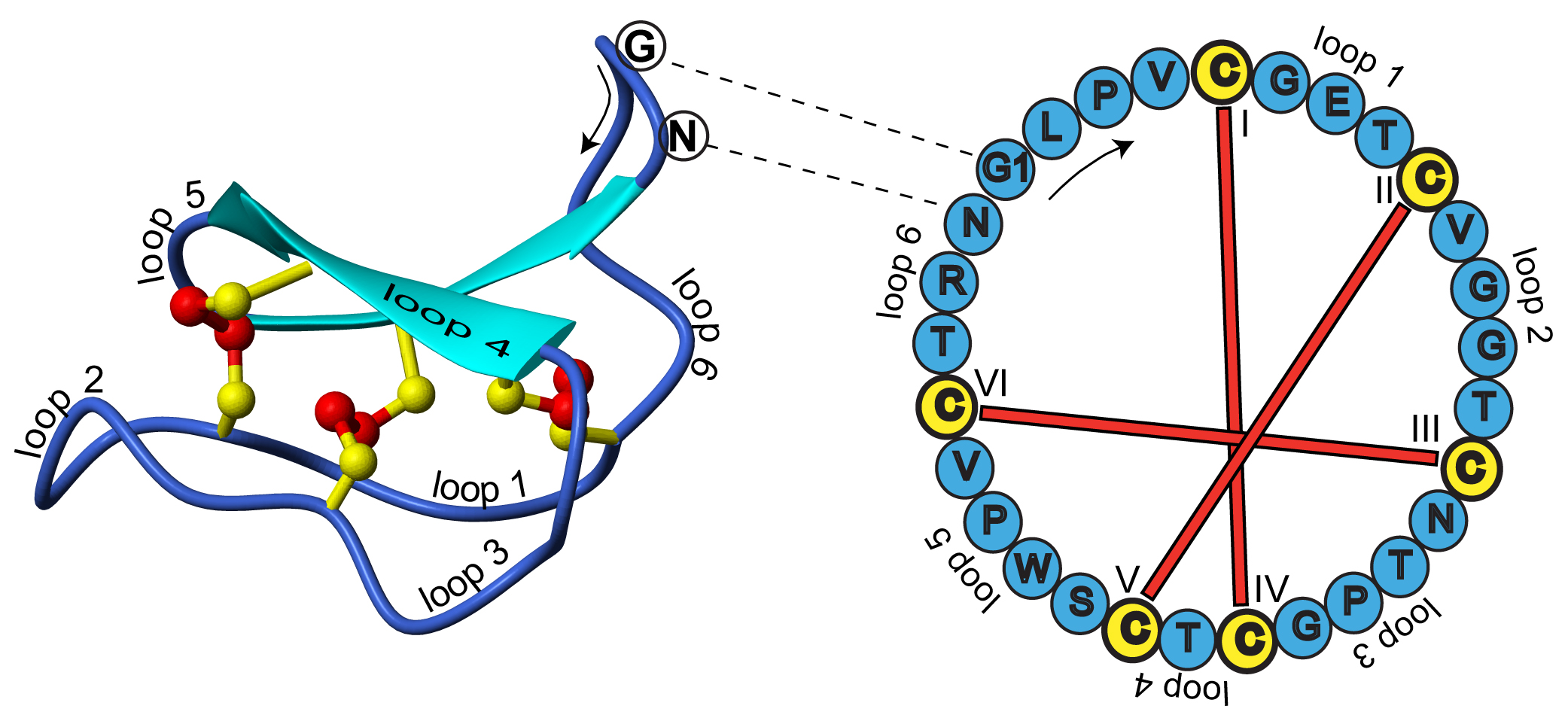
- Structure and sequence of the prototypic cyclotide kalata B1

Identifiers
- Symbol: Cyclotide
- Pfam: PF03784
- InterPro: IPR005535
- PROSITE: PDOC51052
- SCOP2: 1kal / SCOPe / SUPFAM
- OPM superfamily: 112
- OPM protein: 1nb1
Available protein structures:
- PDB: IPR005535 PF03784 (ECOD; PDBsum)
- AlphaFold: IPR005535; PF03784

In biochemistry, cyclotides are small, disulfide-rich peptides isolated from plants. Typically containing 28–37 amino acids, they are characterized by their head-to-tail cyclised peptide backbone and the interlocking arrangement of their three disulfide bonds. These combined features have been termed the cyclic cystine knot (CCK) motif. To date, over 100 cyclotides have been isolated and characterized from species of the families Rubiaceae, Violaceae, and Cucurbitaceae. Cyclotides have also been identified in agriculturally important families such as the Fabaceae and Poaceae.

== Structure ==
Cyclotides have a well-defined three-dimensional structure due to their interlocking disulfide bonds and cyclic peptide backbone. Backbone loops and selected residues are labeled on the structure to help orientation. The amino acid sequence (single-letter amino acid representation) for this peptide is indicated on the sequence diagram to the right. One of the interesting features of cyclic peptides is that knowledge of the peptide sequence does not reveal the ancestral head and tail; knowledge of the gene sequence is required for this. In the case of kalata B1 the indicated glycine (G) and asparagine (N) amino acids are the terminal residues that are linked in a peptide bond to cyclize the peptide.

== Biological function ==
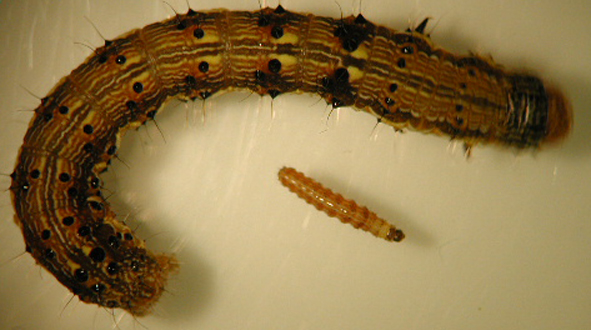
The stunting effect of kalata B1 cyclic peptide on growth and development of Helicoverpa punctigera, a caterpillar from the Lepidopteran order.

Cyclotides have been reported to have a wide range of biological activities, including anti-HIV, insecticidal, anti-tumour, antifouling, anti-microbial, hemolytic, neurotensin antagonism, trypsin inhibition, and uterotonic activities. An ability to induce uterine contractions was what prompted the initial discovery of kalata B1.

The potent insecticidal activity of cyclotides kalata B1 and kalata B2 has prompted the belief that cyclotides act as plant host-defence agents. The observations that dozens or more cyclotides may be present in a single plant and the cyclotide architecture comprises a conserved core onto which a series of hypervariable loops is displayed suggest that cyclotides may be able to target many pests/pathogens simultaneously.

== Amino-acid sequences ==
Analysis of the suite of known cyclotides reveals many sequence similarities that are important for understanding their unique physico-chemical properties, bioactivities and homology.

The cyclotides fall into two main structural subfamilies. Moebius cyclotides, the less common of the two, contain a cis-proline in loop 5 that induces a local 180° backbone twist (hence likening it to a Möbius strip), whereas bracelet cyclotides do not. There is smaller variation in sequences within these subfamilies than between them. A third subfamily of cyclotides are trypsin inhibitors and are more homologous to a family of non-cyclic trypsin inhibitors from squash plants known as knottins or inhibitor cystine knots than they are to the other cyclotides.

It is convenient to discuss sequences in terms of the backbone segments, or loops, between successive cysteine residues. The six cysteine residues are absolutely conserved throughout the cyclotide suite and presumably contribute to preserving the CCK motif. Although the cysteines appear essential to maintaining the overall fold, several other residues highly conserved in cyclotides are thought to provide additional stability.

Throughout the known cyclotides loop 1 is the most conserved. Apart from the six cysteine residues, the glutamic acid and serine/threonine residues of loop 1 are the only residues to have 100% identity across the bracelet and Möbius subfamilies. Furthermore, the remaining residue of this loop exhibits only a conservative change i.e. glycine/alanine. This loop is believed to play an important role in stabilizing the cyclotide structure through hydrogen bonding with residues from loops 3 and 5.

Loops 2-6 also have highly conserved features, including the ubiquitous presence of just a single amino acid in loop 4 that is likely involved in sidechain-sidechain hydrogen bonding. Other conserved residues include a hydroxyl-containing residue in loop 3, a glycine residue in the final position of loop 3, a basic and a proline residue in the penultimate position in loop 5 of bracelet and Möbius cyclotides respectively, and an asparagine (or occasionally aspartic acid) residue at the putative cyclisation point in loop 6. It is of interest to note that not only are certain residues highly conserved, but the backbone and side chain angles are as well.

With recent screening programs suggesting that the number of cyclotide sequences may soon reach the thousands, a database, CyBase, has been developed that offers the opportunity for comparisons of sequences and activity data for cyclotides. Several other families of circular proteins are known in bacteria, plants and animals and are also included in CyBase.

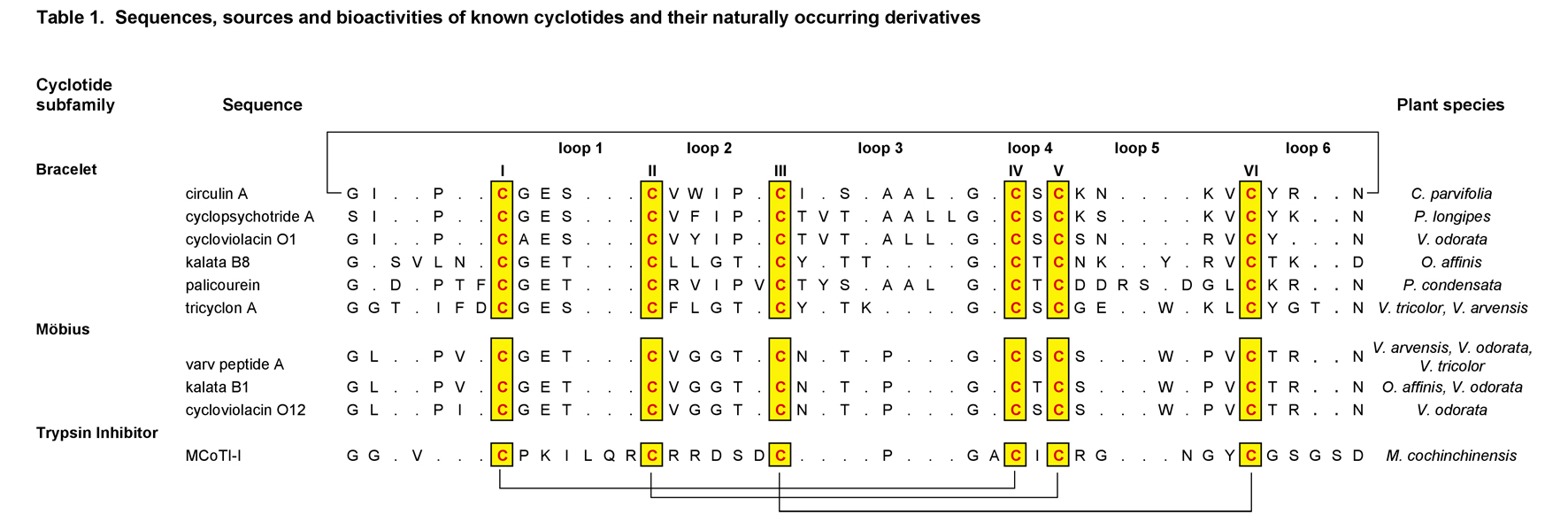
A selection of cyclotide sequences and sources

== Biosynthesis ==
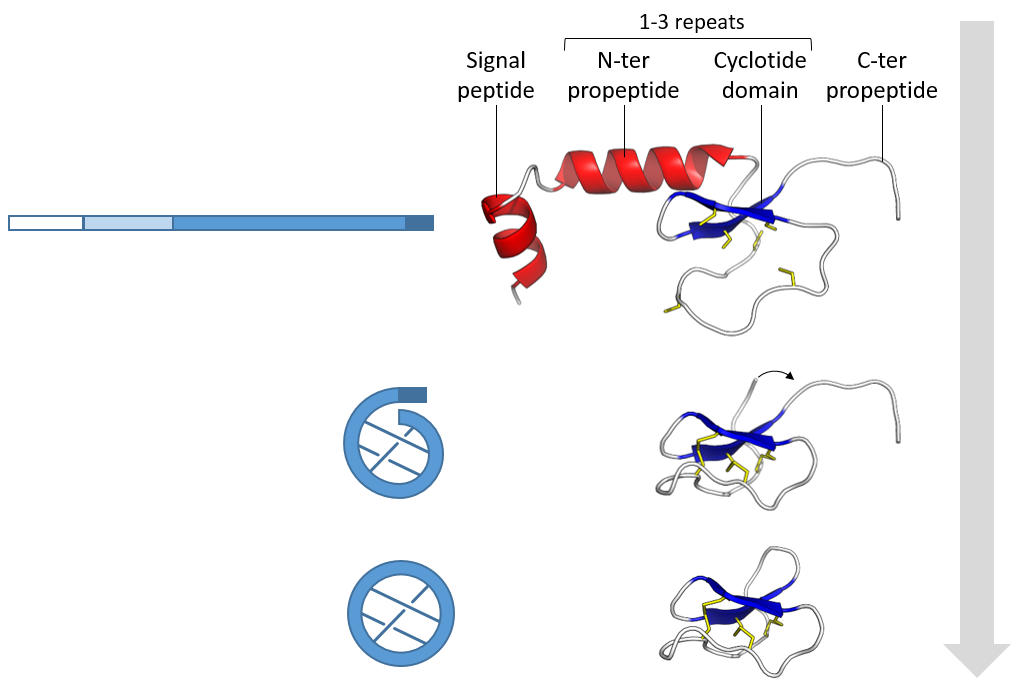
The cyclotide precursor is comprised a hydrophobic Signal peptide that targets the precursor to the Endoplasmic Reticulum (ER), an N-terminal propeptide that then targets it to the vacuole, a cyclotide domain and a final C-terminal propeptide necessary for cyclisation.The cyclotide domain folds in the ER, after which it is trafficked to the vacuole and the cyclotide domain is cyclised by an asperginyl endopeptidase. (PDB: 1WN8, 1NB1)

Plants are a rich source of ribosomally-synthesised and post-translationally modified cyclic peptides. Among these, the cyclotides are gene-coded products generated via processing of a larger precursor protein. The gene for the first such precursor is Oak1 (Oldenlandia affinis kalata clone number 1), which was shown to be responsible for the synthesis of kalata B1. The generic configuration of the precursor protein consists of an endoplasmic reticulum signal sequence, a non-conserved pro-region, a highly conserved region known as the N-terminal repeat (NTR), the mature cyclotide domain and finally a short hydrophobic C-terminal tail. The cyclotide domain may contain either one cyclotide sequence, as in the case of Oak1, or multiple copies separated by additional NTR sequences as seen for Oak2 and Oak4. In precursor proteins containing multiple cyclotide domains these can either be all identical sequences, as is the case for Oak4, or they can be different cyclotides as in Oak2 which contains sequences corresponding to kalata B3 and B6.

Recently, the enzyme responsible for the backbone cyclization of cyclotides has been isolated from the medicinal plant Clitoria ternatea. This enzyme was named butelase 1 in accordance to the local name of the plant (Bunga Telang Ligase). Butelase 1 has been shown to cyclize the linear precursor of kalata B1 with >95% yield at a remarkable rate of 5.42×10^{5} M^{−1} s^{−1}. The ligase also cyclizes various bioactive peptides of animal origin, such as human antimicrobial peptide histatin, conotoxin from cone snail and insect antimicrobial peptide thanatin.

== Applications ==
The remarkable stability of cyclotides means that they have an exciting range of potential applications centred on either their intrinsic biological activities or the possibility of using the CCK motif as a scaffold for stabilizing biologically active epitopes. Interest in these has recently intensified with the publications of a chemical methodology capable of synthetically producing cyclotides with high yields, and the amenability of the CCK framework to amino-acid substitutions. But for molecules to be useful in a therapeutic setting they require useful biopharmaceutical characteristics such as resistance to proteolysis and membrane permeability. The membrane interactive surface area and moment of the cyclotides are determinants in the prediction of their biological activities. A recent study on related cystine knot proteins as drug candidates showed that cystine knots do permeate well through rat small intestinal mucosa relative to non-cystine knot peptide drugs such as insulin and bacitracin. Furthermore, enzymatic digestion of cystine knot peptide drugs was associated with only a few proteases and it was suggested that this limitation may be overcome by mutating out particular cleavage sites. Thus, certain cystine knot proteins satisfy the basic criteria for drug delivery and represent exciting novel candidates as scaffolds for peptide drug delivery. The diverse range of intrinsic activities of cyclotides also continues to hold promise for a wide range of applications in the agricultural fields against insects and nematodes, especially those from Clitoria ternatea.

== History ==
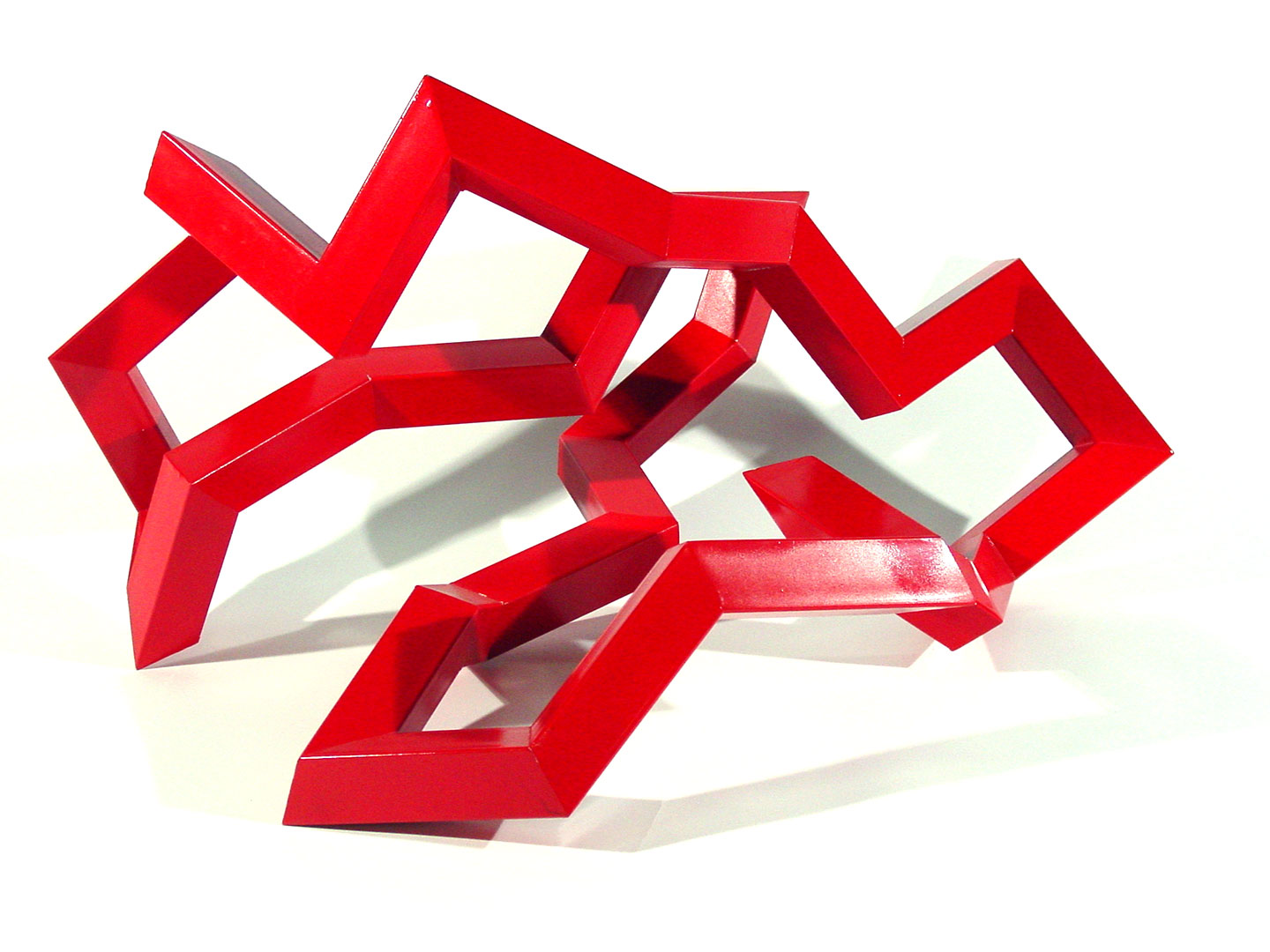
Kalata (2002) by Julian Voss-Andreae. The pictured sculpture is based on the atomic coordinates of kalata B1.

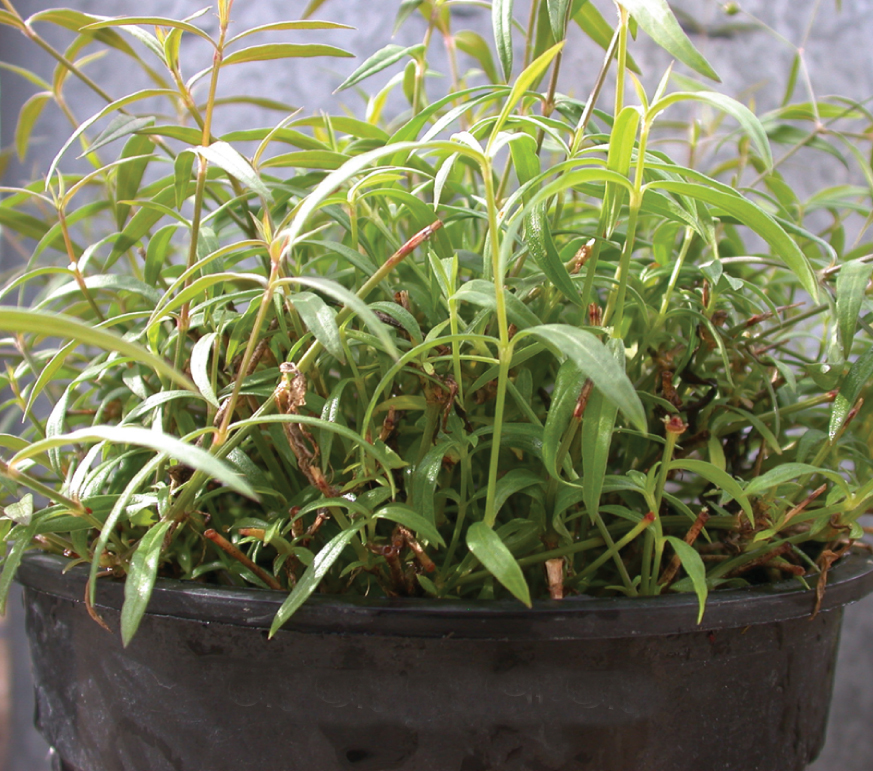
A tea made from the plant Oldenlandia affinis was used by an African tribe to induce labor and facilitate childbirth

During a Red Cross relief mission in the Democratic Republic of Congo during the 1960s, a Norwegian doctor, Lorents Gran, noted that during labor some African women used a medicinal tea made from the leaves of the plant Oldenlandia affinis to induce labor and facilitate childbirth. The active ingredient was later determined to be a cyclic peptide, named kalata B1, after the traditional name for the tea, kalata-kalata. Although in vivo studies in rats confirmed the uterotonic activity of the purified peptide, it was another 20 years before the unusual structure of the purified peptide was elucidated.

== See also ==
- Antimicrobial peptides
- Cyclic peptides
