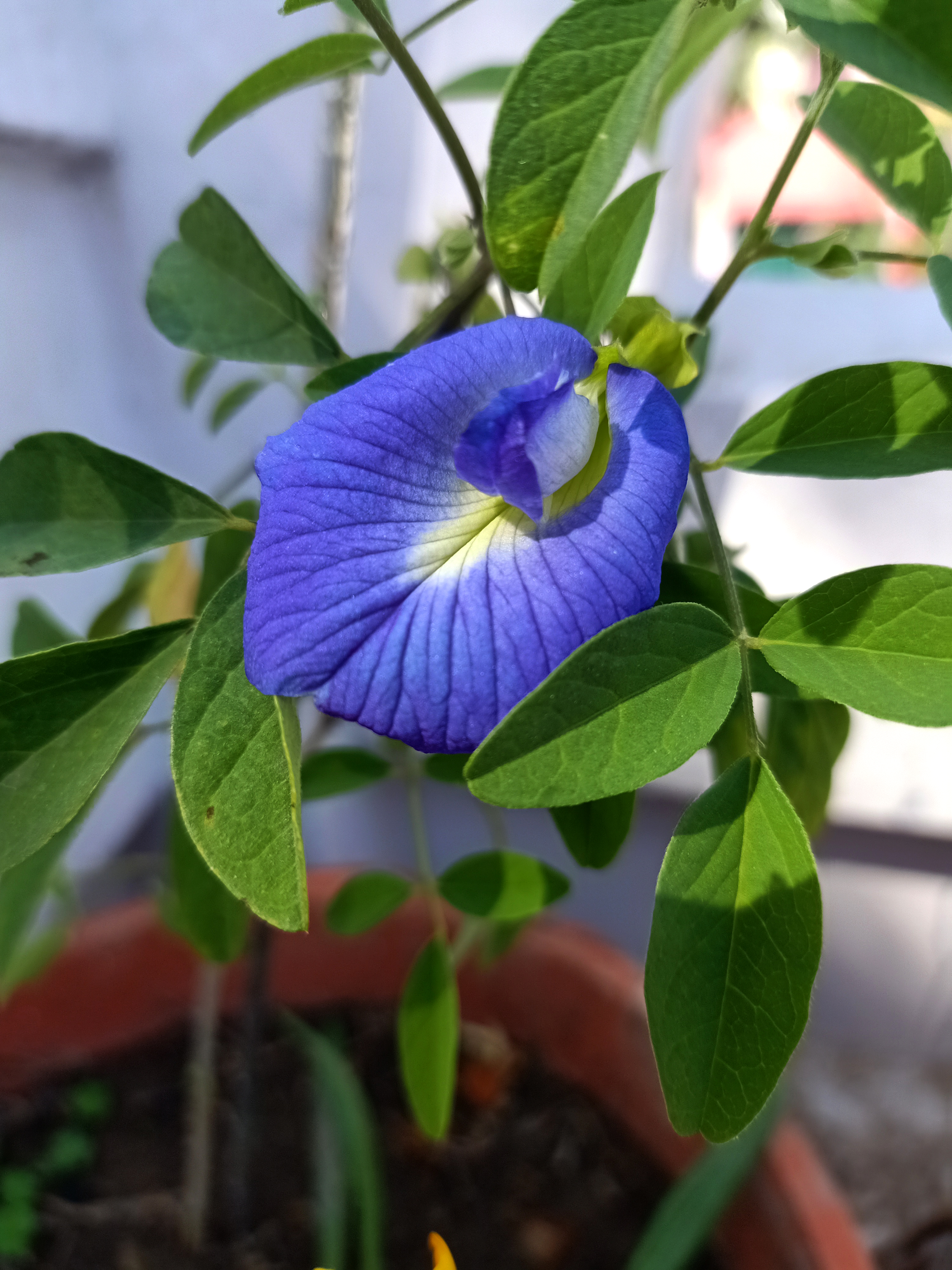
- Flower and foliage

Scientific classification
- Kingdom: Plantae
- Clade: Tracheophytes
- Clade: Angiosperms
- Clade: Eudicots
- Clade: Rosids
- Order: Fabales
- Family: Fabaceae
- Subfamily: Faboideae
- Genus: Clitoria
- Species: C. ternatea

Binomial name
- Clitoria ternatea L.

= Clitoria ternatea =

Species of legume

Clitoria ternatea, commonly known as Shankhupushpam (conch-shaped flower), Asian pigeonwings, bluebellvine, blue pea, butterfly pea, cordofan pea, or Darwin pea, is a plant in the family Fabaceae. It is named after the Indonesian island of Ternate. In Indian Ayurveda it is commonly known by the name aparajita.

== Description ==
It is a perennial herbaceous plant, with elliptic, obtuse leaves. It grows as a vine or creeper, doing well in moist, neutral soil. Its most striking feature is the color of its flowers, a vivid deep blue; solitary, with light yellow markings. They are about 4 cm (1 1/2 in) long by 3 cm (1 1/4 in) wide. Some varieties yield white flowers and pink.

The fruits are 5–7 cm (2–2 3/4 in) long, flat pods with six to ten seeds in each pod.

It is grown as an ornamental plant and as a revegetation species (e.g., in coal mines in Australia), requiring little care when cultivated. As a legume, its roots form a symbiotic association with soil bacteria known as rhizobia, which transform atmospheric N_{2} into a plant-usable form (a process called nitrogen fixation), therefore, this plant is also used to improve soil quality through the decomposition of nitrogen rich plant material.

=== Chemistry ===
Chemical compounds isolated from C. ternatea include various triterpenoids, flavonol glycosides, anthocyanins and steroids. Cyclic peptides known as cliotides have been isolated from the heat-stable fraction of C. ternatea extract. The blue colour of C. ternatea is a result of various anthocyanins, most importantly ternatins – polyacylated derivatives of delphinidin 3,3', 5'-triglucoside (Da-T). Clitorin is a flavonol glycoside found in C. ternatea and several other plants.

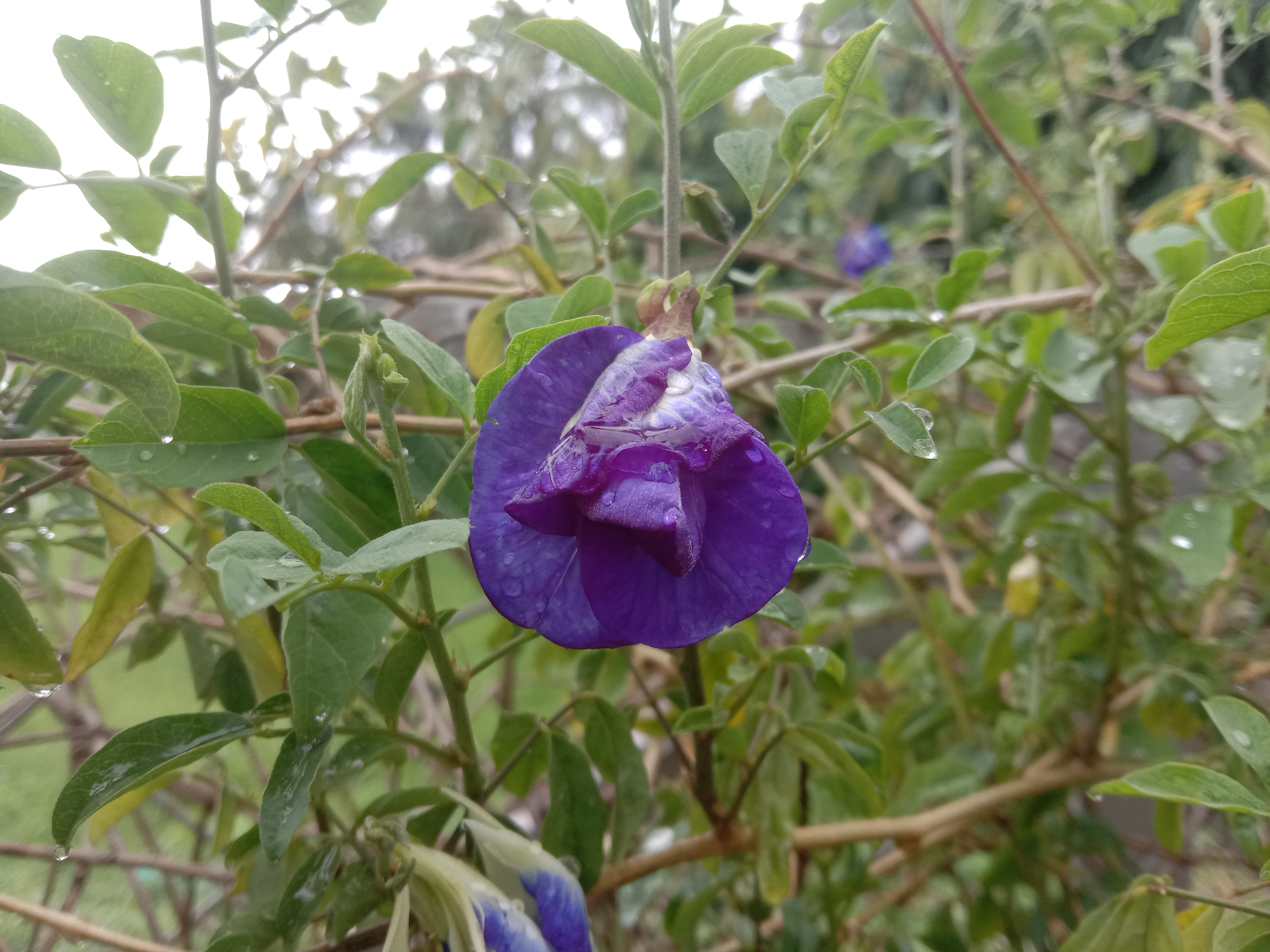
Blue flower

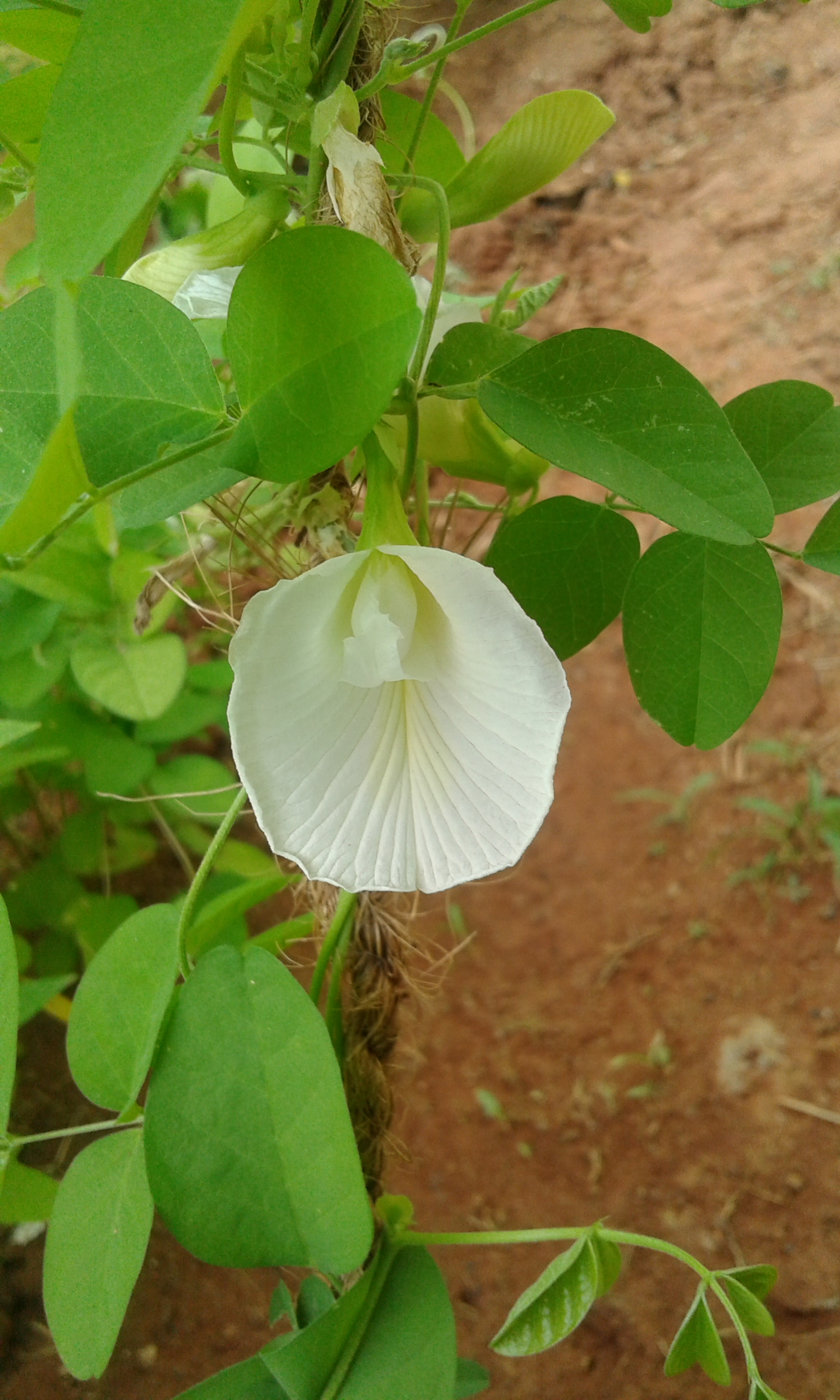
White flower

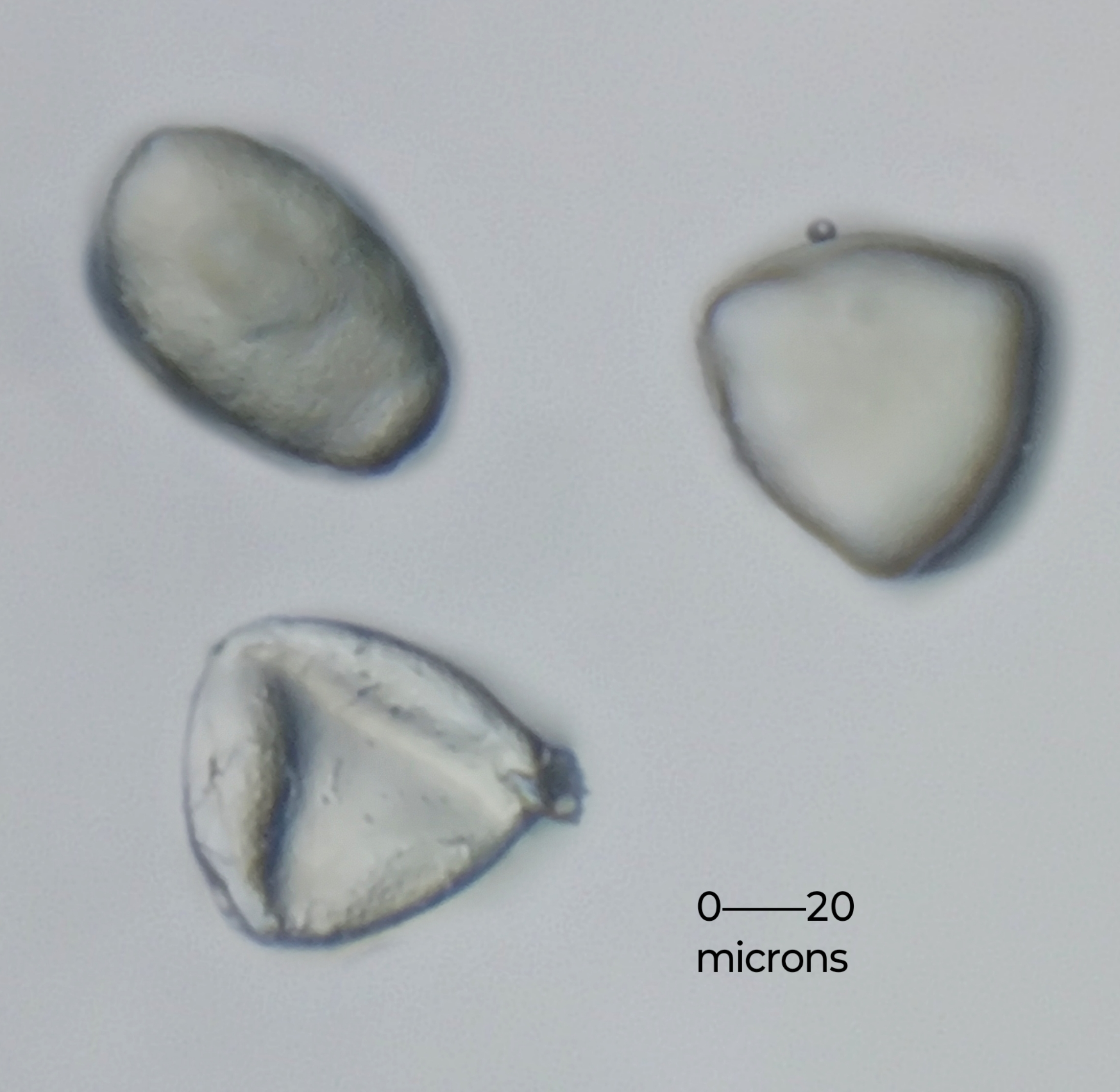
Pollen grains of Clitoria ternatea

== Etymology ==
The genus name Clitoria is derived from "clitoris", due to their blossoms' shape that resembles the shape of a human vulva. The first reference to the genus, which includes an illustration of the plant, was made in 1678 by Jakób Breyne, a Polish naturalist, who described it as Flos clitoridis ternatensibus, meaning 'Ternatean flower of the clitoris'. The species name is derived from the name of the island where botanist Carl Linnaeus's specimens originated: the Ternate Island, located in the northern part of the Maluku Islands.

== Distribution ==
This plant is native to equatorial Asia, including locations in South Asia and Southeast Asia but has also been introduced to Africa, Australia and the Americas.

== Cultivation ==
C. ternatea does not suffer from any severe pest or disease problems.

=== Pests ===
Rarely suffers from caterpillars, whiteflies, and spider mites.

=== Diseases ===
Suffers from anthracnose and bacterial soft rot. Rarely suffers from fungal root rots.

== Uses ==
The flower can be used to dye natural fibers and is used by traditional societies in Asia to do so.

=== Culinary ===
In Southeast Asia, the flower is used as a natural food colouring to colour glutinous rice and desserts like the Eurasian putugal as well as an ayurvedic medicine. In Kelantan, in the north-east of peninsular Malaysia, it is an important ingredient in nasi kerabu, giving it its characteristic bluish colour. It is also used to colour the Nyonya dish pulut tai tai.

The seeds are not edible. The pods are edible when young.

Butterfly pea flower tea is made from the ternatea flowers and dried lemongrass and changes color depending on what is added to the liquid, with lemon juice turning it purple. In Thailand and Vietnam, this butterfly blue pea flower tea is commonly mixed with honey and lemon to increase acidity and turn the beverage a pink-purple color, to produce for a drink usually served after dinner, or as a refreshment at hotels and spas. The drink is a typical local drink like chamomile tea is in other parts of the world. The tea is found in both hot and cold varieties.

The flowers have more recently been used in a color-changing gin and absinthe. Blue in the bottle, it turns pink when mixed with a carbonated mixer such as tonic water due to the change in pH. As organic colours are not permanent, this type of gin is recommended to be stored in a dark place to maintain the effect. It is, however, not an allowed food ingredient in the EU and at least one gin using it was recalled for that reason.

=== Traditional medicine ===
This plant has a long use in traditional Ayurveda. No clinical trials on humans have been conducted.

=== Insecticidal activity ===
Clitoria ternatea produces a class of cyclic peptides known as cyclotides, which exhibit potent insecticidal properties. These naturally occurring compounds are characterized by a stable cyclic cystine knot motif contributing to their resistance to enzymatic degradation and their bioactivity against insect pests. This activity has been utilized in the formulation of botanical insecticides based on plant-derived extracts. Extracts of C. ternatea have been commercialized for pest control and have been officially recognized as an active substance with a classification by the Insecticide Resistance Action Committee (IRAC). The insecticidal mode of action of cyclotides is believed to involve disruption of the epithelial membranes in the midgut of insect larvae following ingestion, leading to cell lysis and death. In addition to its toxic effects, Ct-extract has demonstrated repellent activity, contributing to pest management by deterring insect feeding and oviposition.

== Gallery ==
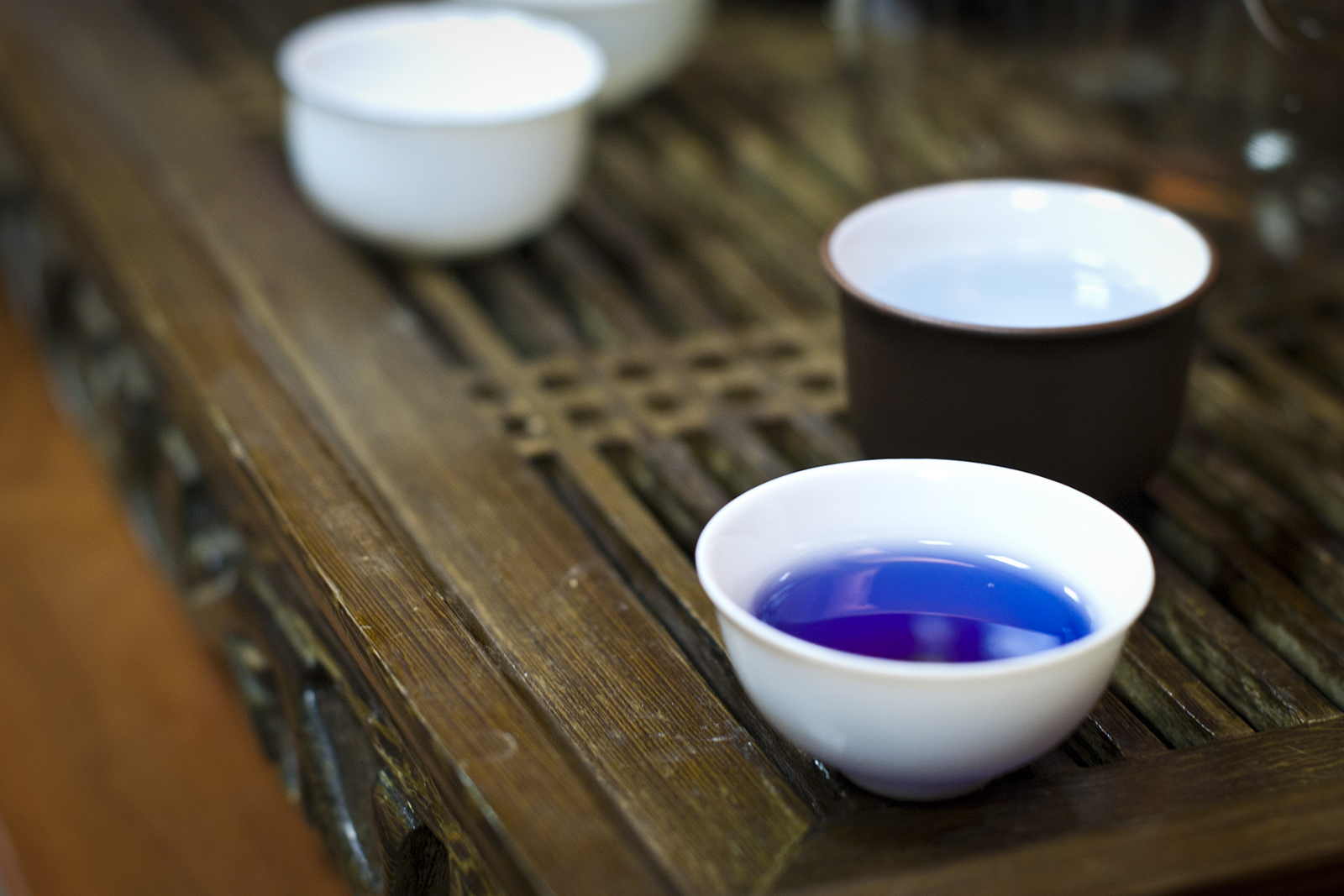
Butterfly pea flower tea is made from C ternatea flowers

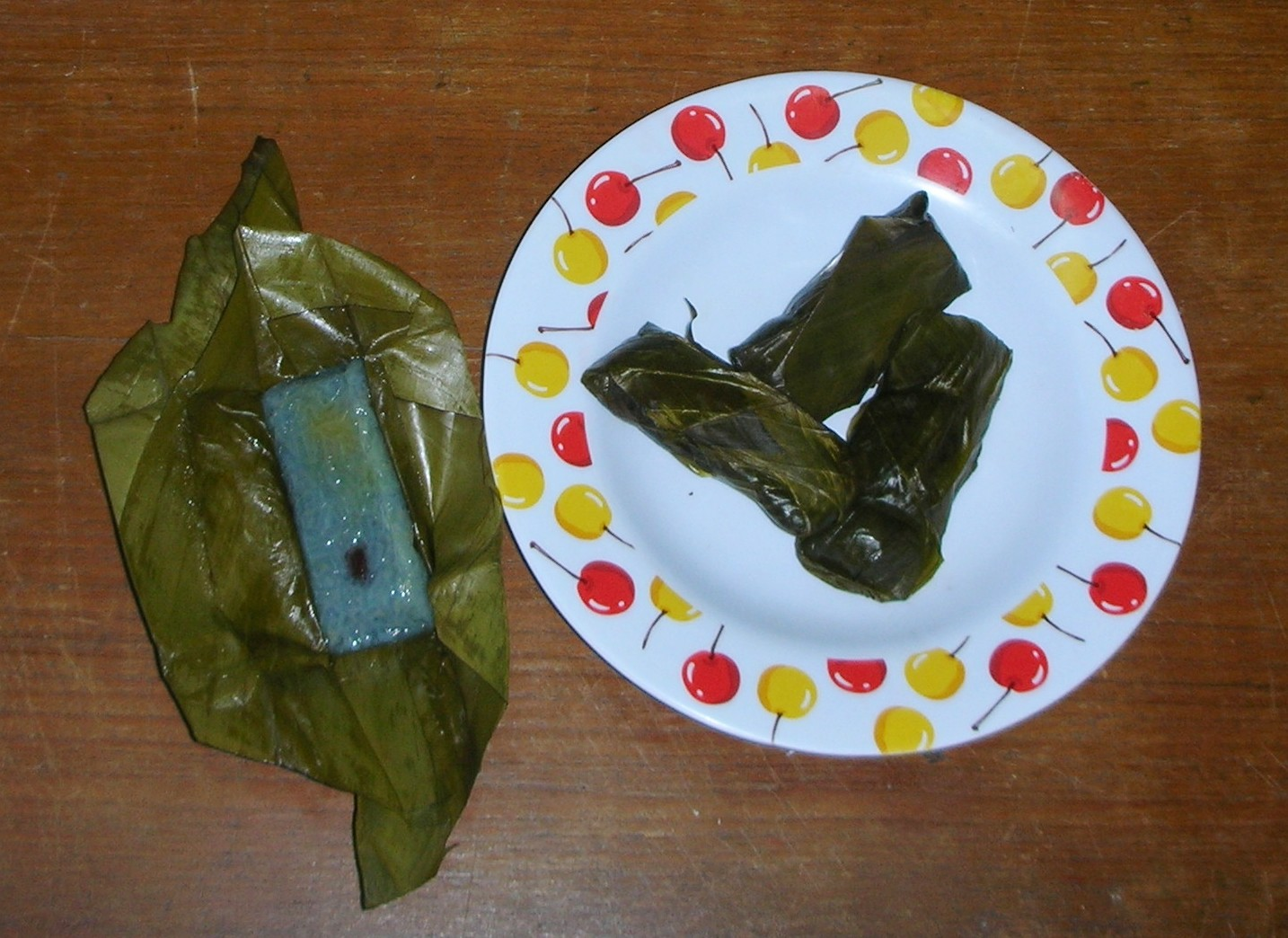
Thai khao tom sweet, colored blue with C. ternatea flowers

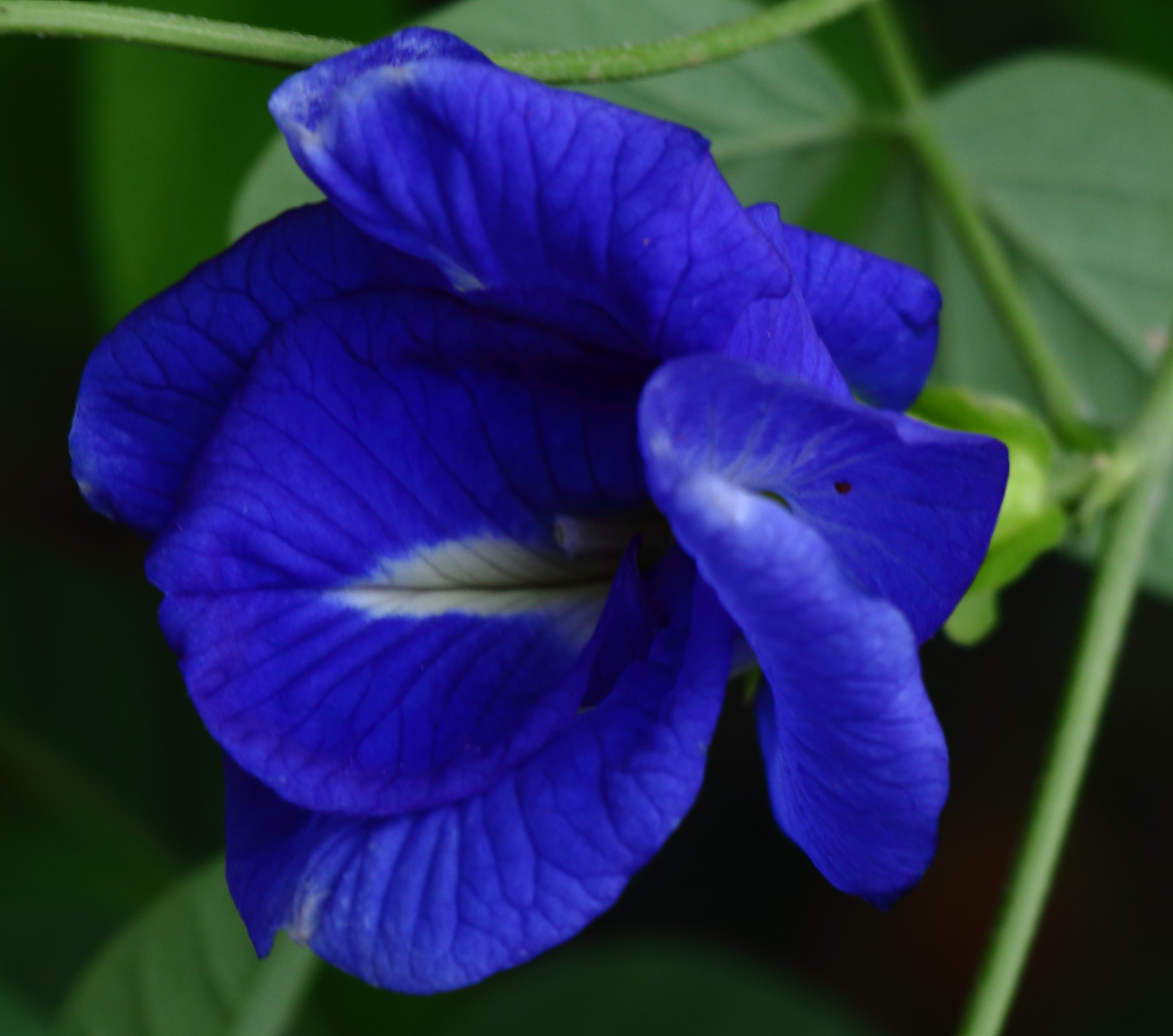
A less common "double-flowered" C. ternatea

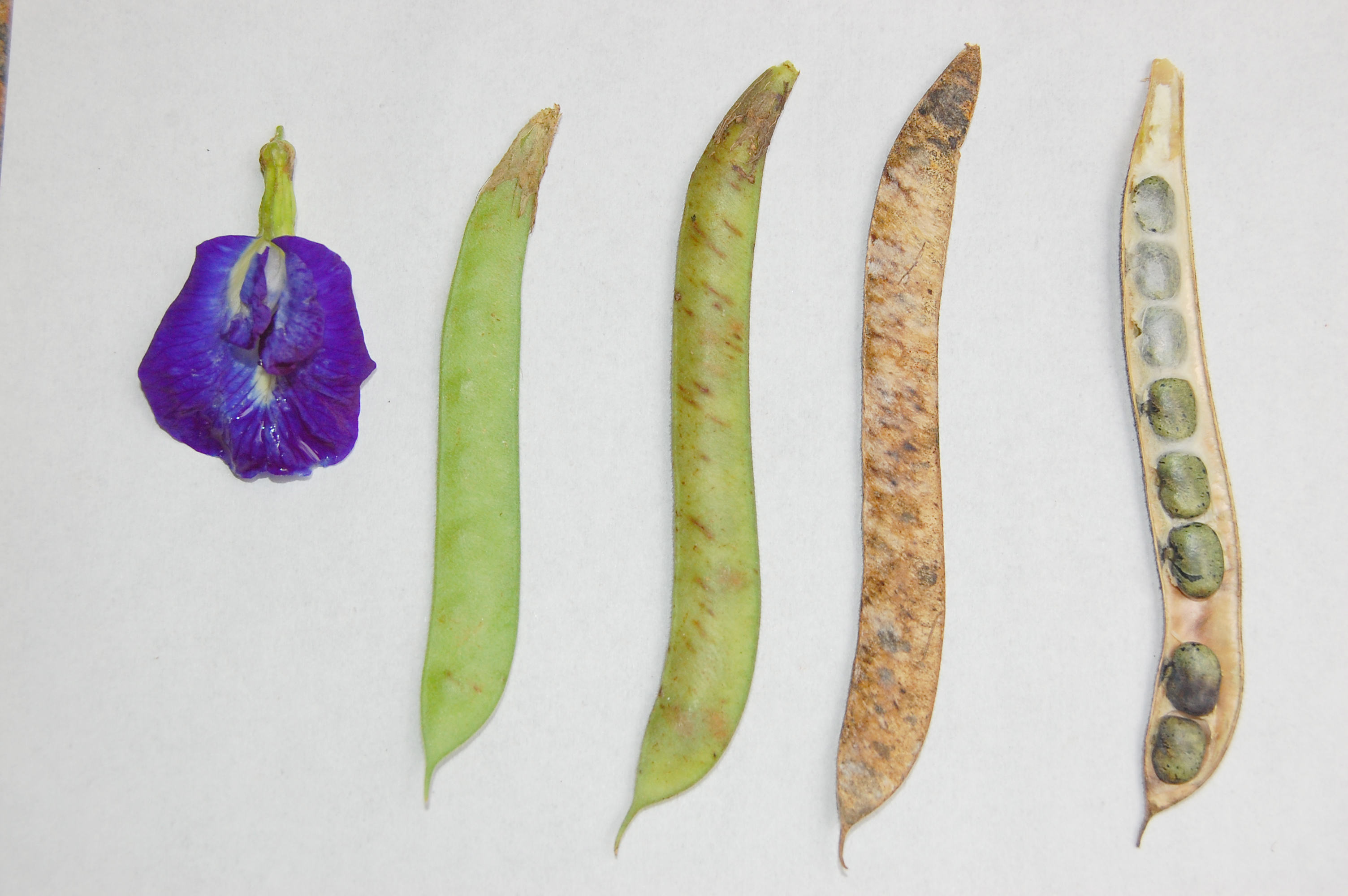
Flower and pods in different states of ripeness

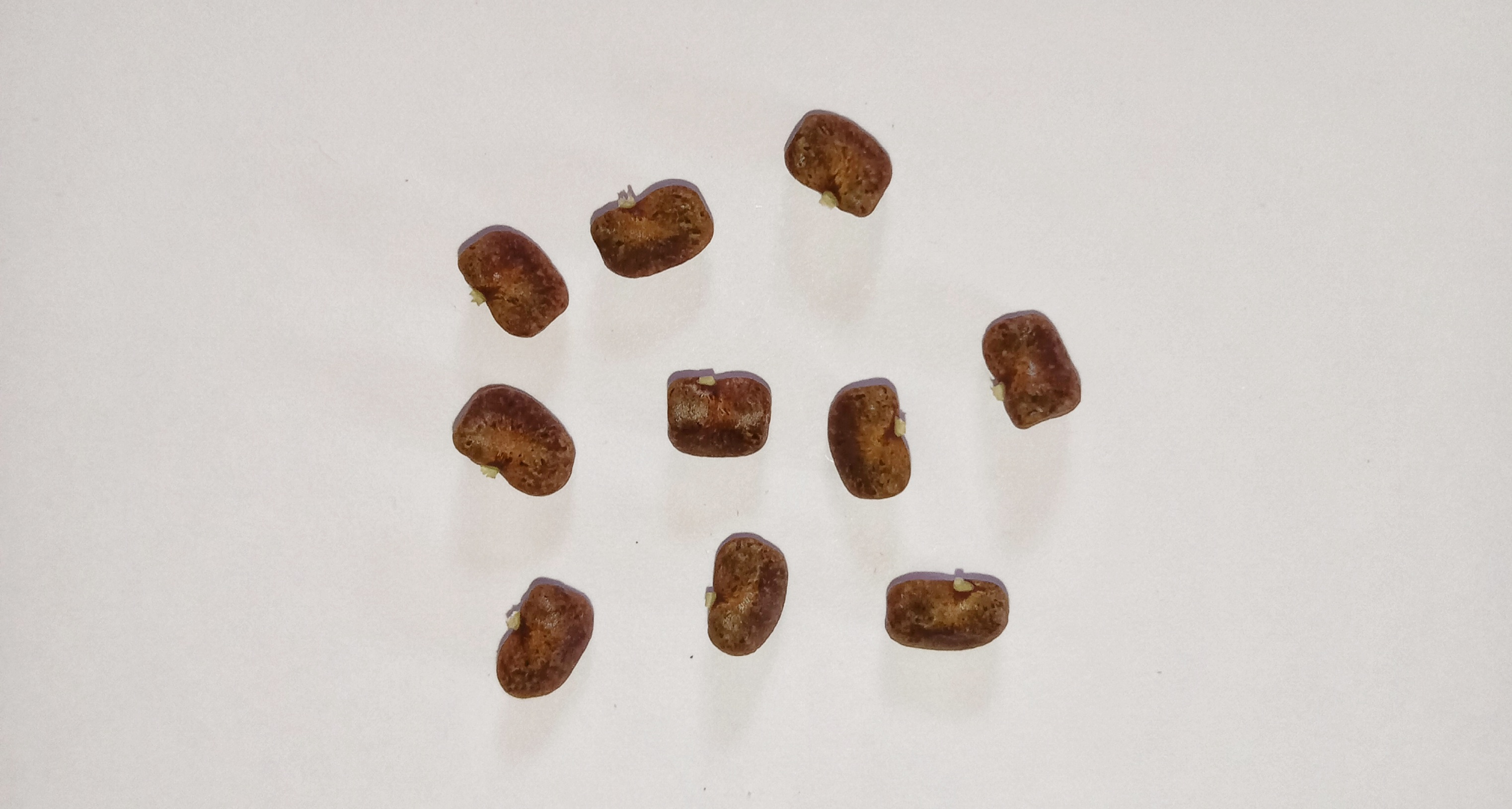
Seeds

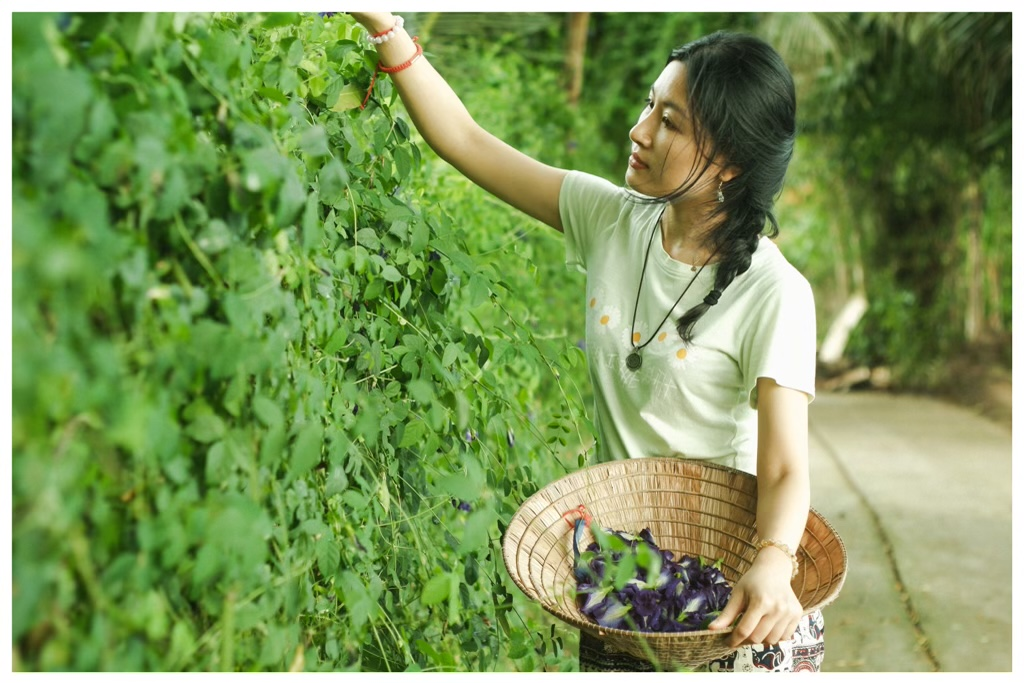
Vietnamese woman collecting butterfly pea flowers in her nón lá
