= Nasi kerabu =

Malaysian rice dish from Kelantan

Nasi kerabu ناسي کرابو
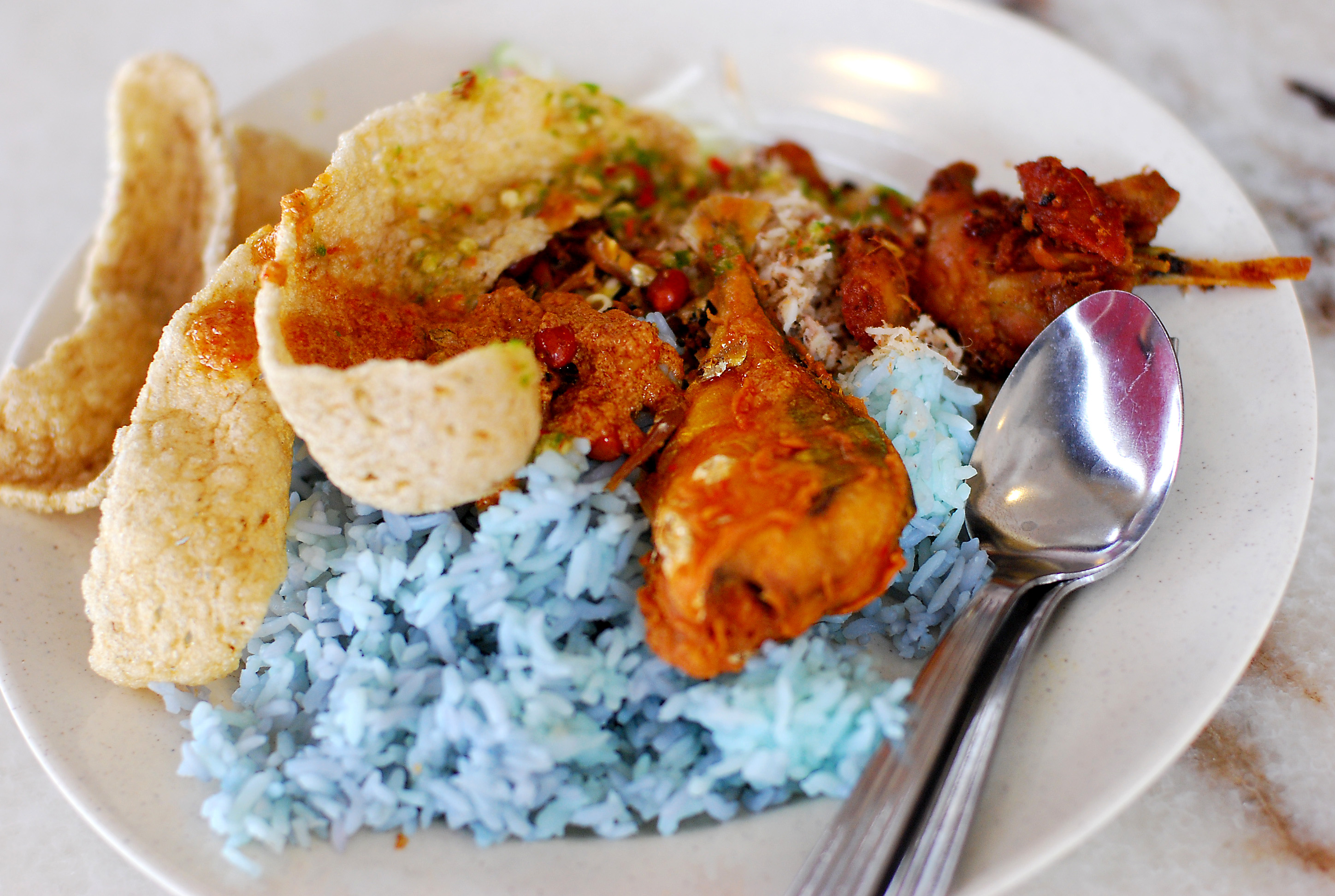
- Nasi kerabu served with various herbs, solok lada (fish-stuffed chili pepper), salted egg, fried fish, keropok and marinated chicken
- Course: Main course, usually for breakfast
- Associated cuisine: Malaysia (Kelantan, and Terengganu), Thailand (Pattani)
- Serving temperature: Room temperature
- Main ingredients: Rice cooked with Clitoria ternatea (butterfly-pea) flowers or turmeric, various herbs, coconut sambal (sambal nyior), budu

Nasi kerabu (Jawi: ناسي کرابو; Kelantanese: nasik kabu) is a type of nasi ulam in essence a Malay rice dish in which rice naturally coloured with butterfly pea flowers (Clitoria ternatea) served with sides of dried fish or fried chicken, stuffed peppers (solok lada), fried crackers and other herbs and greens; all of these side dishes often times mixed akin to a salad before eaten. The blue rice can also be plain white rice or rice cooked using turmeric.

Nasi kerabu is very popular in the east coast states of Peninsular Malaysia such as Kelantan and Terengganu, and now can be found throughout Malaysia as well as in Pattani also known by its Thai name ข้าวยำ khao yam (also anglicised as khao yum or calqued as rainbow rice salad).

== Origin and distribution ==
Boiled rice has been a key source of carbohydrates in the diet of the people of Malacca and Malay Archipelago since ancient times, and is an essential component of many local dishes. Most often, a portion of rice boiled in water, coconut milk or a mixture of both, is served with some kind of garnish. In Malaysian cuisine, as in many East Asian cuisines, rice is usually not a side dish, but the basis of the dish. The role of a side dish is performed by more or less significant additions to a serving rice. Accordingly, the names of such dishes usually contain the word "nasi" - "cooked rice" in Malay, (Note: Uncooked rice grains and the rice plant are referred to with other names in the Malay language.) as well as some qualifier referring to the way the rice is cooked, or referring to its side dish. One of these dishes is nasi kerabu, the name which literally means "rice with salad". Kerabu is one of the traditional types of salads made from vegetables and herbs in Malaysian cuisine.

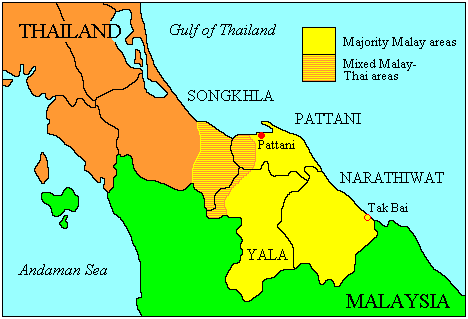
Southern provinces of Thailand: areas with Malay population highlighted in yellow

In terms of its composition, nasi kerabu is similar to a number of other Malaysian national dish, in particular, nasi ulam, in which a portion of rice is also supplemented with vegetable salad and some other side dishes, and even considered as a kind of the latter. However, the fundamental value of nasi kerabu is the bright colour of rice is achieved through the use of natural food colouring - flowers of the trifoliate clitoria (Clitoria ternatea), which is native to Southeast Asia.

Nasi kerabu is a traditional dish of the northeastern coast of the Malay Peninsula, primarily in the Malaysian states of Kelantan and Terengganu, from where it spread to the other regions of the country by the beginning of the 21st century, as well as to neighbouring Singapore. This dish is also very popular in the adjacent regions of southern Thailand, populated mainly by Malays, among whom there are separatist sentiments. Due to the latter circumstance, nasi kerabu is often perceived in this area not only as the most important culinary speciality, but also as one of the informal symbols of Malay ethnic identity and connection with similar peoples in Malaysia.

== Preparation and varieties ==
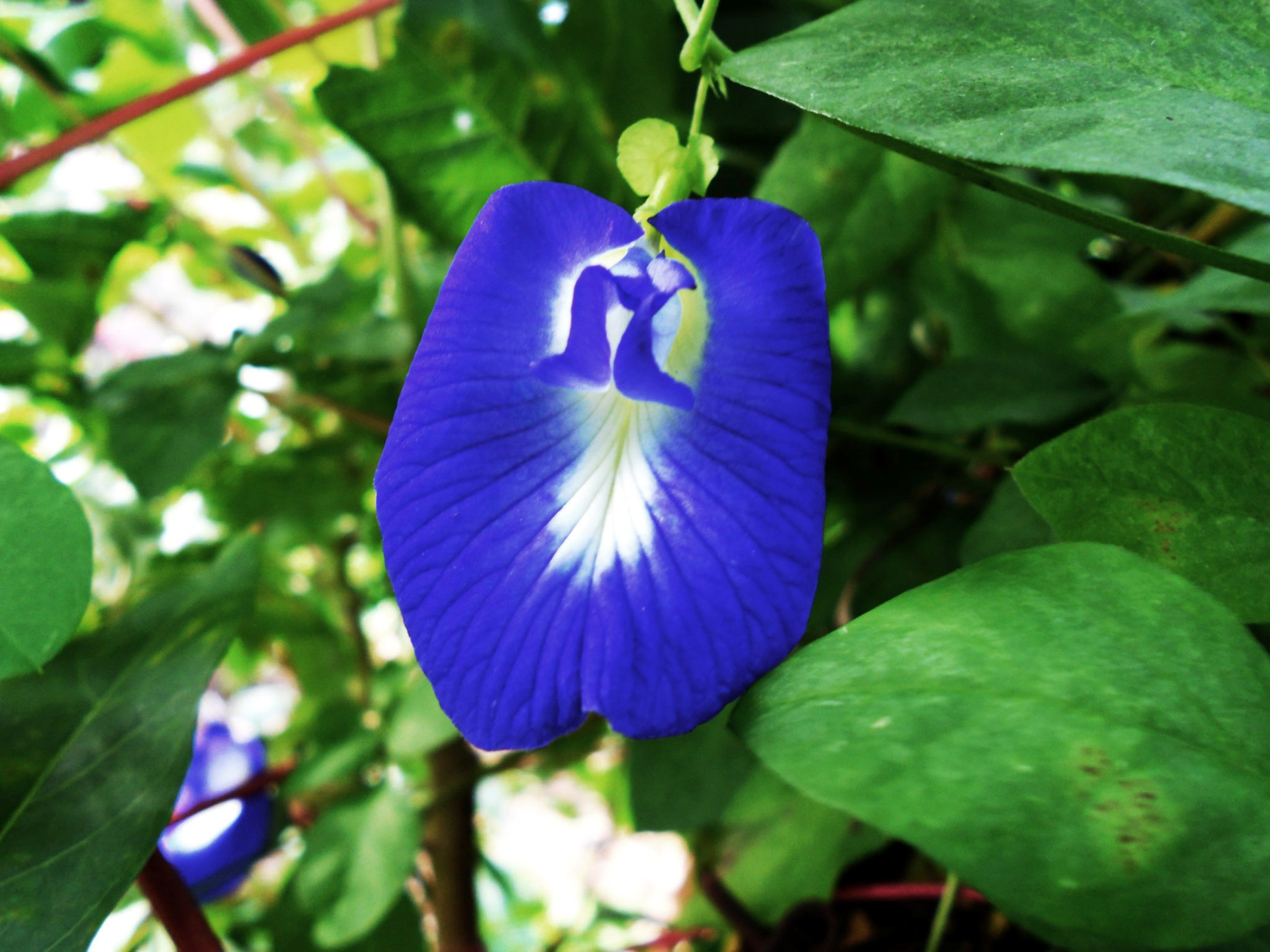
Clitoria ternatea flower close-up

Nasi kerabu consists of several components: boiled rice, vegetable salad and at least one more, and more often several additions. And if dyed rice is an essential part of this dish, then the salad and to an even greater extent, additional ingredients can vary quite widely, which ultimately creates a huge variety of varieties of nasi kerabu.

In water intended for boiling rice, several flowers of Clitoria ternatea, fresh or dried, are soaked for several minutes, as a result of which it acquires a very intense blue colour with a hint of indigo. In addition, a certain set of spices is added to the water, which usually consists of finely chopped stems of lemon grass, leaves of Kaffir lime and pandan plant, often - syzygium multiflora, ginger, and also palm sugar. Sometimes coconut milk is added to the water.

Kerabu is a vegetable salad that is part of the dish, usually a mixture of no more than three or four ingredients: raw, soaked and, less often boiled. Most often, cucumbers, lettuce, cowpea, green beans, water spinach, bok choy, onions or green onions, cabbage, paprika, chili peppers, knotweed, bamboo sprouts or sprouted mungs are used for its preparation. The portion of the vegetable mixture added to the dish is usually no more than half the volume of a serving rice.

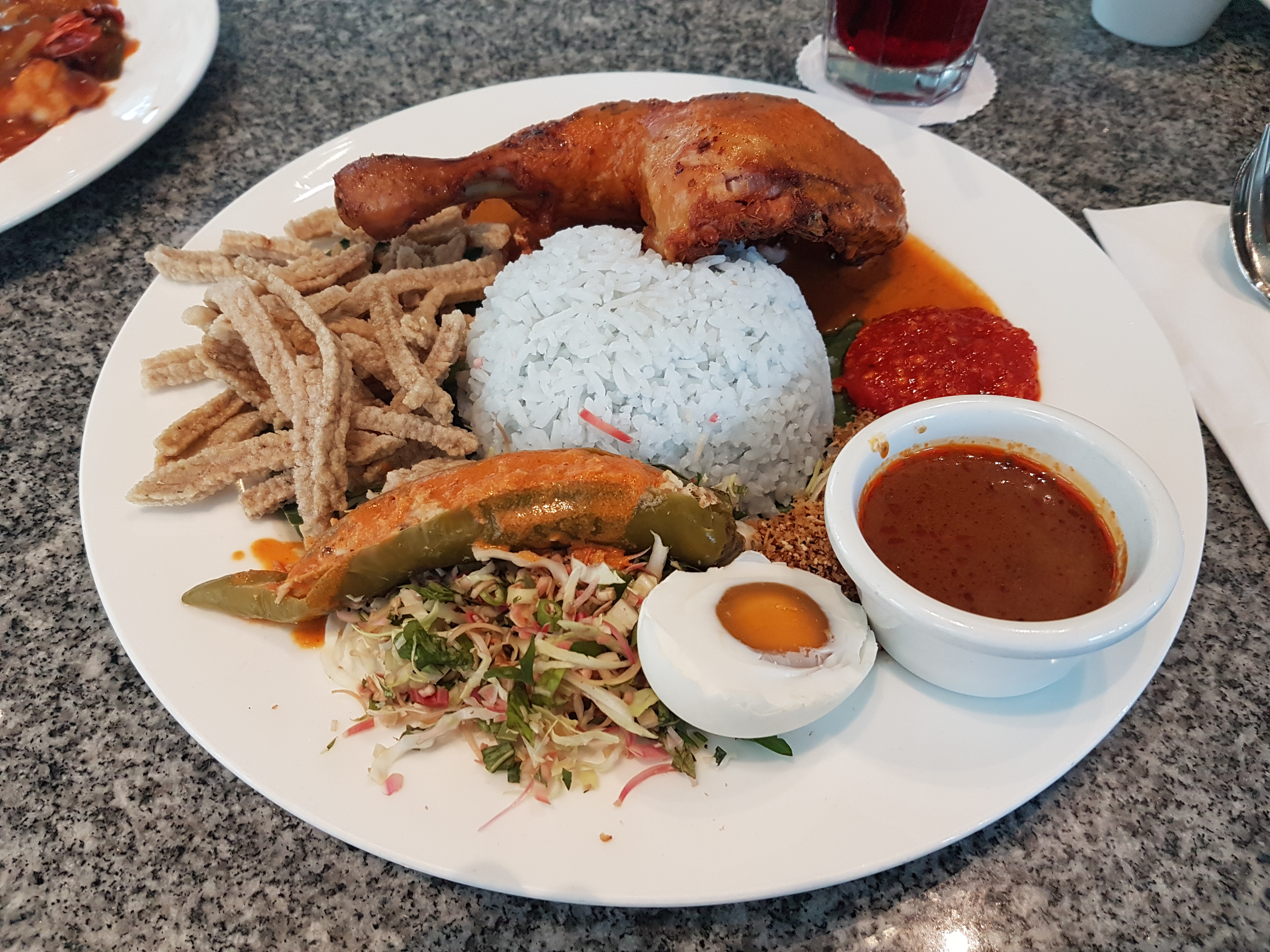
Nasi kerabu with chicken leg, solok lada, telur masin, keropok and sambal

In addition to the vegetable mixture, some animal product is almost always added to Nasi kerabu: chicken, fish, seafood or meat. This part of the dish can be prepared in various ways: most often it is fried or stewed using some kind of sauces.

Along with these products, or instead of rice, this dish often uses such Malaysian cuisine specialties such as solok lada - fried capsicum stuffed with grated flesh of a young coconut - and telur masin - duck or much more rarely, a chicken egg, aged in a special brine with spices. Usually, one or two stuffed peppers and half salted egg are served per serving Nasi kerabu: the latter, which has a slightly gelatinous consistency, is often placed on a plate right in the shell. In addition, rice and other components of the dish are often sprinkled with keropok.

== Serving ==
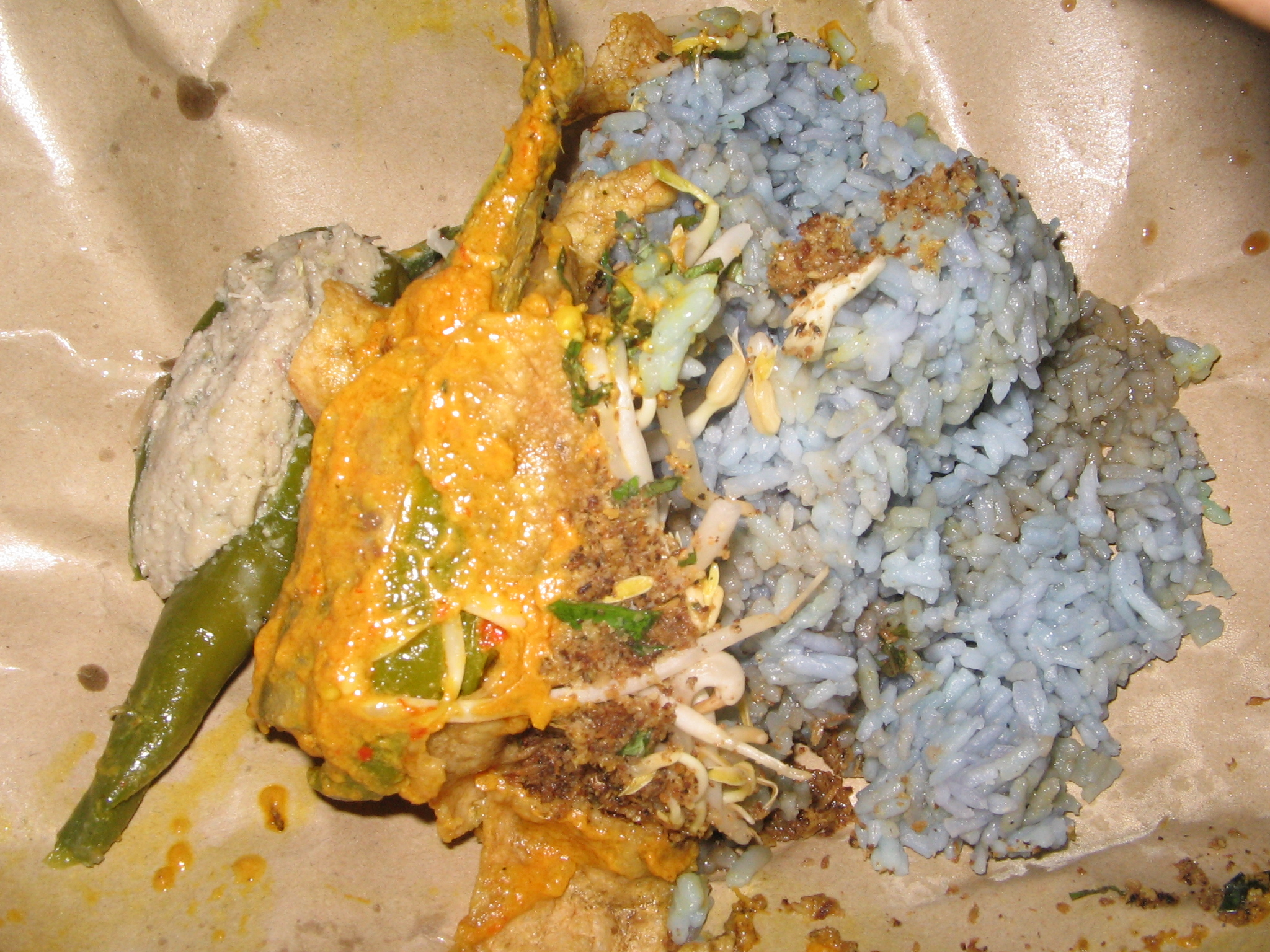
Fast-food portion of nasi kerabu in paper

All components of Nasi kerabu are laid out on one flat plate. A pile of rice is usually the central part of the "composition", but may also be located on the edge of the plate. Lettuce and other additives are laid out to the next rice, or in whole or in part - on top of it. This dish, like many other traditional Malaysian dishes, is often served with sambal. Sometimes - in particular, at a festive or restaurant serving - a nasi kerabu dish is decorated with fresh flowers of Clitoria ternatea.

Nasi kerabu is served hot or at room temperature. In West Malaysia, this dish is very popular in both home and street cuisine: it is prepared both in modern style restaurants and in many traditional taverns. A fast food, "portable" version of this dish can be purchased at markets or street vendors, which can be eaten on the go or taken as a food supply: a small portion of blue rice with a usually rather modest side dish is wrapped in paper or newspaper.

== See also ==
- List of Malay dishes
- Nasi ulam
- Nasi dagang
- Nasi lemak

== Bibliography ==
- Pogadaev VA, ed. (2012). Malay world (Brunei, Indonesia, Malaysia, Singapore). Linguistic and Cultural Dictionary. Vol. M. Eastern book. ISBN 978-5-7873-0658-3.
- Dorofeeva TV, Kukushkina ES, Pogadaev VA (2013). Large Malay-Russian Dictionary. Vol. M.
- Azlee, Zan [in Malay] (2011). Operation Nasi Kerabu: Finding Patani in a Reward. Petaling Jaya, Selangor Darul Ehsan: ZI Publications. ISBN 9789675266195.
- Ismail Ahmad (2019). Halal Home Cooking: Recipes from Malaysia 's Kampungs. Singapore: Marshall Cavendish International Asia. ISBN 9789814868716.
- Saw, Betty (2014). Best of Malaysian Cooking. Singapore: Marshall Cavendish International Asia. ISBN 9789814561983.
- Abu Khairi (2004). Santapan Malaysia terkini. Shah Alam: Cerdik Publications Sdn Bhd. ISBN 9789834129613.
