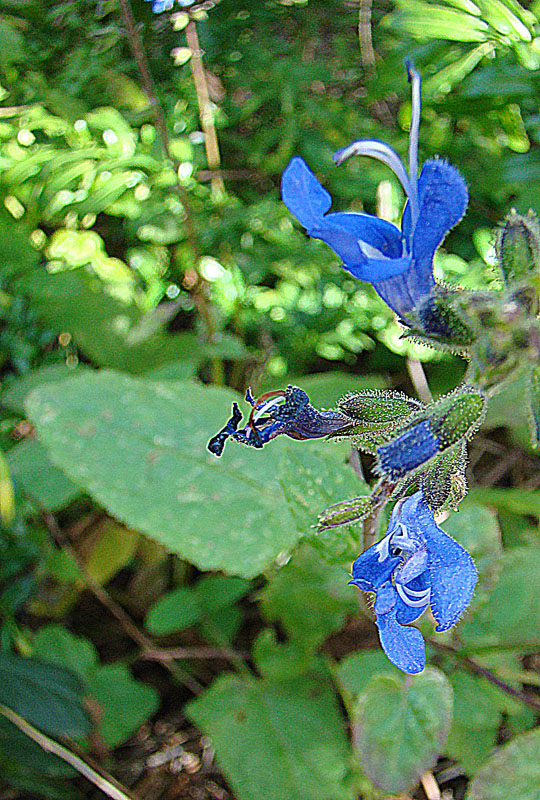

Scientific classification
- Kingdom: Plantae
- Clade: Tracheophytes
- Clade: Angiosperms
- Clade: Eudicots
- Clade: Asterids
- Order: Lamiales
- Family: Lamiaceae
- Genus: Salvia
- Species: S. scutellarioides

Binomial name
- Salvia scutellarioides Kunth

= Salvia scutellarioides =

Species of plant

Salvia scutellarioides is an evergreen perennial native to the Andes Mountains in Ecuador, Colombia, and Peru, growing at elevations from 3,300 to 10,000 feet in mild climates where there is year-round moisture. Even though it was described by Carl Sigismund Kunth in 1817, as of 2002 it was still rarely seen in horticulture. The specific epithet is due to its similarity to Scutellaria, a genus in the mint family.

Salvia scutellarioides is evergreen and prostrate, with graceful trailing stems that reach 1.5 feet in length. The forest-green deltoid leaves generously cover the plant, varying in length but averaging about 3.5 inches long and wide. The back surface of the leaf has raised veins, and both surfaces are lightly covered with hairs. Though flowering is sparse, the striking 0.5 inch flowers are a brilliant blue, with a tiny hairy green calyx. Flowering begins in late summer and continues sporadically through late autumn. The inflorescences are 6–8 inches long, with the flowers growing opposite.
