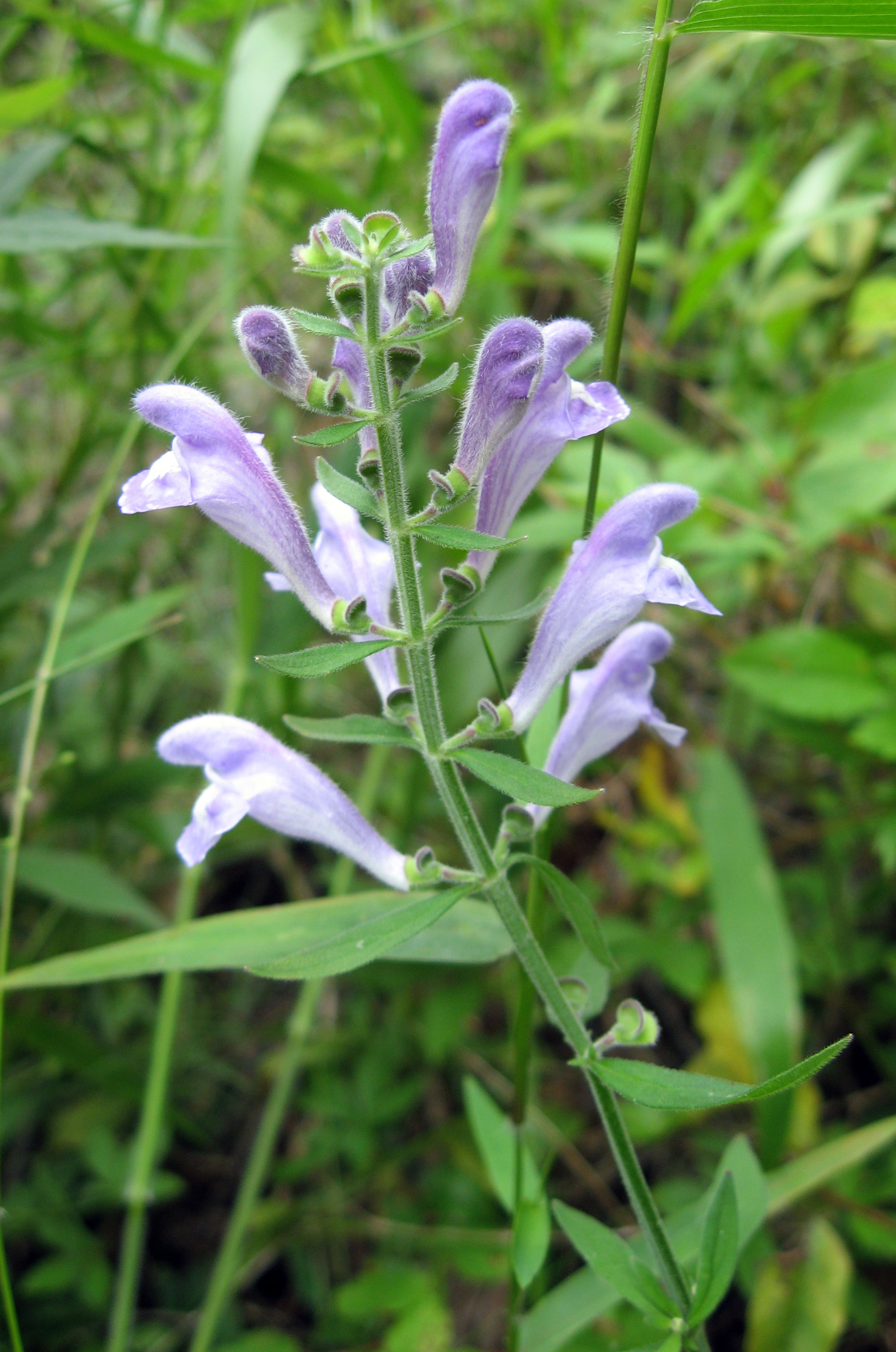

Scientific classification
- Kingdom: Plantae
- Clade: Embryophytes
- Clade: Tracheophytes
- Clade: Spermatophytes
- Clade: Angiosperms
- Clade: Eudicots
- Clade: Asterids
- Order: Lamiales
- Family: Lamiaceae
- Genus: Scutellaria
- Species: S. integrifolia

Binomial name
- Scutellaria integrifolia L.

= Scutellaria integrifolia =

Species of flowering plant

Scutellaria integrifolia, commonly called helmet flower or helmet skullcap, is a flowering plant in the mint family. It is native to the eastern United States where it is found in openings in mesic, acidic soil. It likely requires disturbance in the form of fire to maintain its appropriate habitat.

Scutellaria integrifolia is identifiable by its narrow, usually entire leaves and densely pubescent stem. It produces a raceme of large blue-purple flowers in late spring through summer.

== Description ==
This species can reach a height between 1.5 and 8 decimeters (approximately 6 to 31.5 inches). Its leaves range in size, with lower leaves being between 0.7 and 3.5 centimeters in length and upper leaves reaching 2.5 to 6 centimeters in length. When in bloom, petals reach a length of 1.3 to 2.5 centimeters.

== Habitat ==
Within the United States' Coastal Plain region, individuals occur within habitats such as pine savannas, mixed woodlands, along creek banks, and within oak-hickory woods. It is often observed at sites that had previously been burned.

It has occurred at sites with soil types including loamy soil, sandy loam, loamy clay, and peaty soils.

== Ecology ==
Scutellaria integrifolia is insect pollinated and is recorded to have been visited in northern Florida by Megachile georgica.
