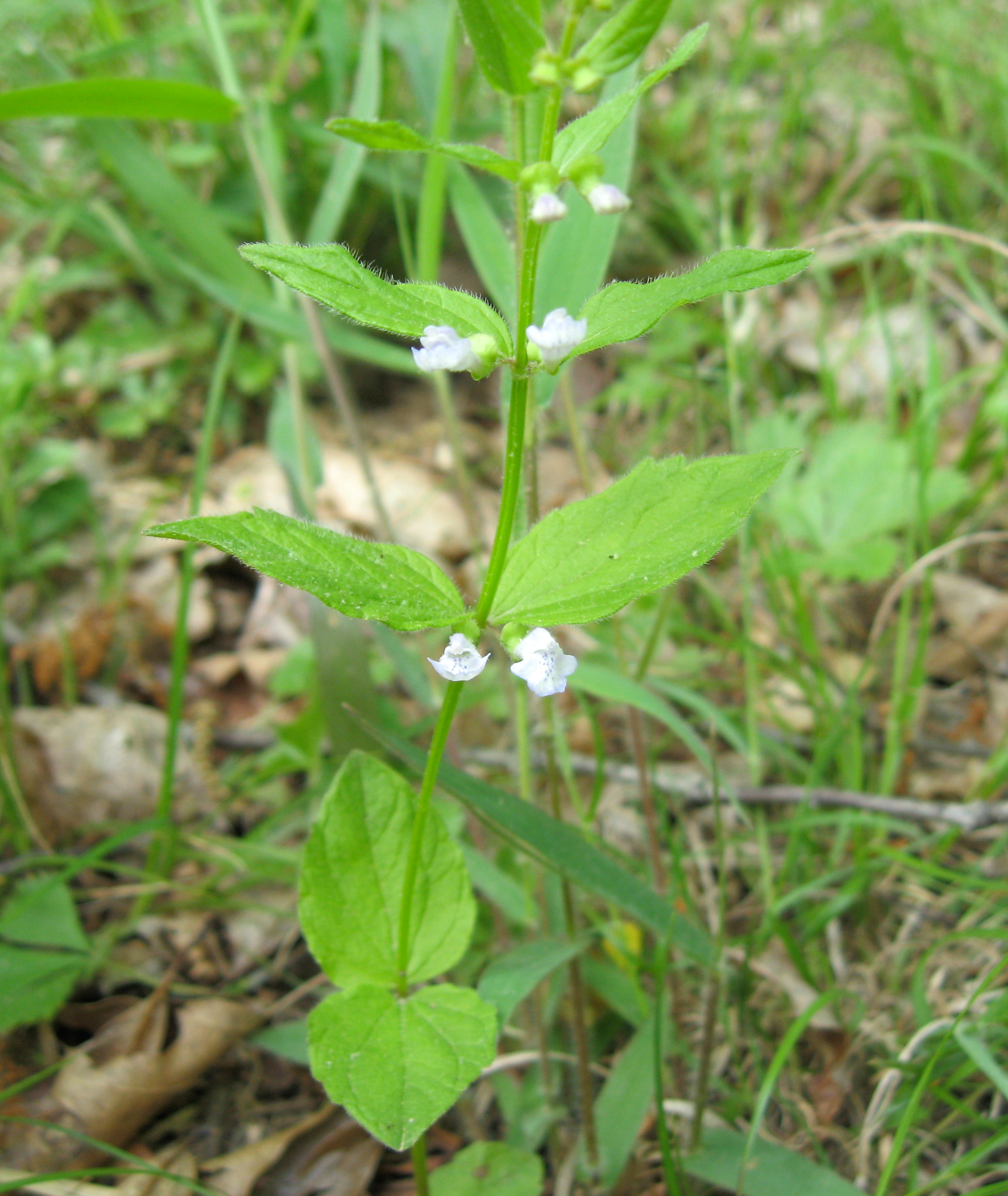

Scientific classification
- Kingdom: Plantae
- Clade: Tracheophytes
- Clade: Angiosperms
- Clade: Eudicots
- Clade: Asterids
- Order: Lamiales
- Family: Lamiaceae
- Genus: Scutellaria
- Species: S. nervosa

Binomial name
- Scutellaria nervosa Pursh

= Scutellaria nervosa =

Species of flowering plant

Scutellaria nervosa, commonly known as the veiny skullcap, is a flowering plant in the mint family. It is native to the eastern United States where it is primarily found in the Ohio River drainage of the Midwest and Upper South. It is primarily found in alluvial, often calcareous forests.

It produces tubular white flowers with purple dots in late spring.
