= Scutellaria ocmulgee =

Scientific classification
- Kingdom: Plantae
- Clade: Tracheophytes
- Clade: Angiosperms
- Clade: Eudicots
- Clade: Asterids
- Order: Lamiales
- Family: Lamiaceae
- Genus: Scutellaria
- Species: S. ocmulgee

Binomial name
- Scutellaria ocmulgee Small

Species of herbaceous perennial plant

Scutellaria ocmulgee, commonly known as Ocmulgee skullcap, is a species of herbaceous perennial plant found only in the Savannah River (South Carolina and Georgia) and the Ocmulgee River (Georgia) watersheds.

Ocmulgee skullcap was first described as a new species in 1898 based on a specimen collected along the Ocmulgee River in Bibb County, Georgia.
