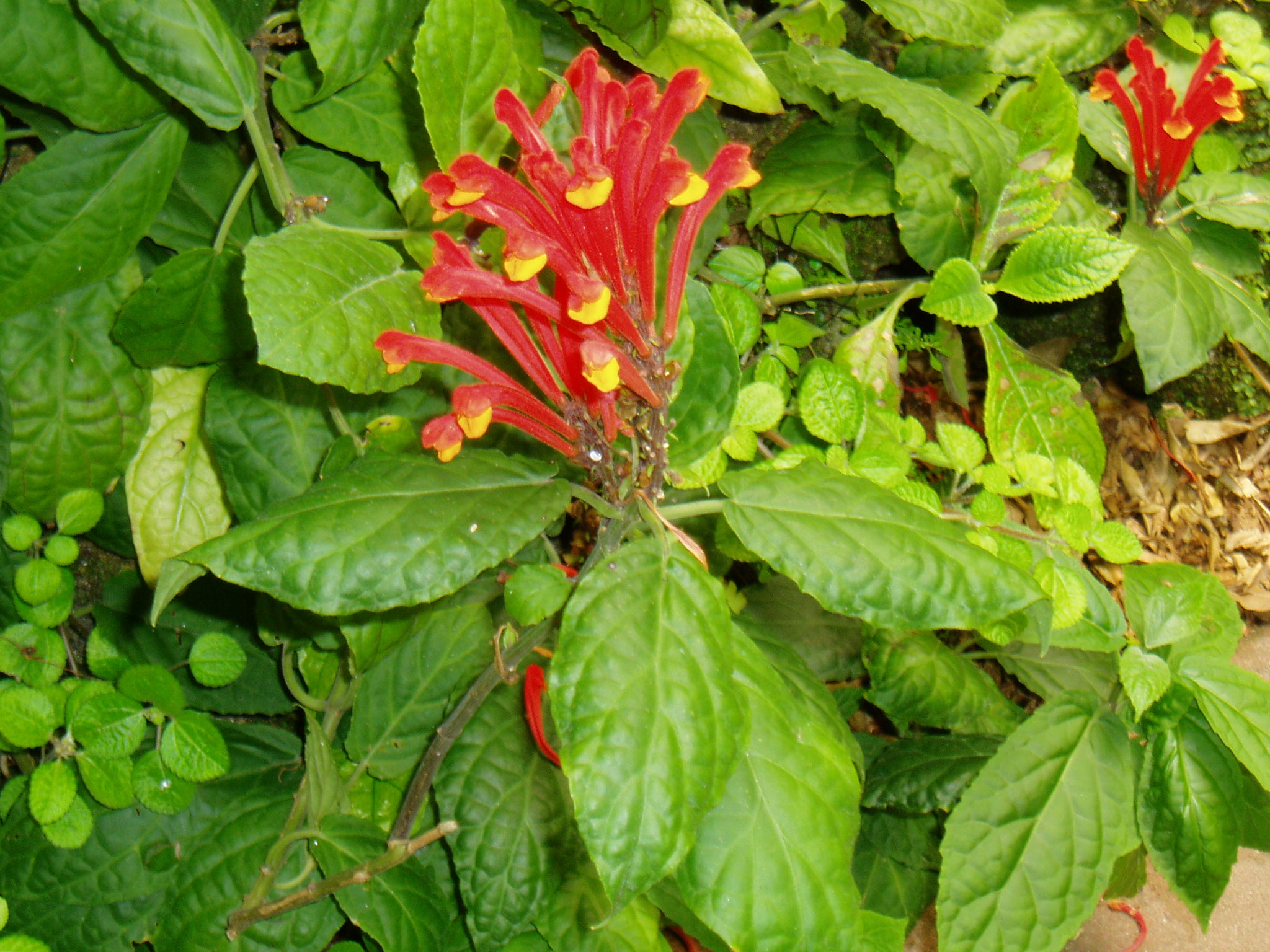

Scientific classification
- Kingdom: Plantae
- Clade: Tracheophytes
- Clade: Angiosperms
- Clade: Eudicots
- Clade: Asterids
- Order: Lamiales
- Family: Lamiaceae
- Genus: Scutellaria
- Species: S. costaricana

Binomial name
- Scutellaria costaricana H.Wendl.

= Scutellaria costaricana =

Species of flowering plant

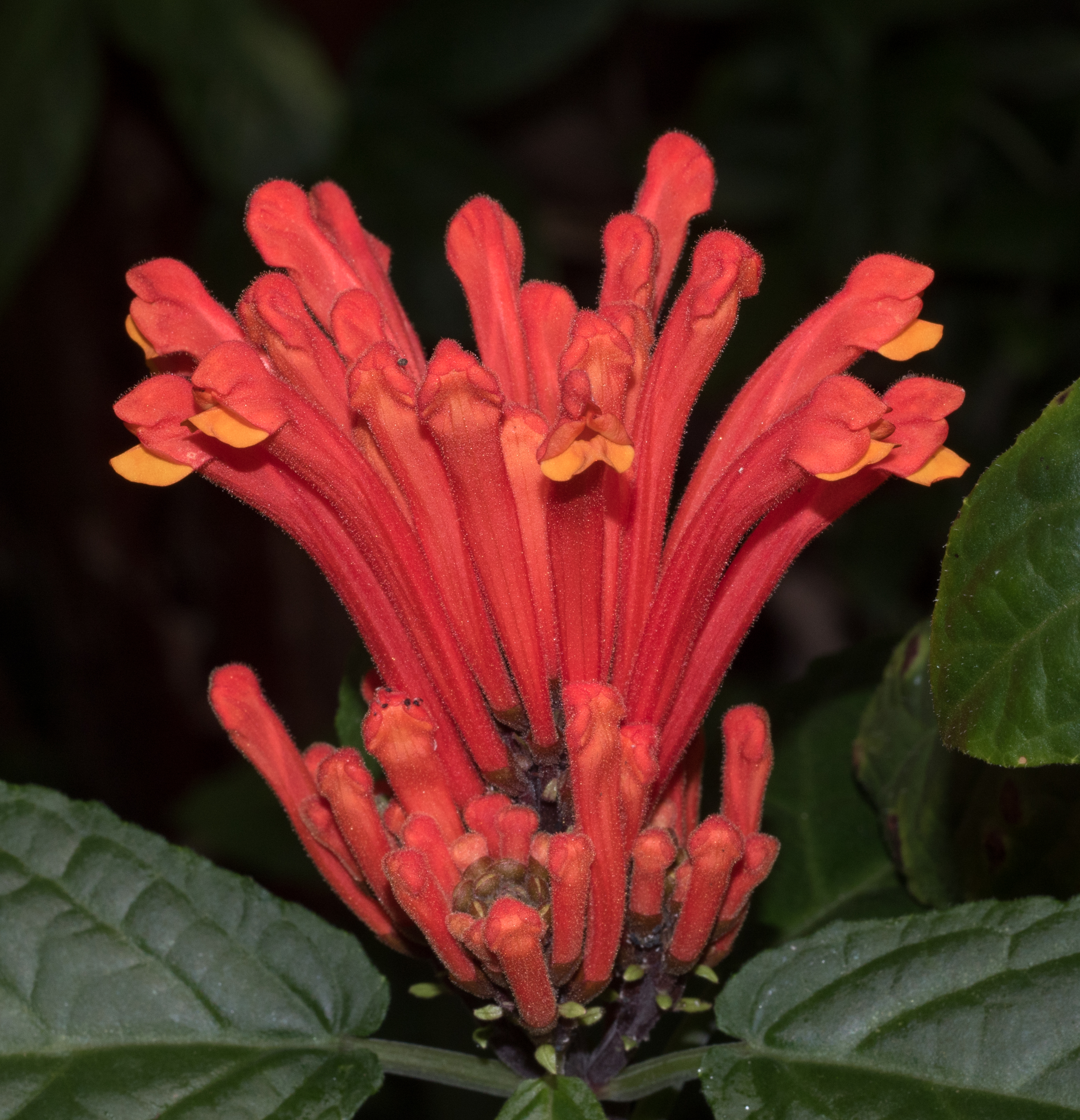
Scarlet skullcap flowers

Scutellaria costaricana is a species of flowering plant in the mint family, Lamiaceae, that is native to Costa Rica and Panama. It is commonly known scarlet skullcap or Costa Rican skullcap and is a popular tropical houseplant.
