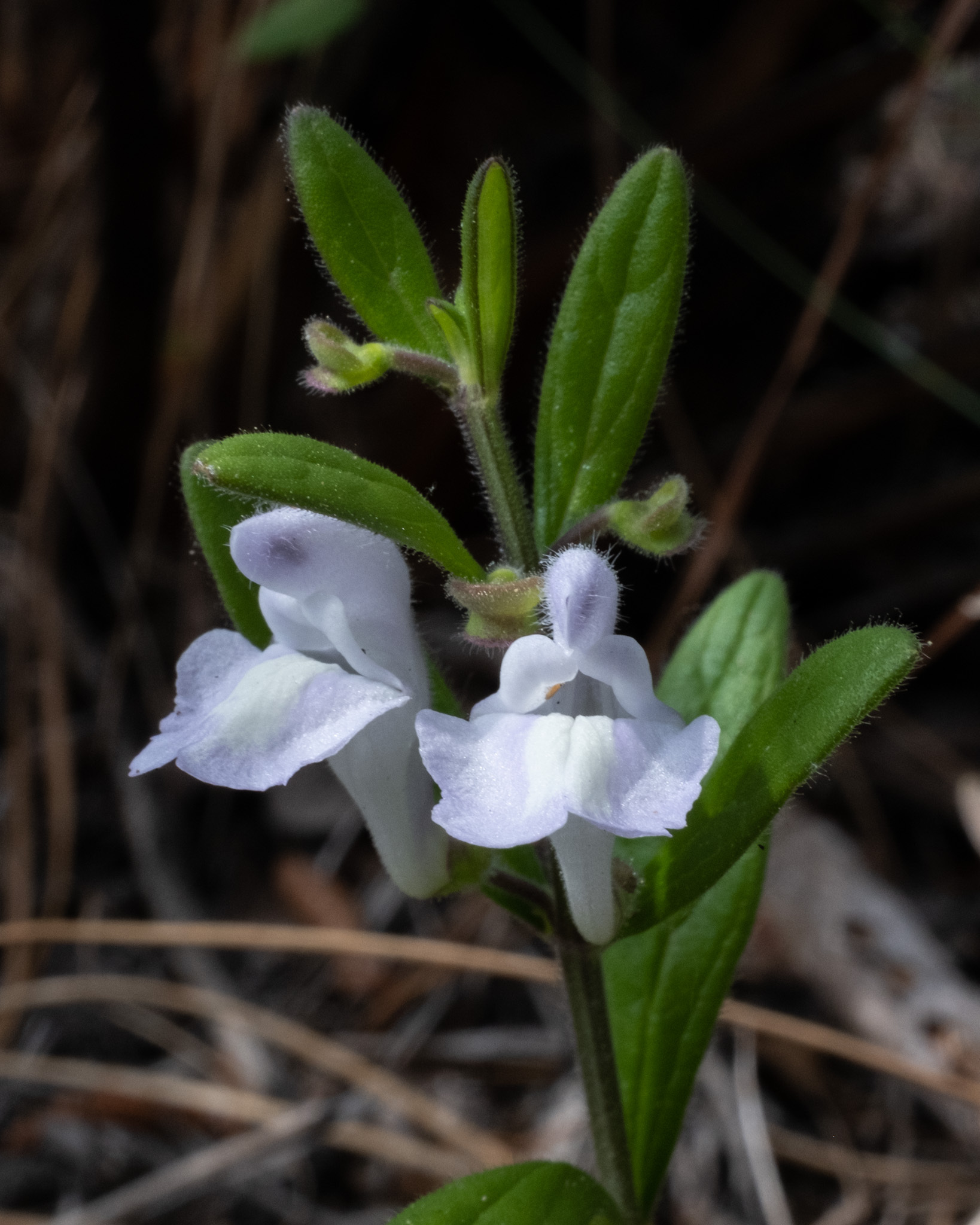

Conservation status
- Vulnerable (NatureServe)

Scientific classification
- Kingdom: Plantae
- Clade: Embryophytes
- Clade: Tracheophytes
- Clade: Angiosperms
- Clade: Eudicots
- Clade: Asterids
- Order: Lamiales
- Family: Lamiaceae
- Genus: Scutellaria
- Species: S. multiglandulosa

Binomial name
- Scutellaria multiglandulosa (Kearney) Small ex Harper

= Scutellaria multiglandulosa =

Species of flowering plant

Scutellaria multiglandulosa is a flowering plant in the genus Scutellaria and family Lamiaceae. It grows in parts of the Southeastern United States. It is sometimes referred to by the common name Small's skullcap.

== Description ==
S. multiglandulosa can reach a height between 1.5 and 8 decimeters (approximately 5.9 to 31.5 inches). The lowest-sitting leaves are triangular-ovate in shape and have a length of 0.7 to 3.5 centimeters. The higher leaves are range in shape from lanceolate to narrowly elliptic, with a length ranging between 2.5 and 6 centimeters.

When flowers are produced (between April and May) they are blue to violet in color. Petals are 1.3 to 2.5 centimeters in length.

== Habitat ==
Within the United States' Coastal Plain region, this species has been observed occurring in habitat types such as pine flatwoods, recently-burned scrubs, sandridges, and longleaf pine forests, among others.

It occurs in environments with loamy soil, loamy sand, sandy soil, and gravel.

== Ecology ==
Scutellaria multiglandulosa is insect pollinated and is recorded to have been visited in northern Florida by Ceratina.
