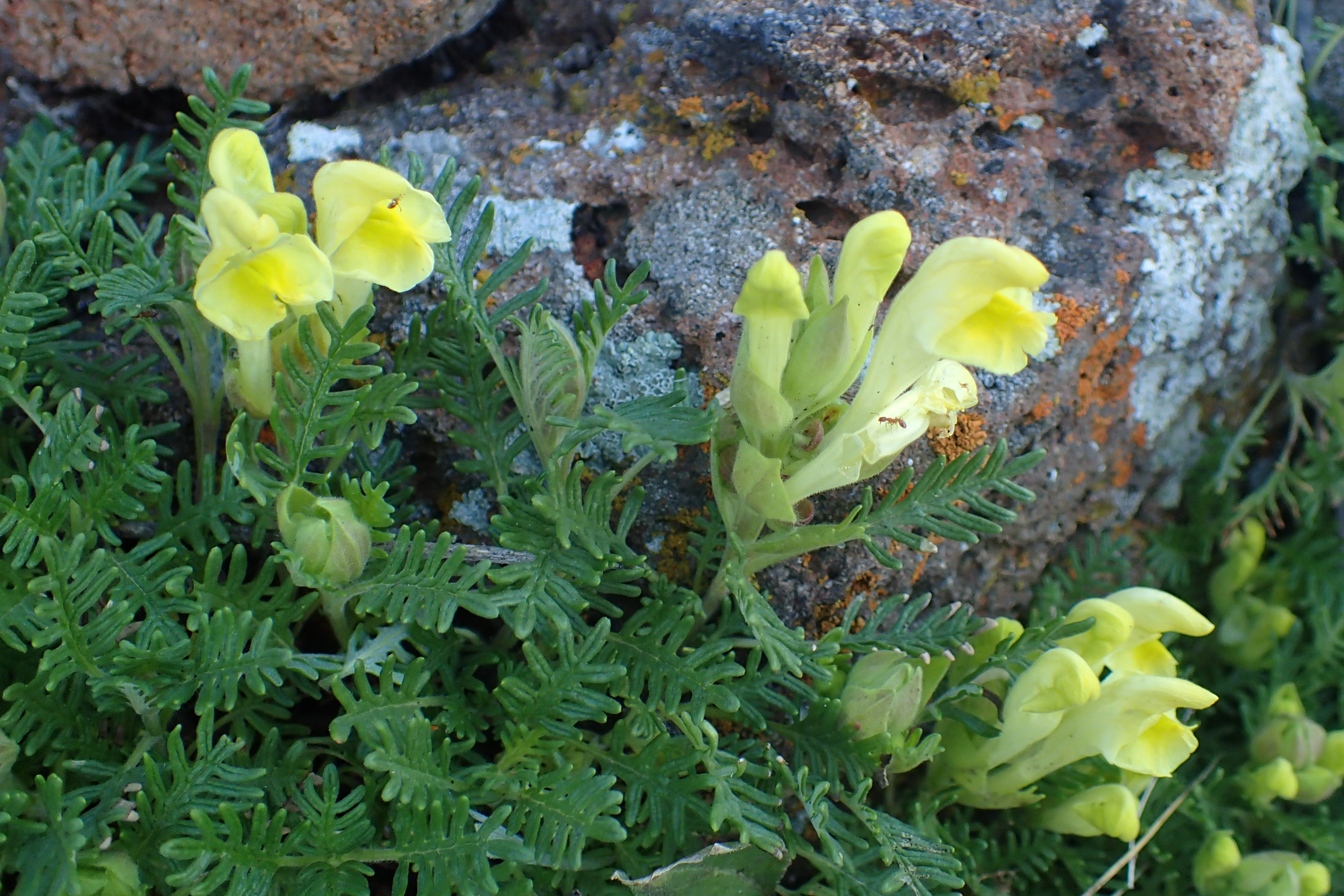

Scientific classification
- Kingdom: Plantae
- Clade: Tracheophytes
- Clade: Angiosperms
- Clade: Eudicots
- Clade: Asterids
- Order: Lamiales
- Family: Lamiaceae
- Genus: Scutellaria
- Species: S. orientalis

Binomial name
- Scutellaria orientalis L.

= Scutellaria orientalis =

Yellow-flowered skull cap

Species of flowering plant

Scutellaria orientalis, also known as yellow-flowered skull cap or yellow helmet flower, is a species of alpine rhizomatous perennial belonging to the genus Scutellaria, and classified under the family Lamiaceae.

== Description ==
The deciduous plant is woody-based, and its leaves are dark green and deeply toothed. The stems grow directly from the ground. Its flowers are yellow, upright tubes with hooded tops up to 3 cm long. They grow very densely together during the prime of the season in summer. The plant has a USDA Zone-5 hardiness level, and is able to grow in the harsh conditions of alpine tundra.
