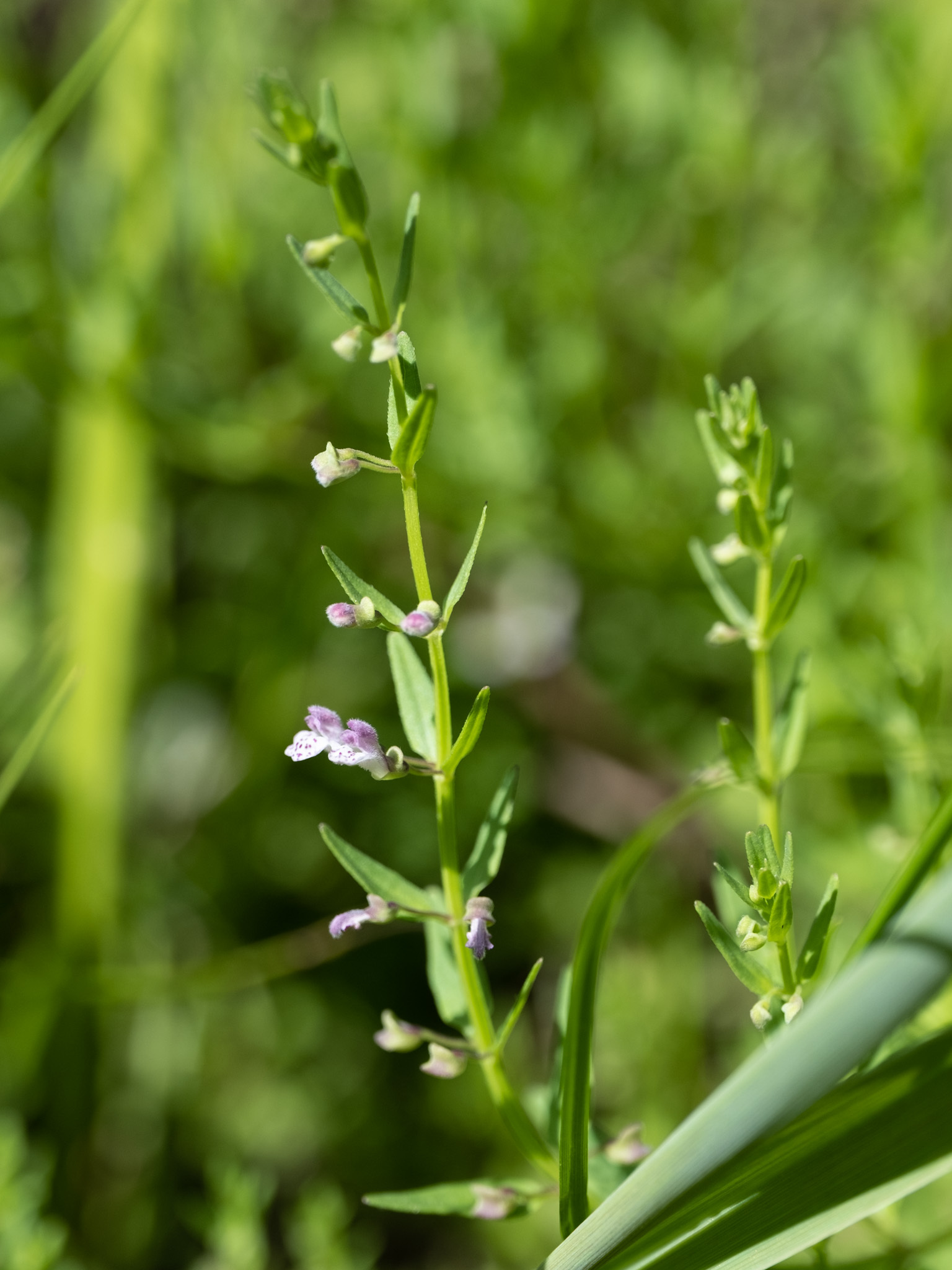

Scientific classification
- Kingdom: Plantae
- Clade: Tracheophytes
- Clade: Angiosperms
- Clade: Eudicots
- Clade: Asterids
- Order: Lamiales
- Family: Lamiaceae
- Genus: Scutellaria
- Species: S. racemosa

Binomial name
- Scutellaria racemosa Pers.

= Scutellaria racemosa =

Species of flowering plant

Scutellaria racemosa is a species of flowering plant in the mint family (Lamiaceae). It is one of the many species in the genus Scutellaria, commonly known as skullcaps.

== Description ==
Scutellaria racemosa is a small odorless herb characterized by the typical mint family features of opposite leaves and square stems. The inflorescence consists of axillary flowers with bilabiate, pinkish-purple corollas. Mature cauline leaves are generally slightly hastate.

== Distribution and habitat ==
According to Plants of the World Online, Scutellaria racemosa is native to parts of North America. It is typically found in open habitats such as prairies, meadows, rocky slopes, and woodland edges where well-drained soils prevail.

== Taxonomy ==
Scutellaria racemosa was first described by Christiaan Hendrik Persoon in 1806. The genus Scutellaria is large, with many species commonly referred to as skullcaps due to the shape of the upper calyx and its characteristic protuberance. The specific epithet "racemosa" refers to the raceme-like structure of the inflorescences.
