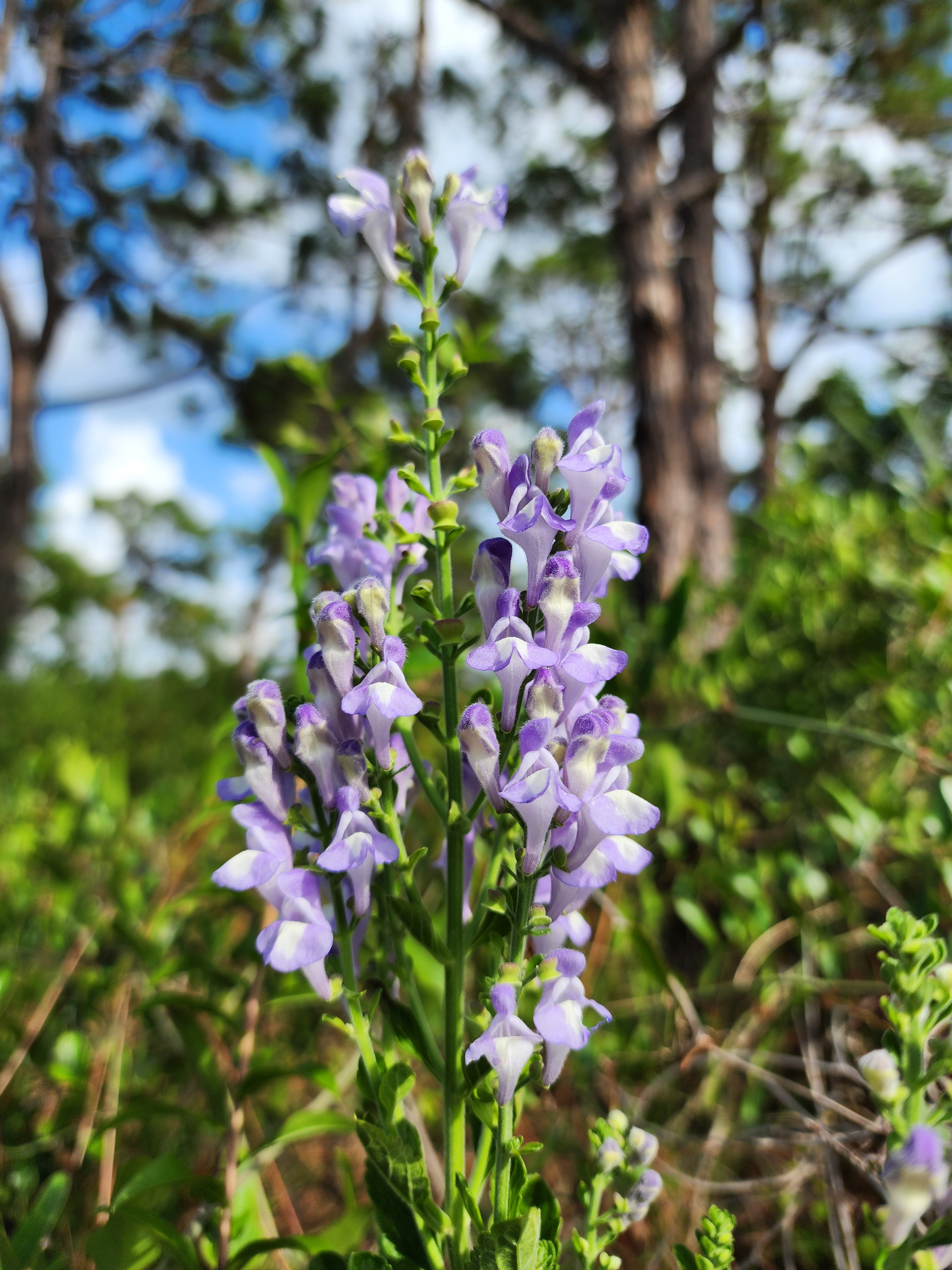

Conservation status
- Vulnerable (NatureServe)

Scientific classification
- Kingdom: Plantae
- Clade: Tracheophytes
- Clade: Angiosperms
- Clade: Eudicots
- Clade: Asterids
- Order: Lamiales
- Family: Lamiaceae
- Genus: Scutellaria
- Species: S. arenicola

Binomial name
- Scutellaria arenicola Small, Bull.

= Scutellaria arenicola =

Species of flowering plant

Scutellaria arenicola, commonly called Florida scrub skullcap, is a species of perennial herb endemic to the U.S. southeast coastal plain in the states of Florida and Georgia.

== Habitat ==
It occurs in sandy, fire-dependent habitats of the extreme southeast including longleaf pine sandhill and Florida scrub.

== Conservation ==
Due to its restricted habitat requirements and limited range, it is considered vulnerable.
