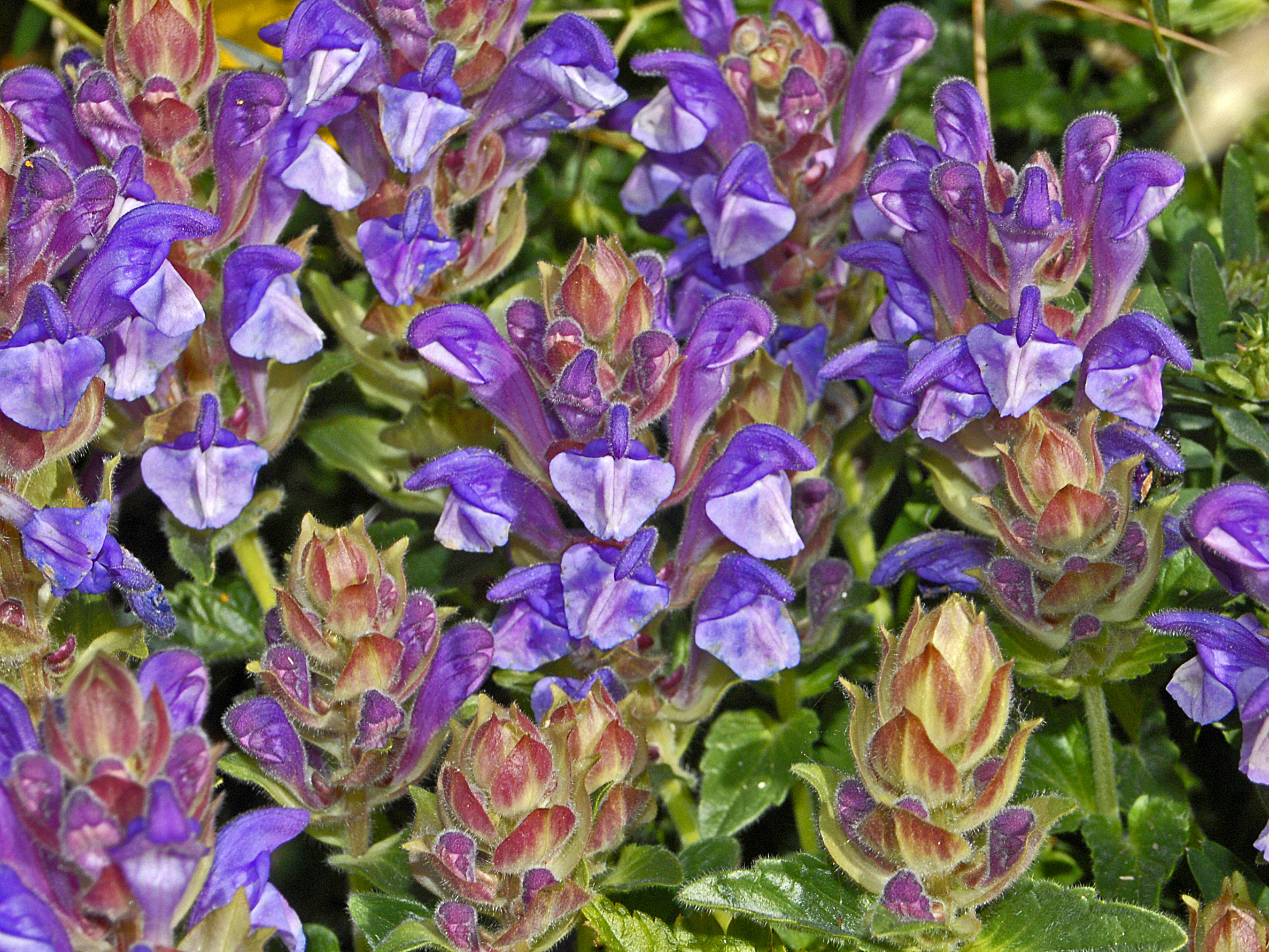
- Flowers of Scutellaria alpina at the Giardino Botanico Alpino Chanousia

Scientific classification
- Kingdom: Plantae
- Clade: Tracheophytes
- Clade: Angiosperms
- Clade: Eudicots
- Clade: Asterids
- Order: Lamiales
- Family: Lamiaceae
- Genus: Scutellaria
- Species: S. alpina

Binomial name
- Scutellaria alpina L.

= Scutellaria alpina =

Species of flowering plant

Scutellaria alpina, the alpine skullcap, is a species of flowering plant in the mint family, Lamiaceae.

== Description ==
Scutellaria alpina can reach a height of 10–30 centimetres (3.9–11.8 in). It is a small rhizomatous perennial plant. The stems are square, prostrate-ascending, branched, woody at the base and hairy. Leaves are arranged in opposite pairs, pubescent, oval, rounded at the base, 2–3 cm long, with a short petiole and crenulate margins. Inflorescence is a terminal tetragonal spike. The flowers are blue-violet or purple-white, 2.5–3 cm long. They bloom from June to August.

== Distribution ==
This species is native to central and southern Europe and Russia.

== Habitat ==
Scutellaria alpina prefers rocky areas in high calcareous mountains at elevation of 1,400–2,500 metres (4,600–8,200 ft) above sea level.
