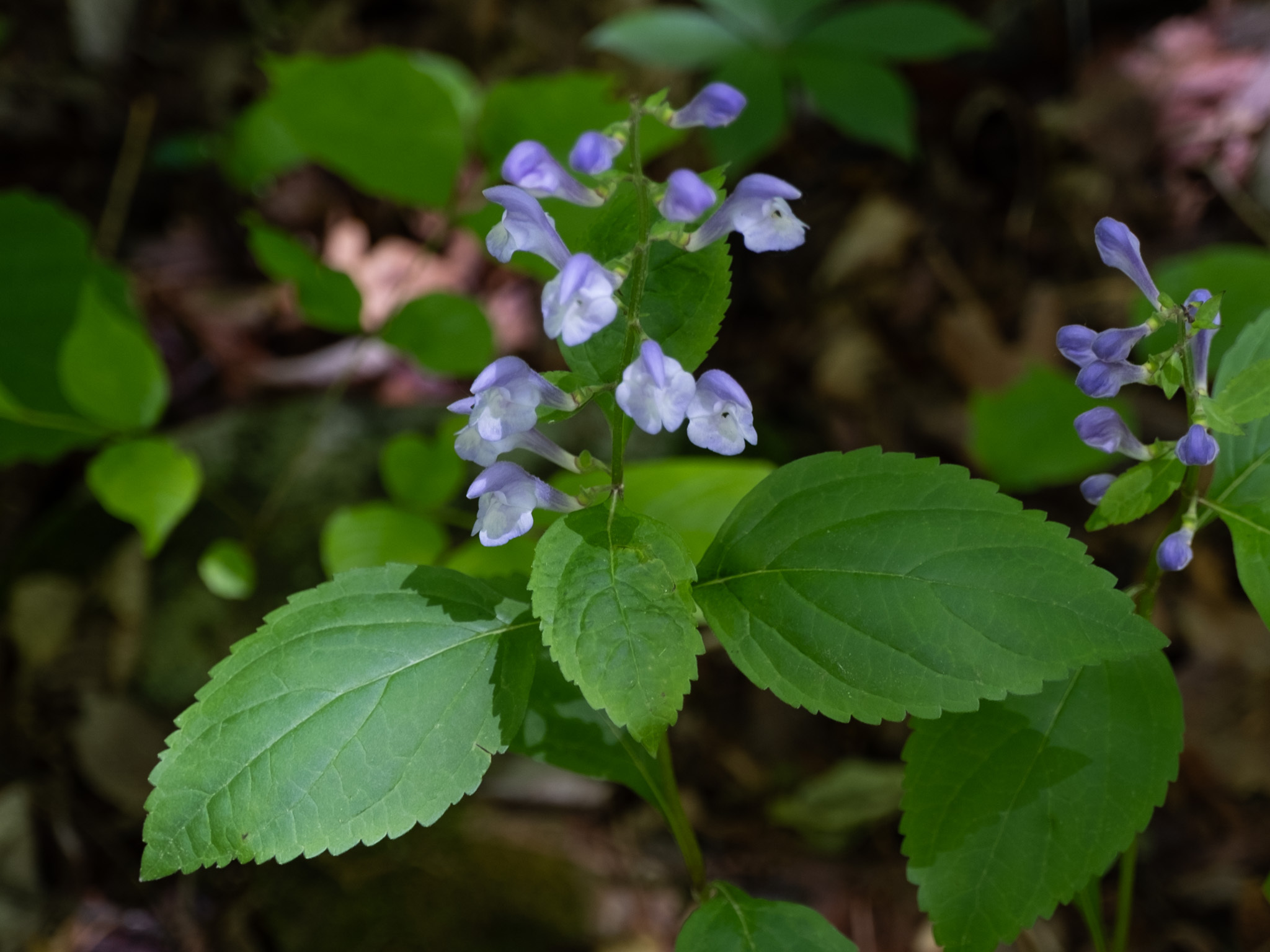
- Scutellaria serrata in Shenandoah National Park

Scientific classification
- Kingdom: Plantae
- Clade: Tracheophytes
- Clade: Angiosperms
- Clade: Eudicots
- Clade: Asterids
- Order: Lamiales
- Family: Lamiaceae
- Genus: Scutellaria
- Species: S. serrata

Binomial name
- Scutellaria serrata Andrews

= Scutellaria serrata =

Species of plant

Scutellaria serrata, commonly known as showy skullcap or serrate skullcap, is a species of flowering plant in the mint family (Lamiaceae). It is a perennial herb native to the eastern United States, where it occurs in rich forests and other upland wooded habitats.

== Description ==
Scutellaria serrata is a perennial herb with erect, simple stems and opposite leaves. Leaf blades are coarsely toothed and the flowers are borne in terminal racemes. The flowers are typically blue-violet and bilaterally symmetrical, with a tubular corolla typical of the mint family.

== Taxonomy ==
Scutellaria serrata was first described by Henry Cranke Andrews in 1807.
