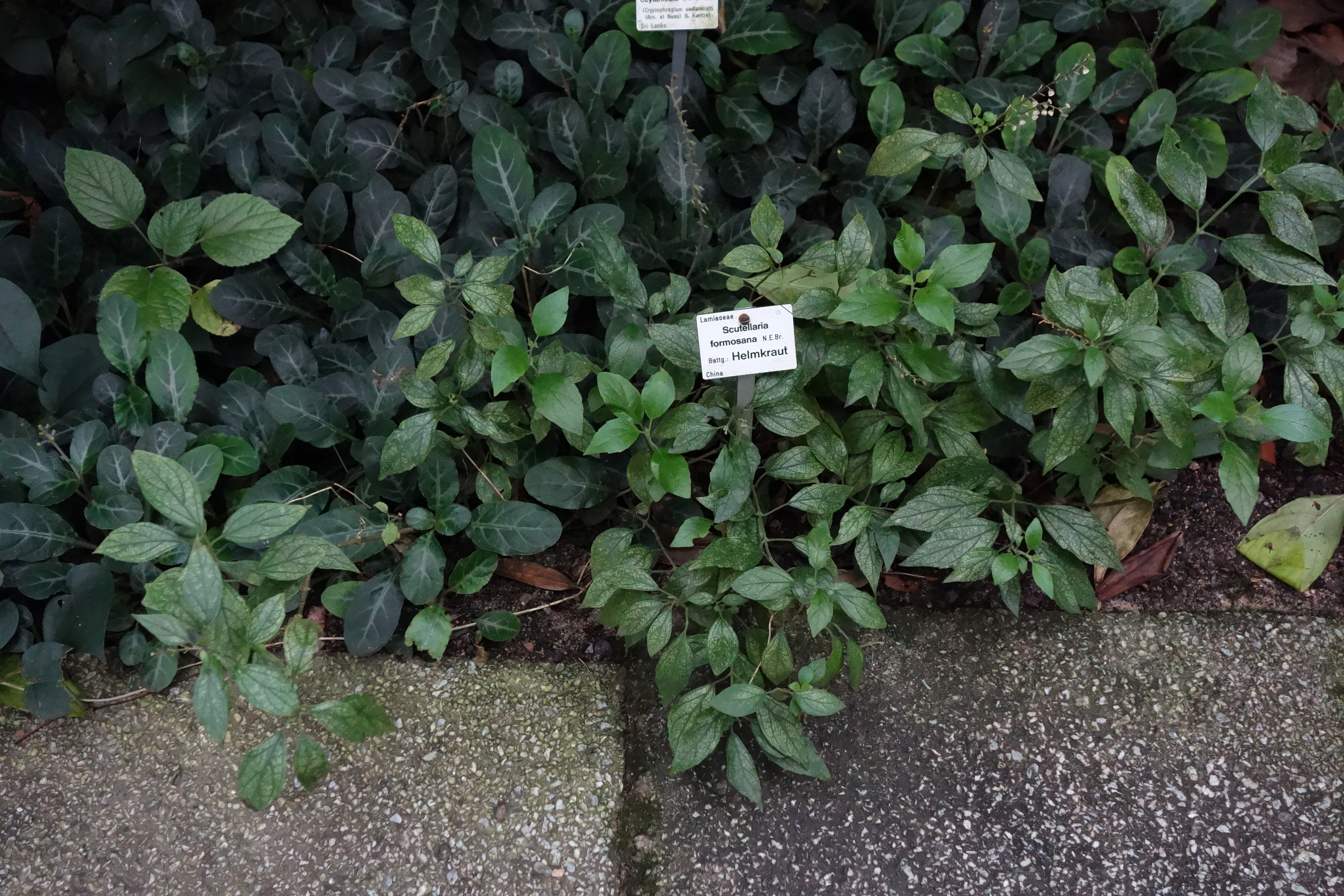

Scientific classification
- Kingdom: Plantae
- Clade: Tracheophytes
- Clade: Angiosperms
- Clade: Eudicots
- Clade: Asterids
- Order: Lamiales
- Family: Lamiaceae
- Genus: Scutellaria
- Species: S. formosana

Binomial name
- Scutellaria formosana N.E.Br.

= Scutellaria formosana =

Species of flowering plant

Scutellaria formosana (蓝花黄芩, lan hua huang qin) is a plant species endemic to the Fujian, Guangdong, Guangxi, Hainan, Jiangxi, and Yunnan provinces in China. It grows on woody stems up to about 30 cm in height, with ovate to ovate-lanceolate leaves 3-8 × 1.5-3.3 cm.
