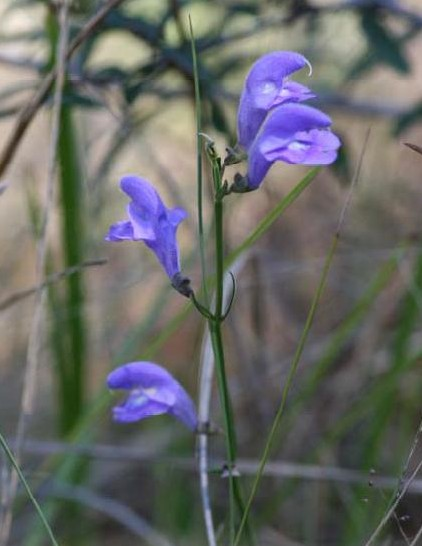

Conservation status
- Imperiled (NatureServe)

Scientific classification
- Kingdom: Plantae
- Clade: Tracheophytes
- Clade: Angiosperms
- Clade: Eudicots
- Clade: Asterids
- Order: Lamiales
- Family: Lamiaceae
- Genus: Scutellaria
- Species: S. floridana

Binomial name
- Scutellaria floridana Chapm.

= Scutellaria floridana =

Species of flowering plant

Scutellaria floridana, the Florida skullcap, is a rare species of flowering plant. It is endemic to Florida in the United States, where it is known only from the Florida Panhandle. It is threatened by a number of human activities and its small population sizes make it vulnerable. It is a federally listed threatened species.

This is a perennial herb growing up to 40 centimeters tall with one or more upright, square-edged stems. The tiny, narrow leaves are linear in shape with rolled edges and are just a few millimeters long. Flowers occur next to the leaves. The corolla has one lower lip and a hoodlike upper lip. It is purple–blue in color with a white spot inside. Blooming occurs in April through July. Blooming is heavier in the seasons after a fire.

This plant grows in soils containing humus and sand. Habitat types include flatwoods, wet prairie, bog, savannah, the transition between flatwoods and wetland areas. The plant's habitat is fire-dependent; it is maintained by a natural fire regime of periodic wildfire. In protected areas that are managed appropriately with prescribed burns the plant is locally abundant and flowers properly. In areas where fire suppression is practiced, large and woody vegetation grows up and produces shade so that the plant does not receive enough sunlight. The plant itself responds to fire. It simply does not produce flowers if it does not burn every three years. Lack of fire is a main threat to the species.

Other threats include habitat destruction during coastal development and the conversion of land to agriculture, particularly silviculture for the paper pulp industry. Off-road vehicle use in the habitat is a threat.

This plant occurs in Gulf, Franklin, and Liberty Counties. Most of the populations are within the Apalachicola National Forest. It can be found in St. Joseph Bay State Buffer Preserve, the Apalachicola River Wildlife and Environmental Area, and Tate's Hell State Forest. Many of these protected populations are healthy. Those which are found on private land, particularly in timber-growing areas, are not.
