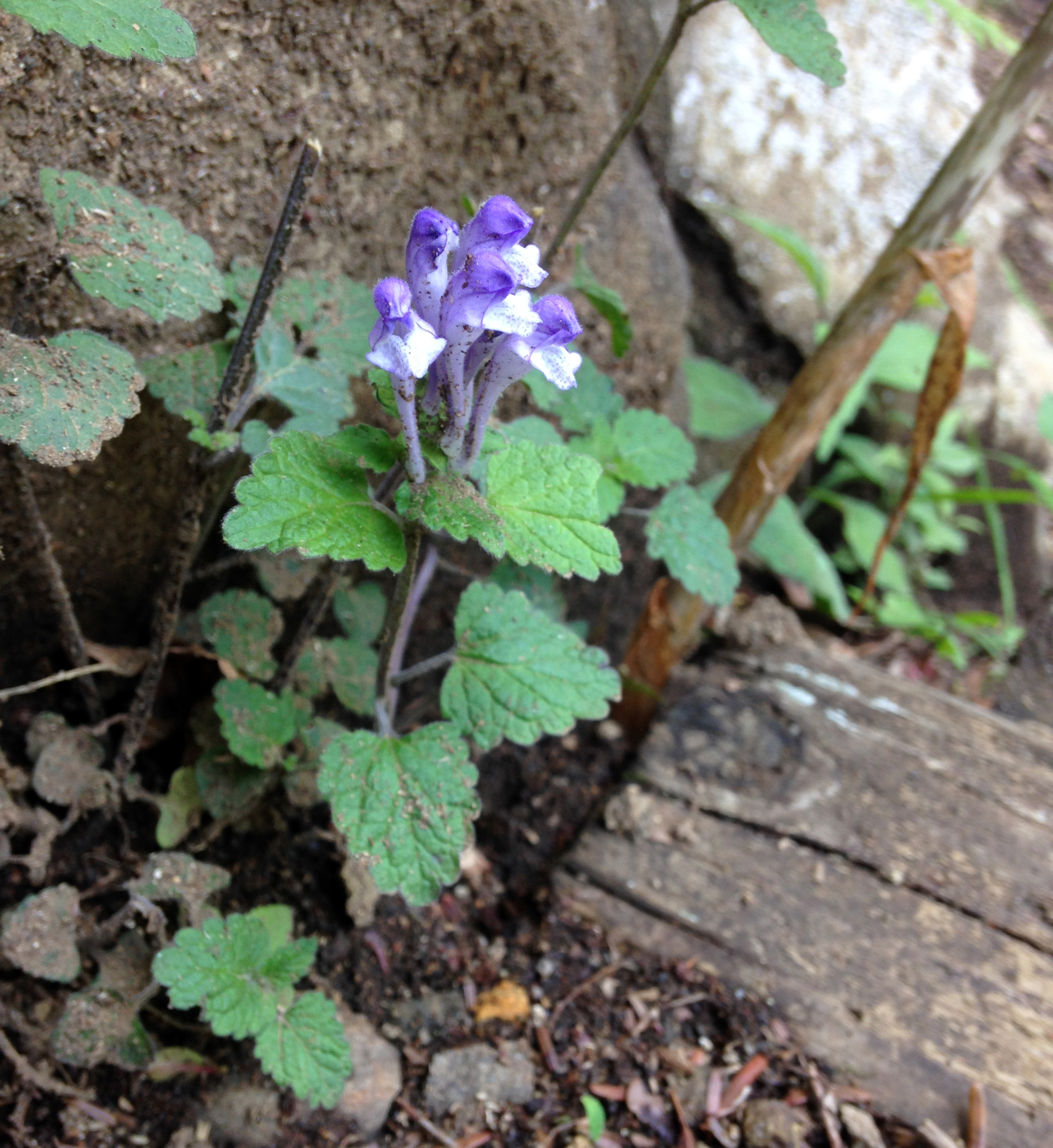

Scientific classification
- Kingdom: Plantae
- Clade: Tracheophytes
- Clade: Angiosperms
- Clade: Eudicots
- Clade: Asterids
- Order: Lamiales
- Family: Lamiaceae
- Genus: Scutellaria
- Species: S. brachyspica

Binomial name
- Scutellaria brachyspica Nakai & H.Hara

= Scutellaria brachyspica =

Species of flowering plant

Scutellaria brachyspica is a species of flowering plant in the mint family (Lamiaceae). It is endemic to Japan, where it is found on the islands of Honshu (south of Miyagi Prefecture) and Shikoku. It is a common species in Japan. Its natural habitat is in forest edges in hilly areas.

Scutellaria brachyspica is a perennial, growing to 50 cm tall. Its blue-white flowers are clustered in a short terminal spikes. It blooms from May to June. The plant has a diploid number of 26.
