= Scutellaria alborosea =

Conservation status
- Vulnerable (IUCN 3.1)

Scientific classification
- Kingdom: Plantae
- Clade: Tracheophytes
- Clade: Angiosperms
- Clade: Eudicots
- Clade: Asterids
- Order: Lamiales
- Family: Lamiaceae
- Genus: Scutellaria
- Species: S. alborosea

Binomial name
- Scutellaria alborosea Lem.

Species of flowering plant

Scutellaria alborosea is a species of flowering plant in the mint family, Lamiaceae. It is endemic to Ecuador, where there are only four known populations.
