= Scutellaria glabriuscula =

Scientific classification
- Kingdom: Plantae
- Clade: Tracheophytes
- Clade: Angiosperms
- Clade: Eudicots
- Clade: Asterids
- Order: Lamiales
- Family: Lamiaceae
- Genus: Scutellaria
- Species: S. glabriuscula

Binomial name
- Scutellaria glabriuscula Fernald

Species of flowering plant

Scutellaria glabriuscula, commonly known as Georgia skullcap, is a flowering plant. It is a perennial dicot in the family Lamiaceae, and is part of the genus Scutellaria. It grows in the Florida panhandle and parts of Georgia, Mississippi, and Alabama.
