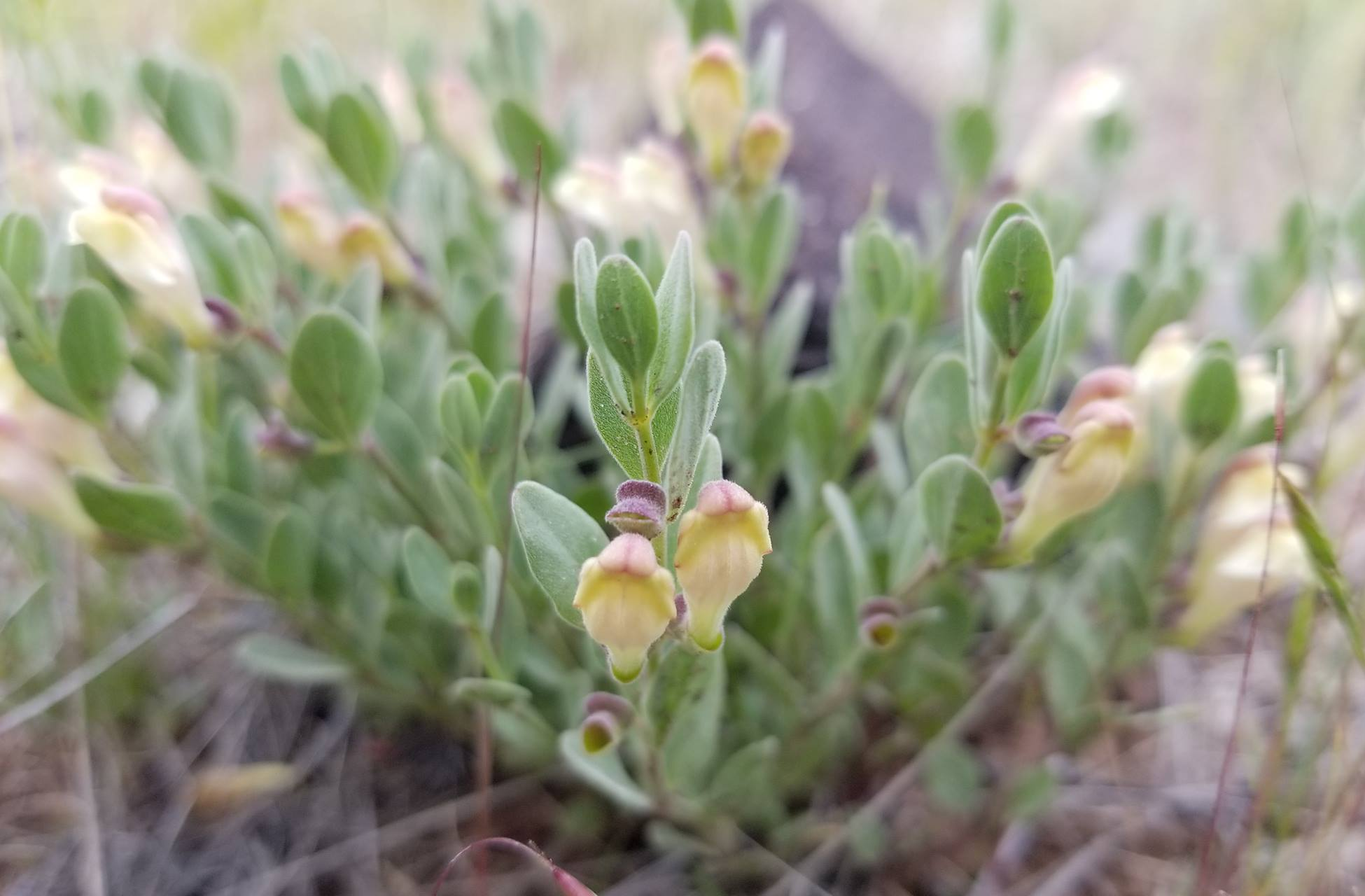

Scientific classification
- Kingdom: Plantae
- Clade: Tracheophytes
- Clade: Angiosperms
- Clade: Eudicots
- Clade: Asterids
- Order: Lamiales
- Family: Lamiaceae
- Genus: Scutellaria
- Species: S. nana

Binomial name
- Scutellaria nana A.Gray

Synonyms
- Scutellaria holmgreniorum

= Scutellaria nana =

Species of flowering plant

Scutellaria nana is a species of flowering plant in the mint family known by the common names dwarf skullcap and dwarf scullcap. It is native to the western United States, especially in and around the Great Basin. It grows in plateau scrub, often on volcanic soils. It is a small perennial herb producing one or more erect stems up to about 20 centimeters tall from a rhizome. It is coated in tiny flat hairs which sometimes have resin glands. The leaves are oval or diamond-shaped, the lower ones borne on short petioles. Flowers occur in the leaf axils, each borne in a calyx of sepals with a prominent ridge on the upper surface. The corolla is up to 2 centimeters long, tubular in shape, and generally white or yellowish with purple mottling on the lips.

Like several other skullcap species, this plant is used medicinally.
