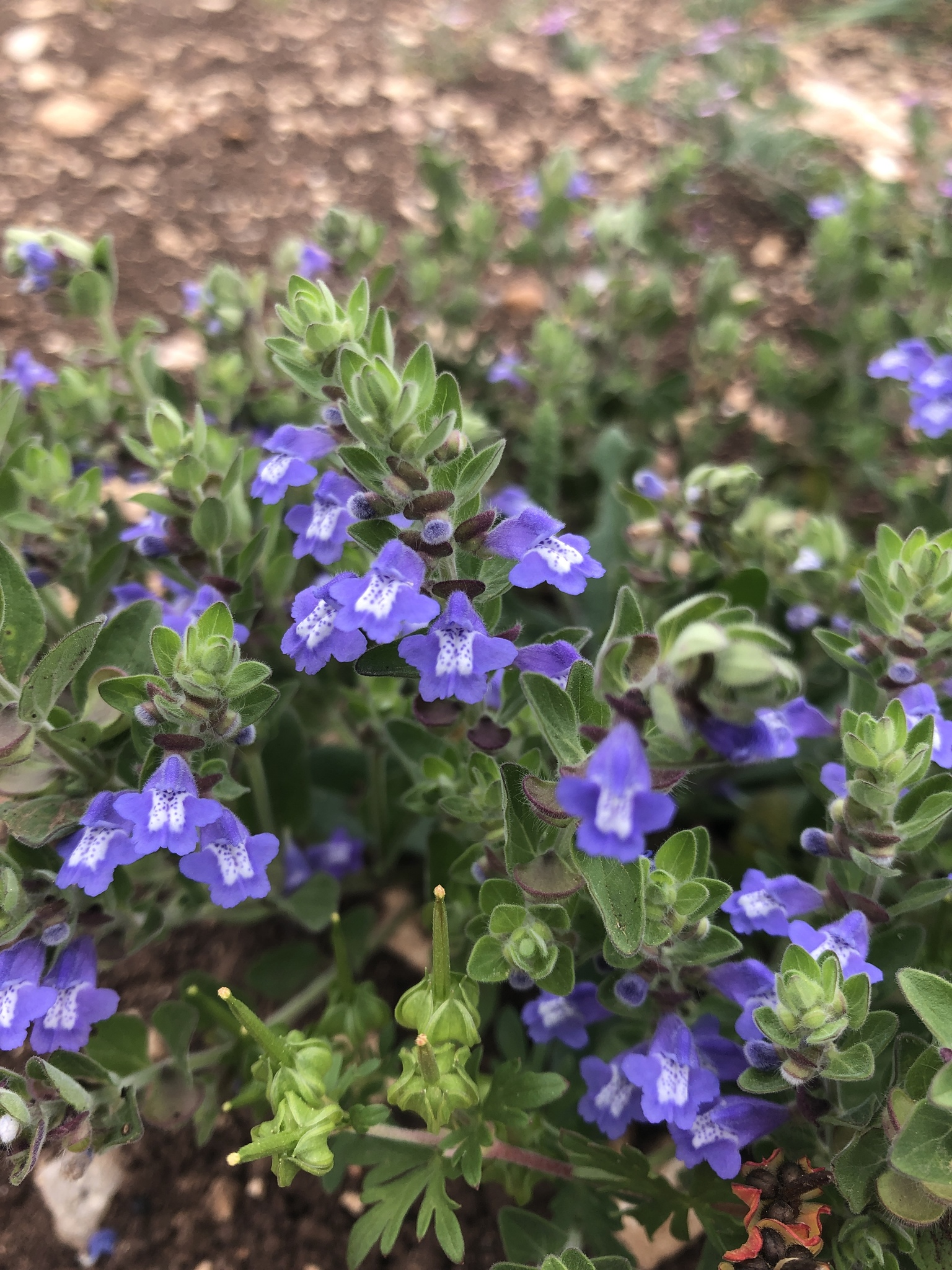

Scientific classification
- Kingdom: Plantae
- Clade: Tracheophytes
- Clade: Angiosperms
- Clade: Eudicots
- Clade: Asterids
- Order: Lamiales
- Family: Lamiaceae
- Genus: Scutellaria
- Species: S. drummondii

Binomial name
- Scutellaria drummondii Benth.

= Scutellaria drummondii =

Species of shrub

Scutellaria drummondii, commonly known as Drummond's skullcap, is a species of herbaceous shrub native to the southern United States and north-eastern Mexico.
