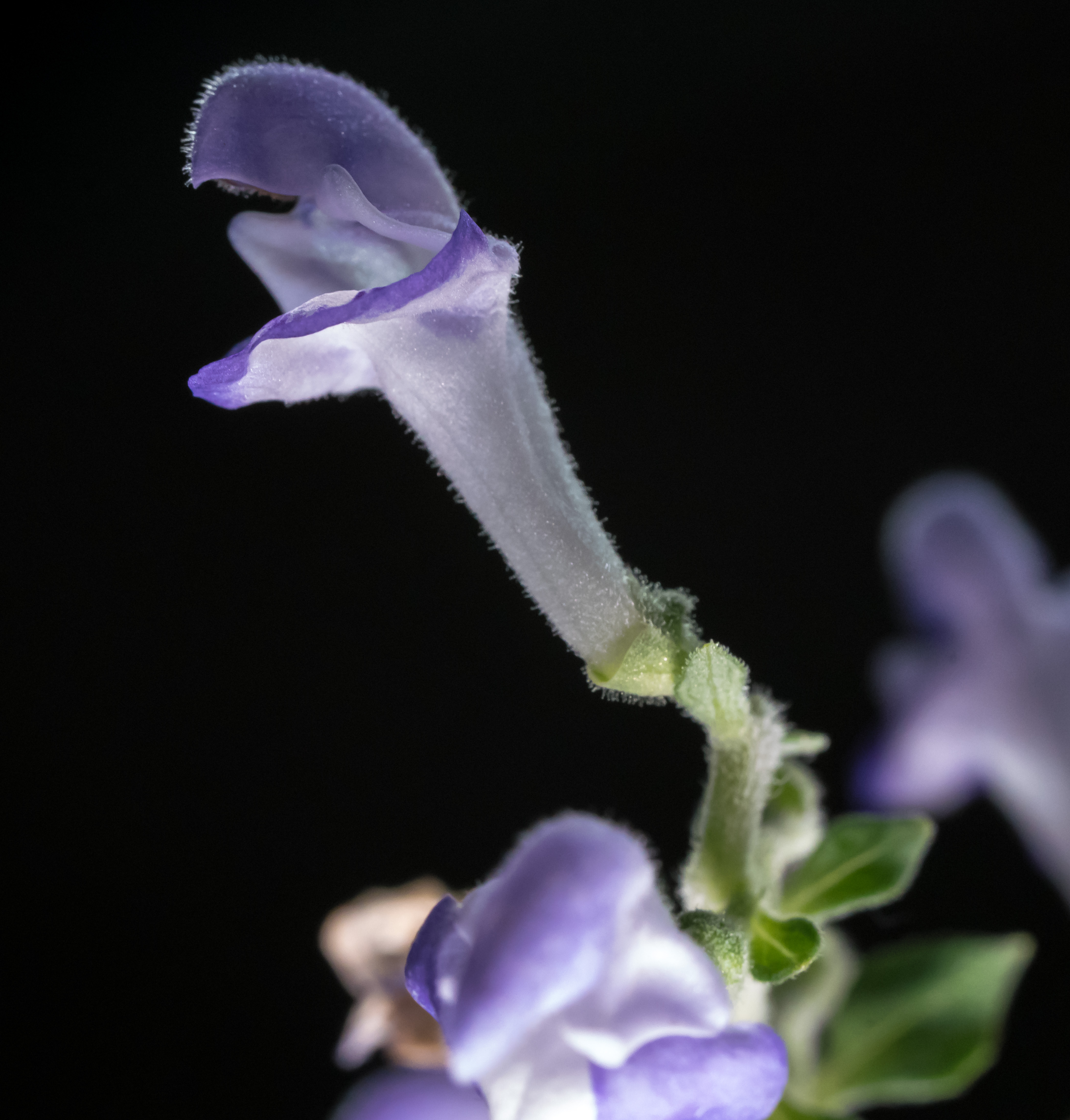

Conservation status
- Imperiled (NatureServe)

Scientific classification
- Kingdom: Plantae
- Clade: Tracheophytes
- Clade: Angiosperms
- Clade: Eudicots
- Clade: Asterids
- Order: Lamiales
- Family: Lamiaceae
- Genus: Scutellaria
- Species: S. alabamensis

Binomial name
- Scutellaria alabamensis Alexander

= Scutellaria alabamensis =

Alabama skullcap

Species of wildflower

Scutellaria alabamensis, known as Alabama skullcap, is a rare and endangered wildflower, endemic only to 9 counties in North central Alabama.

== Description ==
Alabama skullcap is an erect perennial herb, usually 4.5–6 cm tall, that produces blue and white flowers in an elongated cluster (rarely, flanked by 2 lateral clusters). Blooms early June-early July.

It is one of 300-400 members of the Scutellaria genus of flowering plants, commonly known as skullcaps.

The skullcap name is because of the resemblance to medieval helmets.

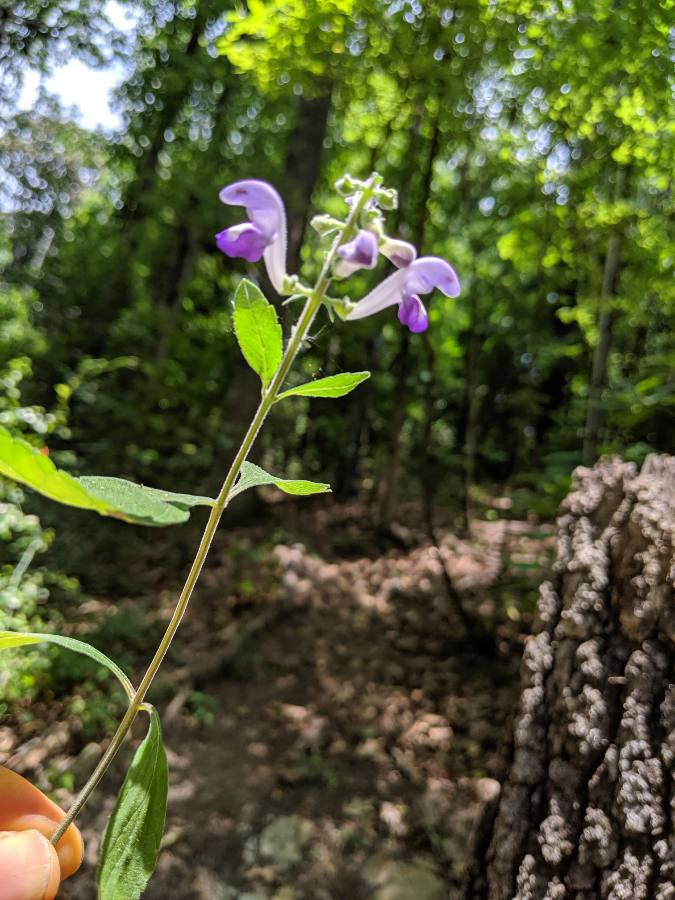
Stem

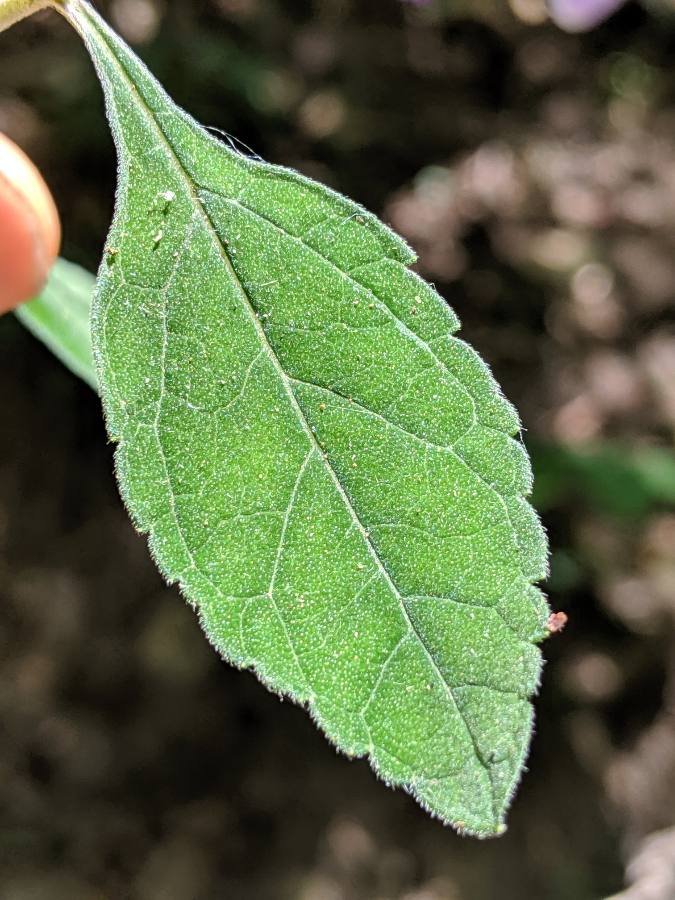
Leaf
