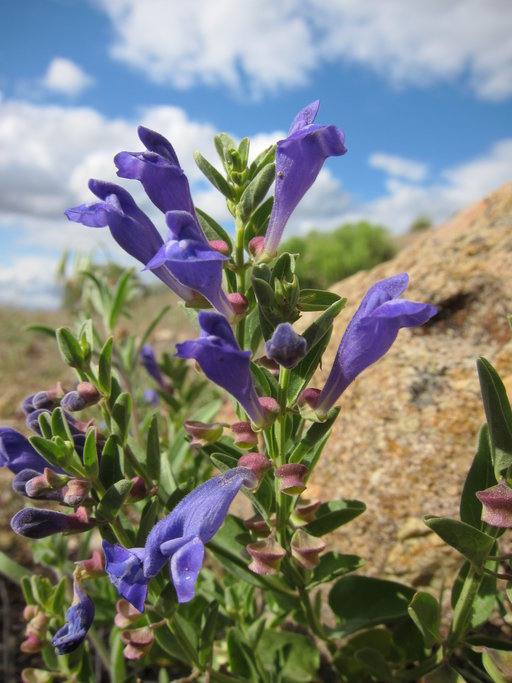

Conservation status
- Secure (NatureServe)

Scientific classification
- Kingdom: Plantae
- Clade: Tracheophytes
- Clade: Angiosperms
- Clade: Eudicots
- Clade: Asterids
- Order: Lamiales
- Family: Lamiaceae
- Genus: Scutellaria
- Species: S. antirrhinoides

Binomial name
- Scutellaria antirrhinoides Benth.

= Scutellaria antirrhinoides =

Species of flowering plant

Scutellaria antirrhinoides is a species of flowering plant in the mint family known by the common names nose skullcap and snapdragon skullcap. It is native to the western United States, where it grows in forests, woodlands, and open, rocky habitat types. It is a perennial herb producing an erect stem or cluster of stems up to 35 centimeters tall from a system of thin rhizomes. The stems are coated in short hairs which are curled or angled upward and sometimes have resin glands. The oval leaves are coated in tiny hairs and are oppositely arranged. The lowest leaves are borne on short petioles. Flowers emerge from the leaf axils. Each flower is held in a calyx of sepals with a large ridge or appendage on the upper part. The corolla measures up to 2 cm long, tubular in shape with a large upper and lower lip. The upper lip is folded into a beaklike protrusion and the lower has three flat lobes. The corolla is purple to blue with an area of white mottling on the lower lip.
