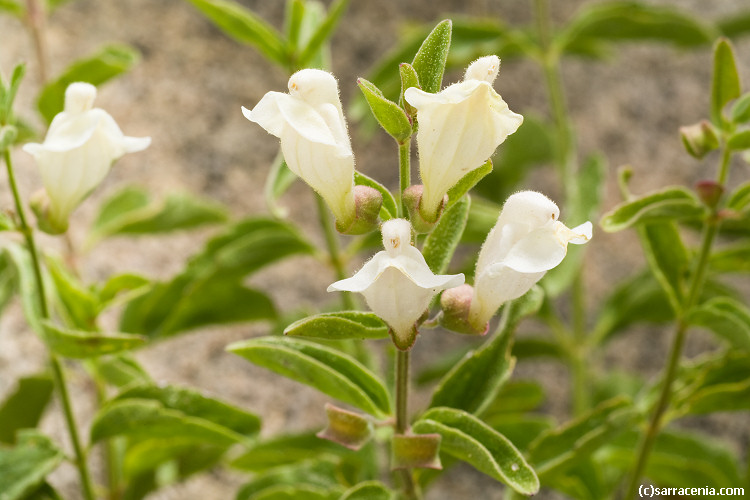

Scientific classification
- Kingdom: Plantae
- Clade: Tracheophytes
- Clade: Angiosperms
- Clade: Eudicots
- Clade: Asterids
- Order: Lamiales
- Family: Lamiaceae
- Genus: Scutellaria
- Species: S. californica

Binomial name
- Scutellaria californica A.Gray

= Scutellaria californica =

Species of flowering plant

Scutellaria californica, the California skullcap, is a species of plant endemic to California. It is found in the scrub and low elevation mountains of Northern California.

It is a small plant growing up to half a meter high, bearing small, white or yellowish snapdragon-like flowers which are said to smell of apples. The leaves are green and arranged oppositely on the erect stem.
