= Scutellaria hastifolia =

Scientific classification
- Kingdom: Plantae
- Clade: Tracheophytes
- Clade: Angiosperms
- Clade: Eudicots
- Clade: Asterids
- Order: Lamiales
- Family: Lamiaceae
- Genus: Scutellaria
- Species: S. hastifolia

Binomial name
- Scutellaria hastifolia L.

Species of flowering plant

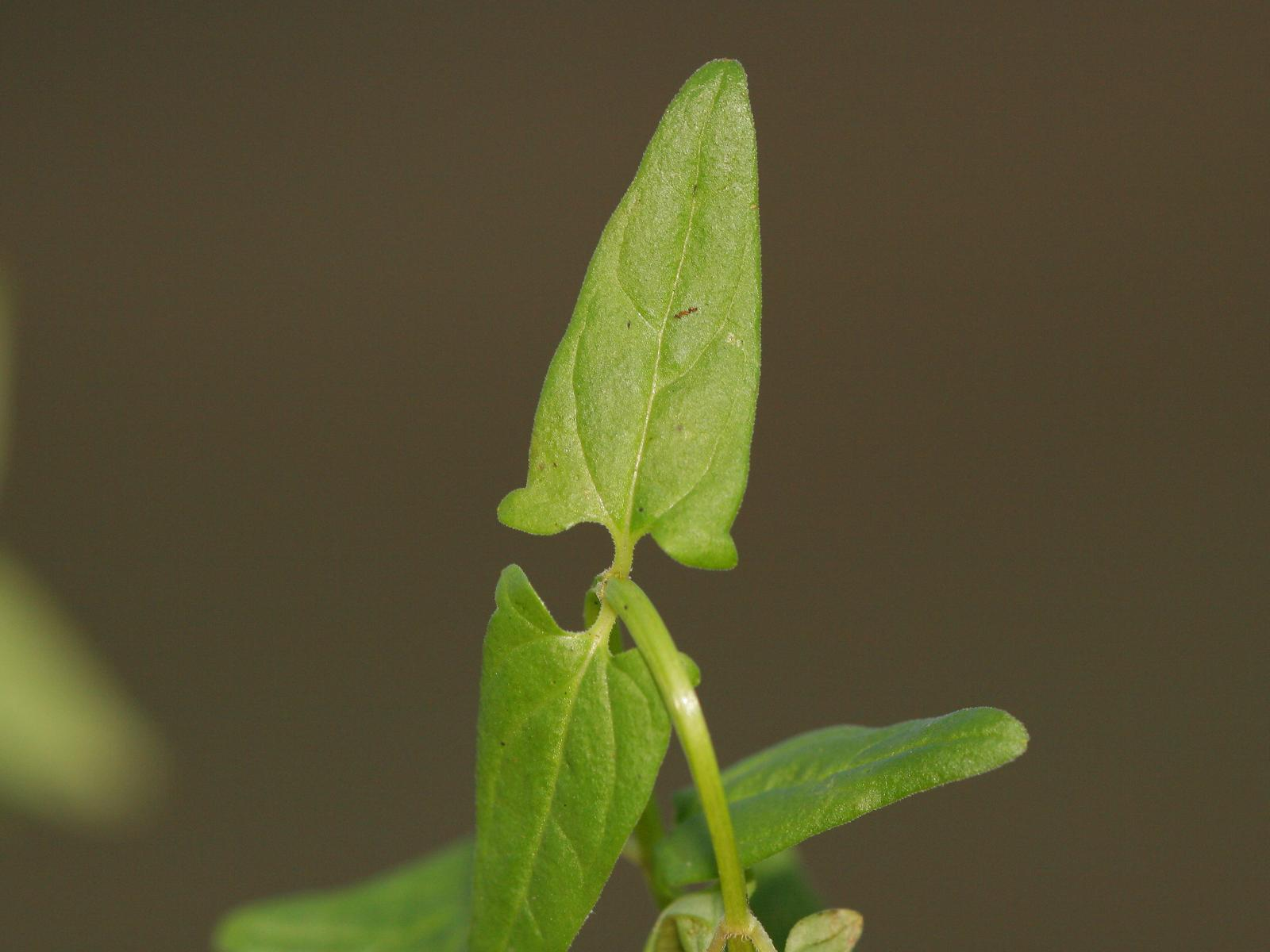
Scutellaria hastifolia

Scutellaria hastifolia is a species of flowering plant belonging to the family Lamiaceae.

Its native range is Europe to Western Siberia and Caucasus.
