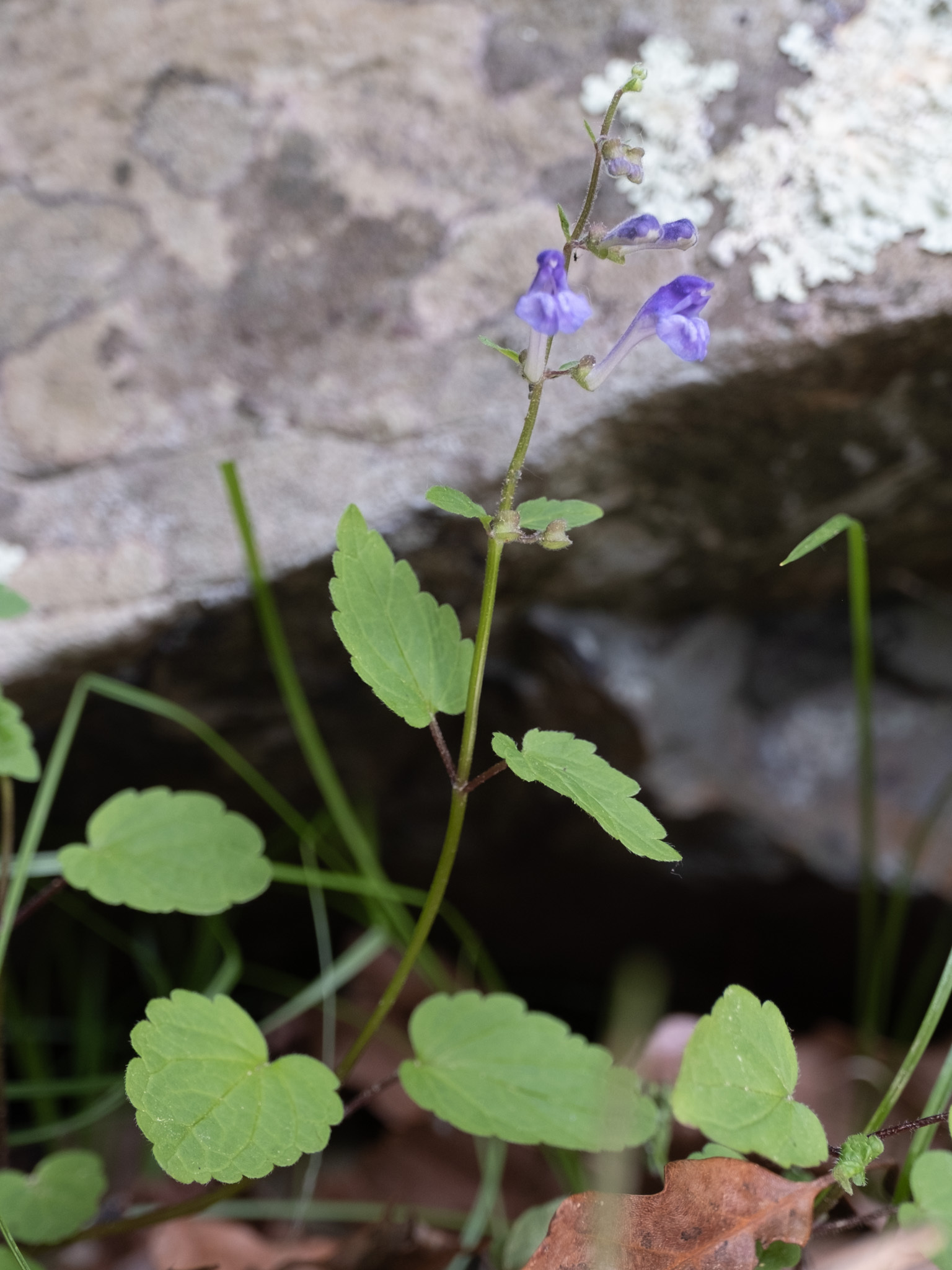

Scientific classification
- Kingdom: Plantae
- Clade: Tracheophytes
- Clade: Angiosperms
- Clade: Eudicots
- Clade: Asterids
- Order: Lamiales
- Family: Lamiaceae
- Genus: Scutellaria
- Species: S. saxatilis

Binomial name
- Scutellaria saxatilis Riddell

= Scutellaria saxatilis =

Species of flowering plant

Scutellaria saxatilis is a species of flowering plant in the mint family (Lamiaceae), commonly known as rock skullcap. It is native to the southeastern United States, where it occurs on rocky woods, bluffs, and limestone outcrops.

== Description ==
Scutellaria saxatilis is a perennial herb characterized by typical traits of the genus Scutellaria, including opposite leaves, square stems, and the distinctive two-lipped flowers with a flattened “scutellum” (shield-like) appendage on the calyx that gives skullcaps their common name. The plants generally form low mats or clumps on rocky substrates. The flowers are often small and can range in color from blue to purple.

== Distribution and habitat ==
Scutellaria saxatilis is native to the southeastern United States. According to the Tennessee-Kentucky Plant Atlas, it occurs in Tennessee and Kentucky, where it is most often found on rocky wooded slopes, cliffs, limestone bluffs, and similar calcareous outcrops. Its habitat is characterized by well-drained soils and partial shade typical of upland woodland and rocky landscapes.

== Taxonomy ==
Scutellaria saxatilis was first described by John Leonard Riddell, and the species name is accepted by major plant taxonomic authorities, including Plants of the World Online. The specific epithet saxatilis refers to its association with rocky habitats (Latin: “dwelling among rocks”).
