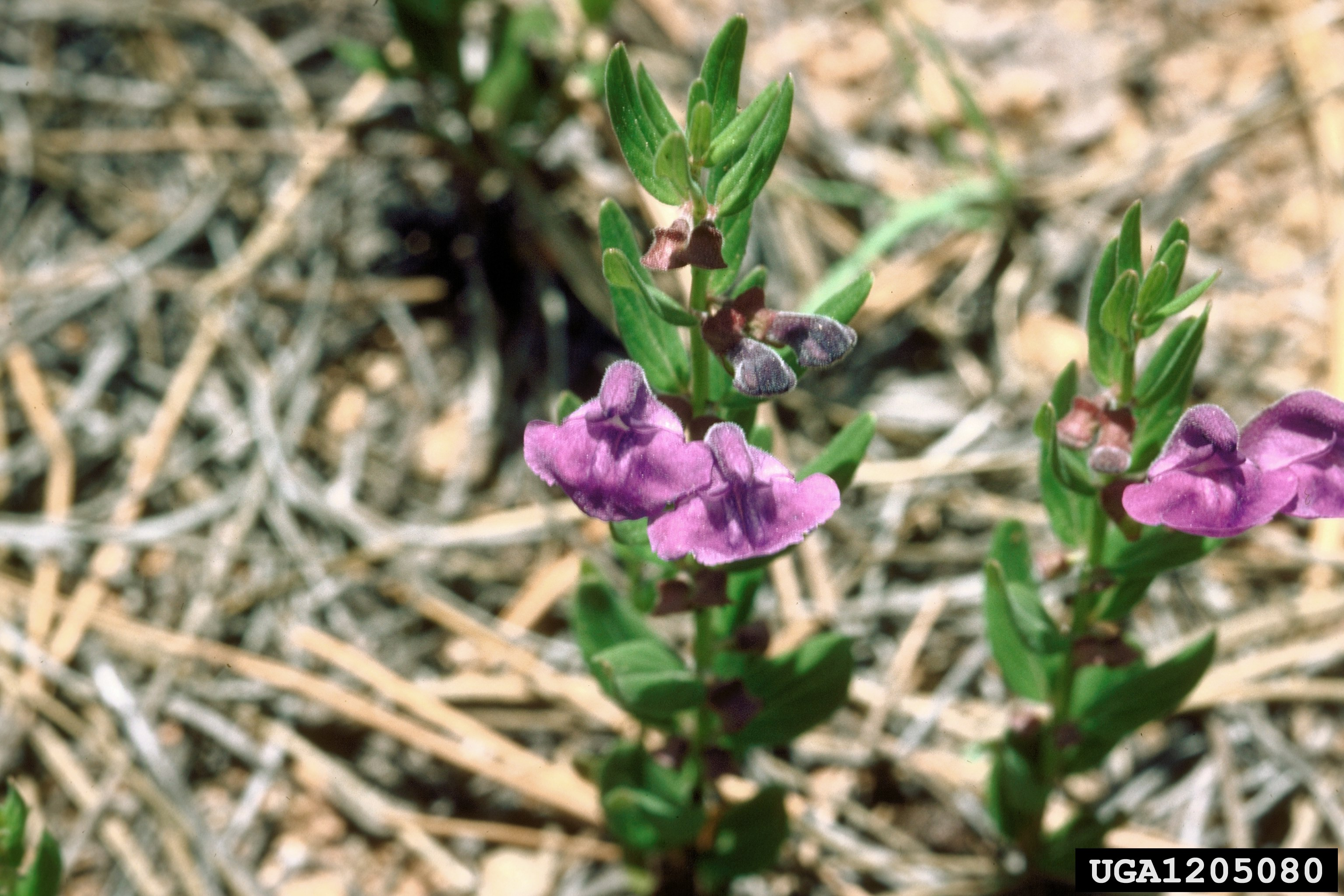

Conservation status
- Apparently Secure (NatureServe)

Scientific classification
- Kingdom: Plantae
- Clade: Tracheophytes
- Clade: Angiosperms
- Clade: Eudicots
- Clade: Asterids
- Order: Lamiales
- Family: Lamiaceae
- Genus: Scutellaria
- Species: S. brittonii

Binomial name
- Scutellaria brittonii Porter

Synonyms
- Scutellaria brittonii var. virgulata Rydb.; Scutellaria virgulata A.Nelson

= Scutellaria brittonii =

Plant species in the mint family

Scutellaria brittonii, also known at Britton's skullcap, is a flowering perennial native to Wyoming, Colorado, New Mexico, Nebraska, and Kansas in the United States. It is classified under the genus Scutellaria and is also part of the mint family, Lamiaceae. It grows on dry mountain slopes and in full sun.

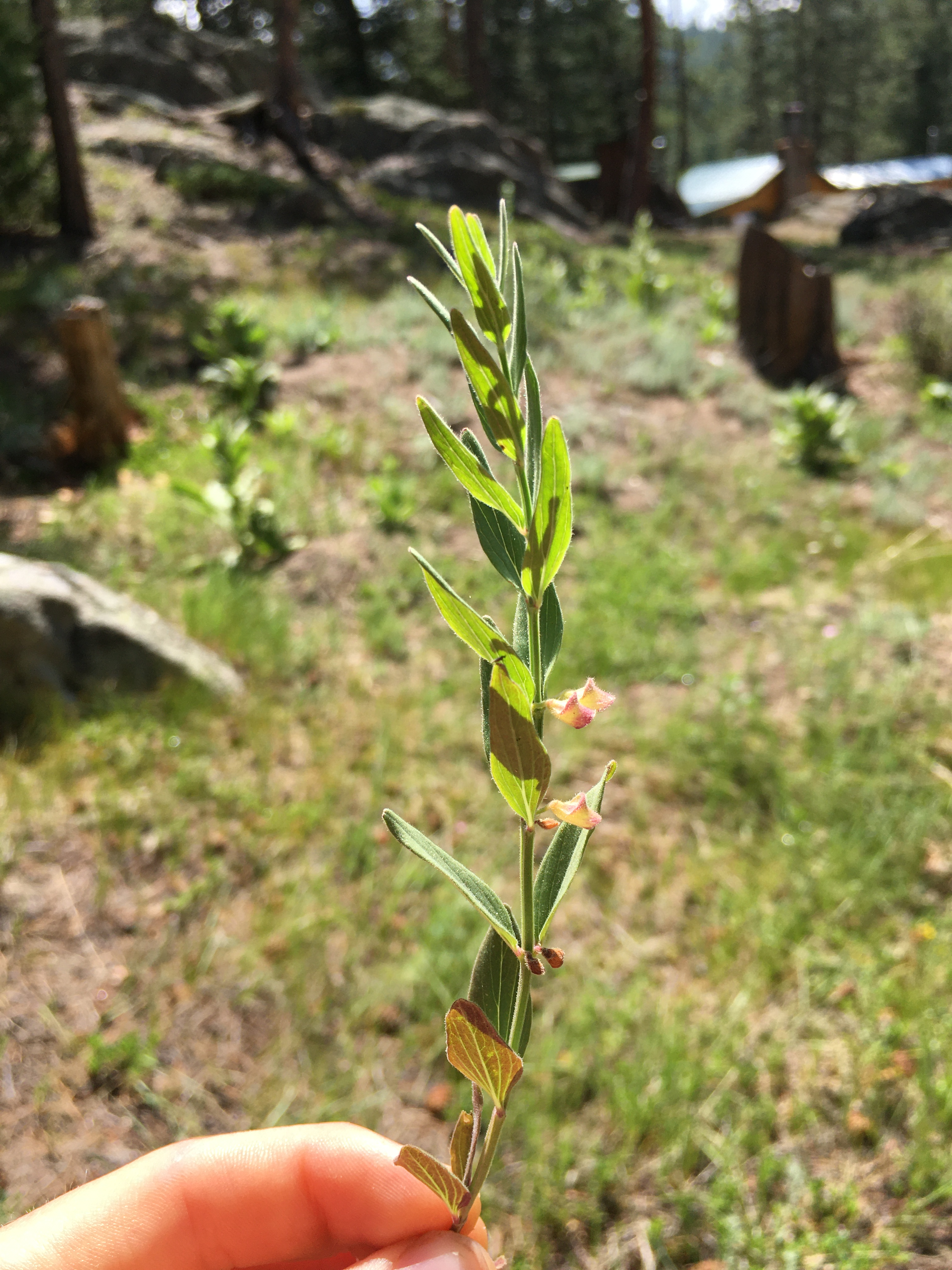
Late season Scutellaria brittonii showing sepals

== Description ==
Scutellaria brittonii is upright, growing anywhere from 4"-8" tall in a given season. Leaves grow opposite each other on a square stem and are long and thin. The veins on the leaf surfaces are long and extend almost the full length of the leaf, close to parallel to one another. Flowers generally grow in an upwards direction out of a calyx. The calyx is reddish purple and has a slit in the middle out of which the flower grows. The upper lip of the calyx has a width-wise ridge on the top. The flowers are composed of a hornlike tube which curves up and then opens to form a hooded flower. The base of the tube is generally white, becoming more purple the farther it gets from the stem. The upper hood of the flower is narrower than the lower lip, which fans out below the hood. Flowers range from about 1"-1.5" in length and grow in clusters from the leaf nodes. All parts of the plant are covered in a myriad soft, short hairs.
