= Scutellaria siphocampyloides =

Scientific classification
- Kingdom: Plantae
- Clade: Tracheophytes
- Clade: Angiosperms
- Clade: Eudicots
- Clade: Asterids
- Order: Lamiales
- Family: Lamiaceae
- Genus: Scutellaria
- Species: S. siphocampyloides

Binomial name
- Scutellaria siphocampyloides Vatke

Synonyms
- Scutellaria austiniae

Species of flowering plant

Scutellaria siphocampyloides is a species of flowering plant in the mint family known by the common name grayleaf skullcap. It is endemic to California, where it is widespread throughout the mountain and coastal regions; it is absent from the deserts and the Central Valley. It can be found in forest and woodland habitat, and a variety of open habitat types. It is a perennial herb producing an erect stem or cluster of stems up to about half a meter tall from a system of thin rhizomes. The stems are coated in short, flattened hairs which sometimes have resin glands. The oval leaves are oppositely arranged. The lowest leaves are borne on short petioles. Flowers emerge from the leaf axils. Each flower is held in a calyx of sepals with a large ridge or appendage on the upper part. The tubular corolla can be up to 3.5 centimeters long and has a large upper and lower lip. The upper lip is folded into a beaklike protrusion and the lower has three wide lobes. The corolla is pale lavender to deep purple in color, sometimes with white mottling on the lower lip.
