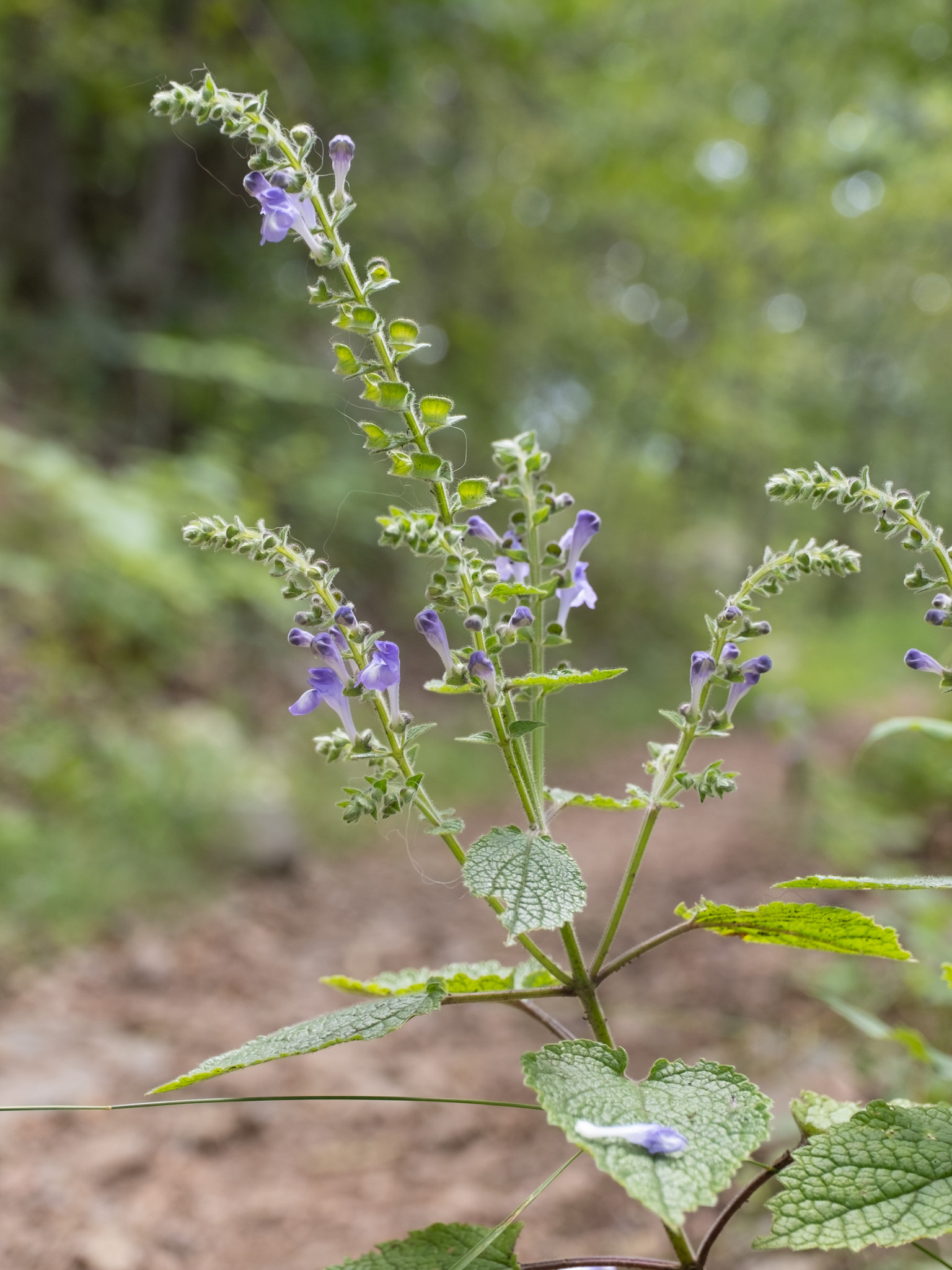

Scientific classification
- Kingdom: Plantae
- Clade: Tracheophytes
- Clade: Angiosperms
- Clade: Eudicots
- Clade: Asterids
- Order: Lamiales
- Family: Lamiaceae
- Genus: Scutellaria
- Species: S. ovata

Binomial name
- Scutellaria ovata Hill

= Scutellaria ovata =

Species of flowering plant

Scutellaria ovata, commonly known as the heartleaf skullcap, is a member of the mint family (Lamiaceae). Its range in the United States is from Minnesota to Florida, and from Texas to the Atlantic coast. It is also native to Mexico.

== Description ==
Scutellaria ovata is an erect perennial, growing to around 80 cm tall. Its flowers are blue, and produced from May to October. The flowers are arranged in a terminal raceme.

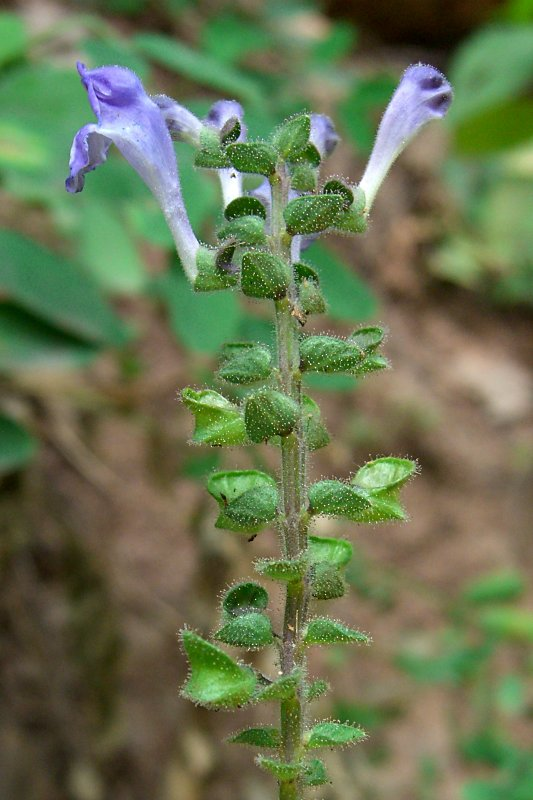
Detail of inflorescence

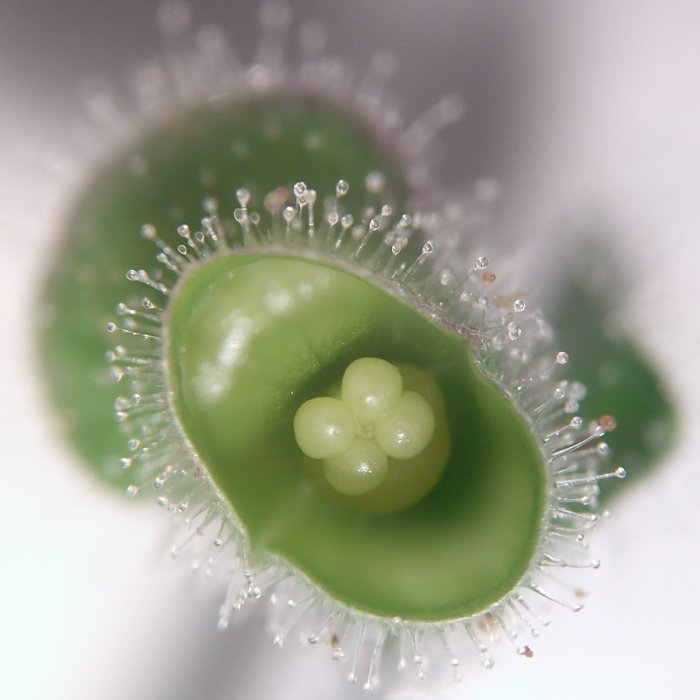
Calyx and ovary of Scutellaria ovata

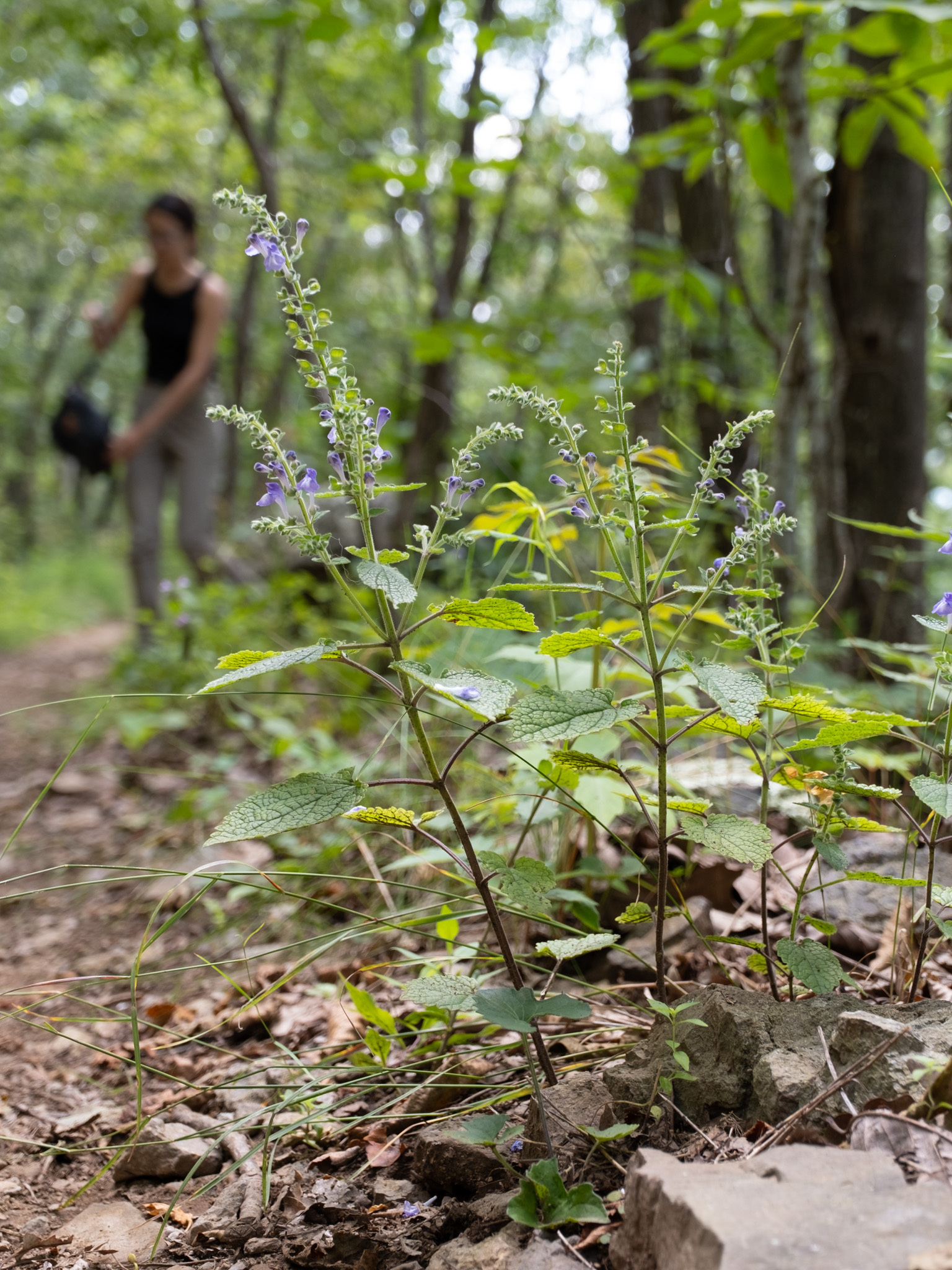
Plant habit

== Taxonomy ==
This species is highly variable across its range, with local races expressing distinct phenotypes. Numerous varieties and subspecies have been described, with wide variation of on what constitutes the best taxonomic treatment. In two extremes, botanist Carl Epling recognized twelve subspecies in his 1942 treatment, while T.M. Lane described S. ovata as a single polymorphic taxa with no distinguishable varieties in a 1986 publication.

A numerical analysis published in 1988 indicated that at least three subspecies showed statistically significant morphological separation. Some modern floras have recognized these three subspecies:

- S. ovata ssp. bracteata
- S. ovata ssp. ovata
- S. ovata ssp. rugosa

== Conservation ==
Scutellaria ovata has been ranked as globally "secure", the lowest level of conservation concern. However, it becomes locally rare at the edges of its natural range. It is currently listed as threatened in Minnesota. In Michigan, it was considered "probably extirpated" until in 2007 it was found in The Nature Conservancy's Ives Road Fen Preserve in Tecumseh, Michigan. This was the first documented occurrence of the species in Michigan since 1918.
