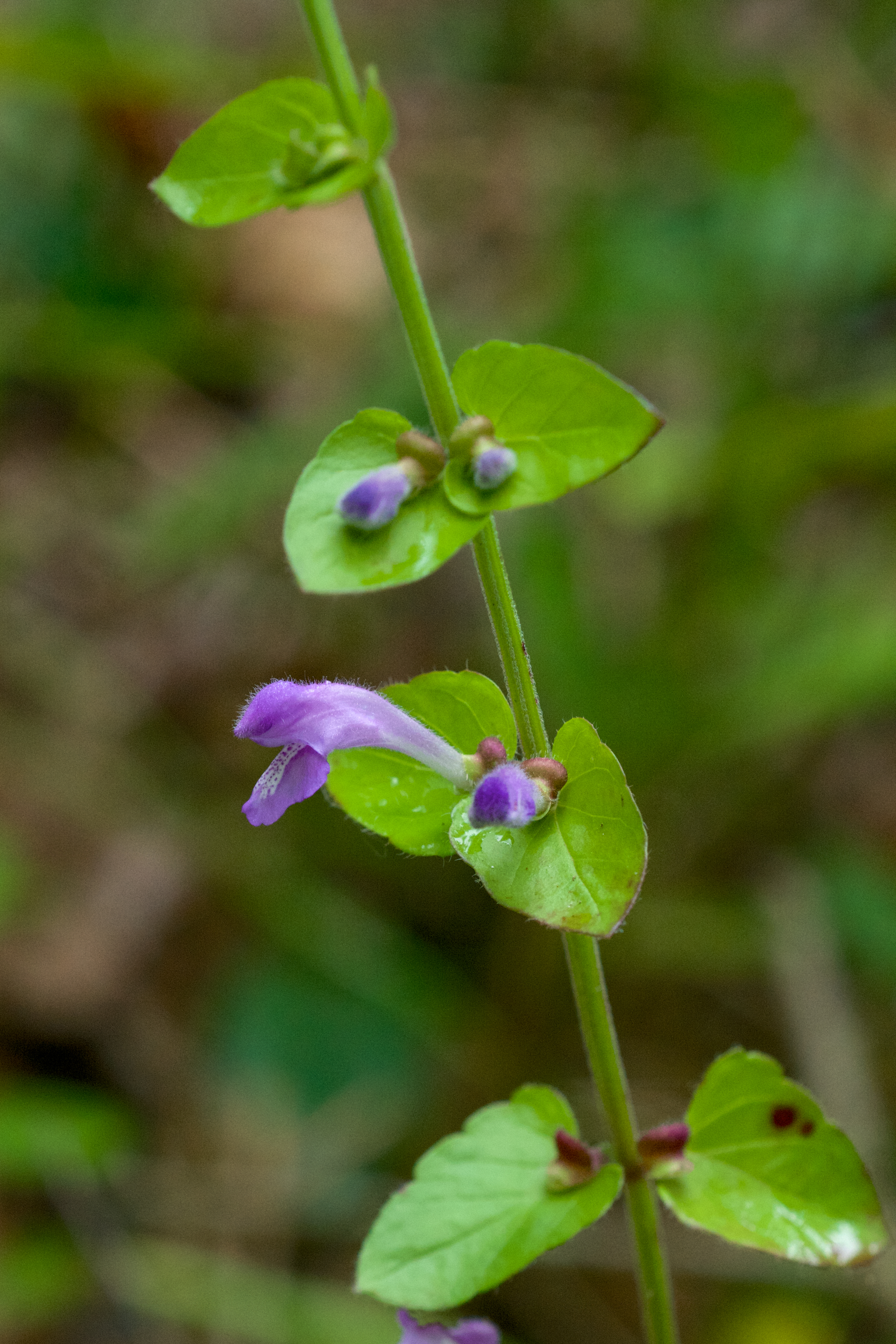

Conservation status
- Apparently Secure (NatureServe)

Scientific classification
- Kingdom: Plantae
- Clade: Tracheophytes
- Clade: Angiosperms
- Clade: Eudicots
- Clade: Asterids
- Order: Lamiales
- Family: Lamiaceae
- Genus: Scutellaria
- Species: S. cardiophylla

Binomial name
- Scutellaria cardiophylla Engelm. & A.Gray

= Scutellaria cardiophylla =

Plant species in the mint family

Scutellaria cardiophylla, known as gulf skullcap and heartleaf skullcap, is a species of flowering plant in the mint family. It is native to Texas, Louisiana, Arkansas, and Oklahoma; it is considered a rare/imperiled species across most of its range. Skullcaps get their name from (and are recognized by) their crested calyx.

Its habitat may be rocky or sandy soil in seepage areas, ancient fields, banks, grassy regions in open woodlands, and woodland edges.

== Taxonomy ==
Scutellaria cardiophylla is classified in the Scutellaria genus in family Lamiaceae. It was scientifically described and named by George Engelmann together with Asa Gray in 1845. It has no botanical synonyms, subspecies, or varieties.
