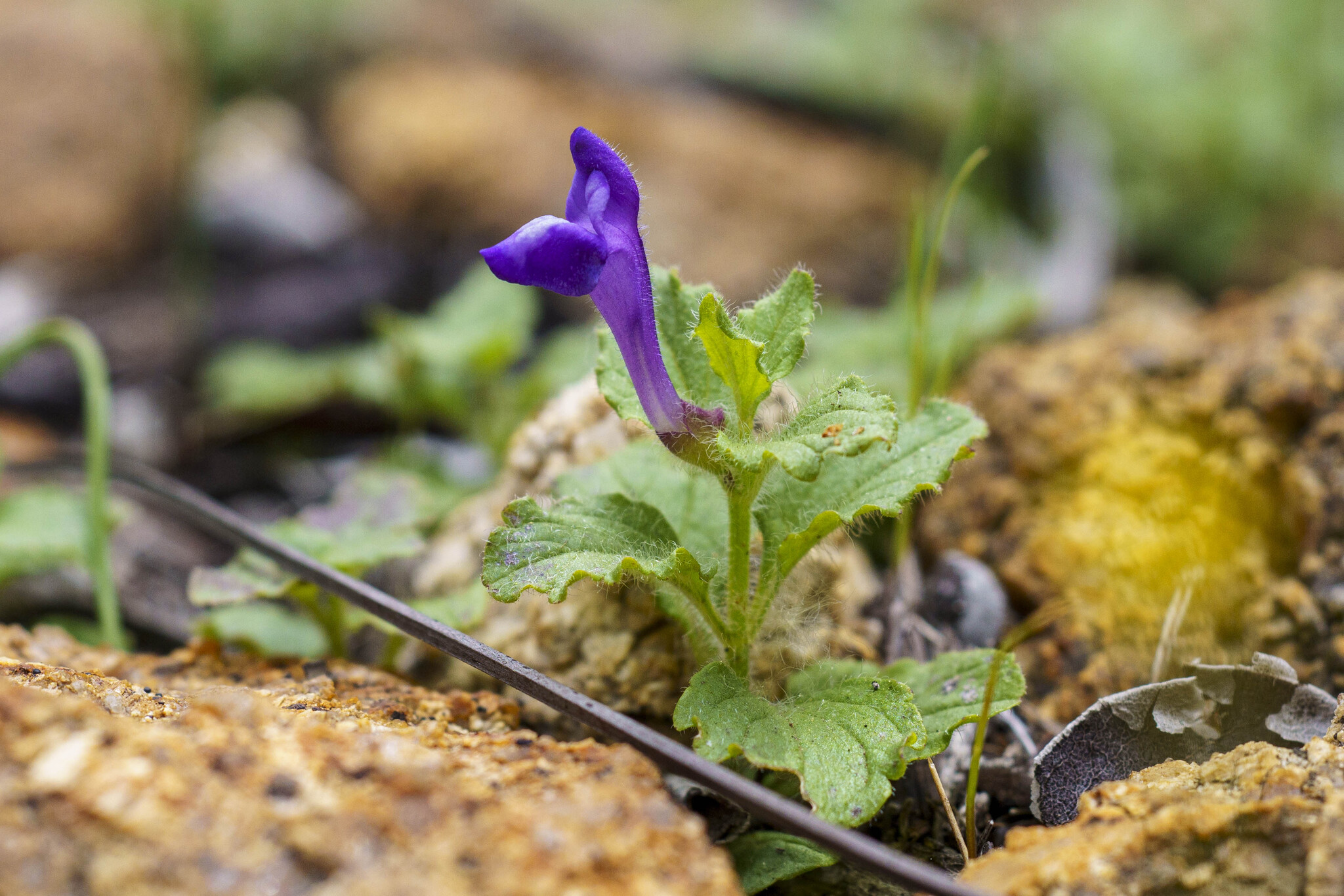

Scientific classification
- Kingdom: Plantae
- Clade: Tracheophytes
- Clade: Angiosperms
- Clade: Eudicots
- Clade: Asterids
- Order: Lamiales
- Family: Lamiaceae
- Genus: Scutellaria
- Species: S. tuberosa

Binomial name
- Scutellaria tuberosa Benth.

Synonyms
- Scutellaria pilosiuscula Nutt. ex Benth.; Scutellaria tuberosa var. similis Jeps.; Scutellaria tuberosa subsp. similis (Jeps.) Epling

= Scutellaria tuberosa =

Species of flowering plant

Scutellaria tuberosa is a species of perennial herb in the mint family commonly known as Danny's skullcap. A short, tuberous plant, it is characterized by violet-blue flowers when it is in bloom from March to July. It is native to western North America from Oregon through California to Baja California, where it is widespread throughout the mountain and coastal regions. It can be found in forest and woodland habitat, and a variety of open habitat types, often appearing in areas recently cleared by wildfire.

== Description ==
Scutellaria tuberosa is a perennial herb producing an erect stem or cluster of stems up to about 25 cm (9.8 in) tall from a root system with tubers. The stems are coated in short, spreading hairs 1–3 mm (0.039–0.118 in) long. The ovate leaves are oppositely arranged, and the lowest leaves are borne on short petioles 5–20 mm (0.20–0.79 in) long. Flowers emerge from the leaf axils, on pedicels 2–4 mm (0.079–0.157 in) long. Each flower is held in a calyx 4–5.5 mm (0.16–0.22 in) long with a transverse ridge on the upper calyx lip. The tubular corolla is 13–20 mm (0.51–0.79 in) long and violet-blue in color, with the lower lip covered in white patches or spots. The inner surface of the corolla can be glabrous to long-haired. The fruit is black.

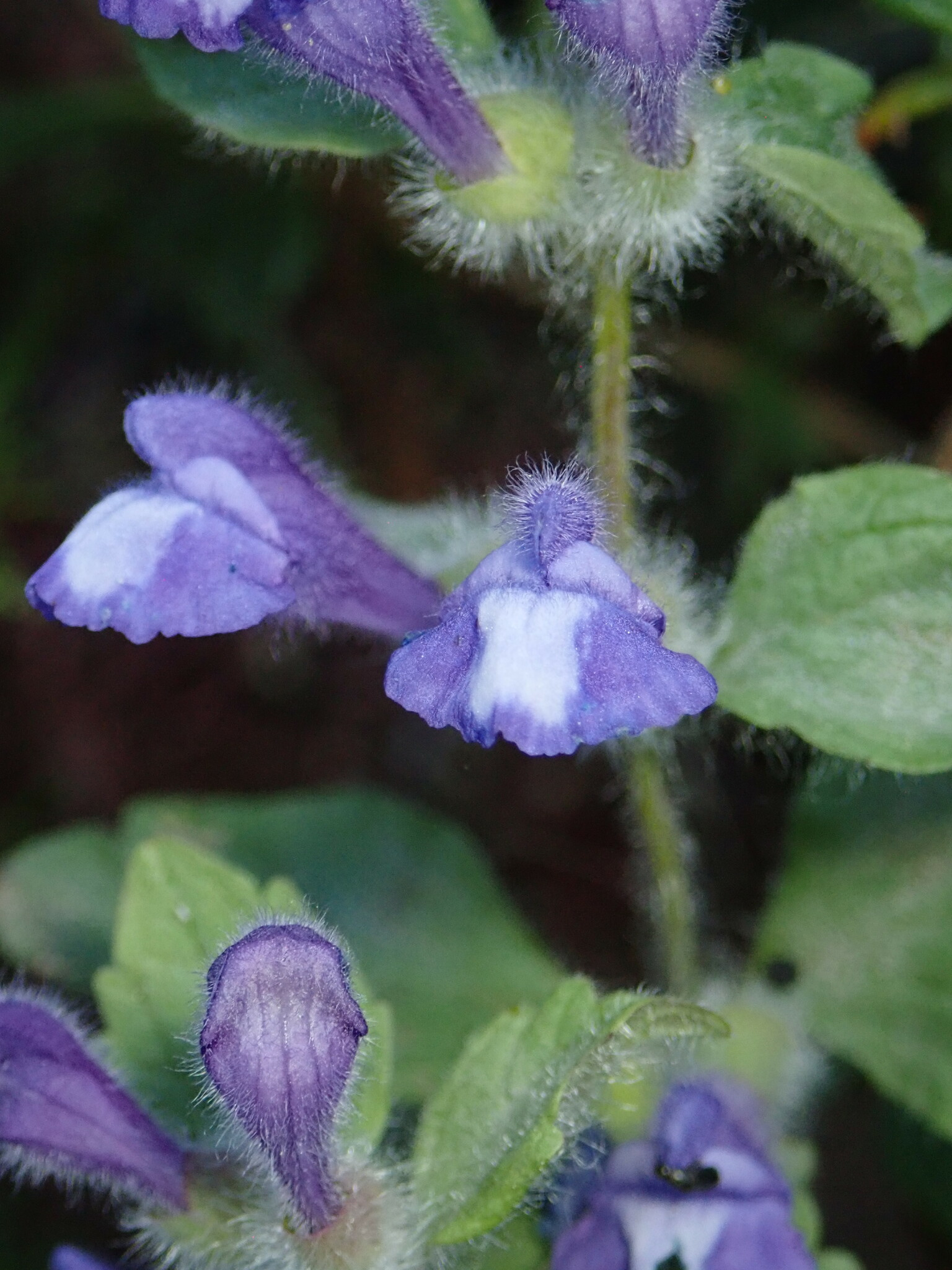
Detail of the flowers and inflorescence

== Taxonomy ==
Scutellaria tuberosa was first described by English botanist George Bentham in the 1834 publication Labiatarum Genera et Species, with the type specimen collected by David Douglas in 1833.

== Distribution and habitat ==
Scutellaria tuberosa is widely distributed across the California Floristic Province, from southern Oregon and most of California to northern Baja California. It is generally absent from the deserts of California, along with most of the Central Valley, except for the Sutter Buttes. It reaches its southern limit around the foothills of Ensenada in Baja California.

This plant is found in a wide variety of habitats below 1,450 m (4,760 ft). It is most commonly found in dry areas, chaparral, and oak woodland, and often appears in areas recently cleared by fire.
