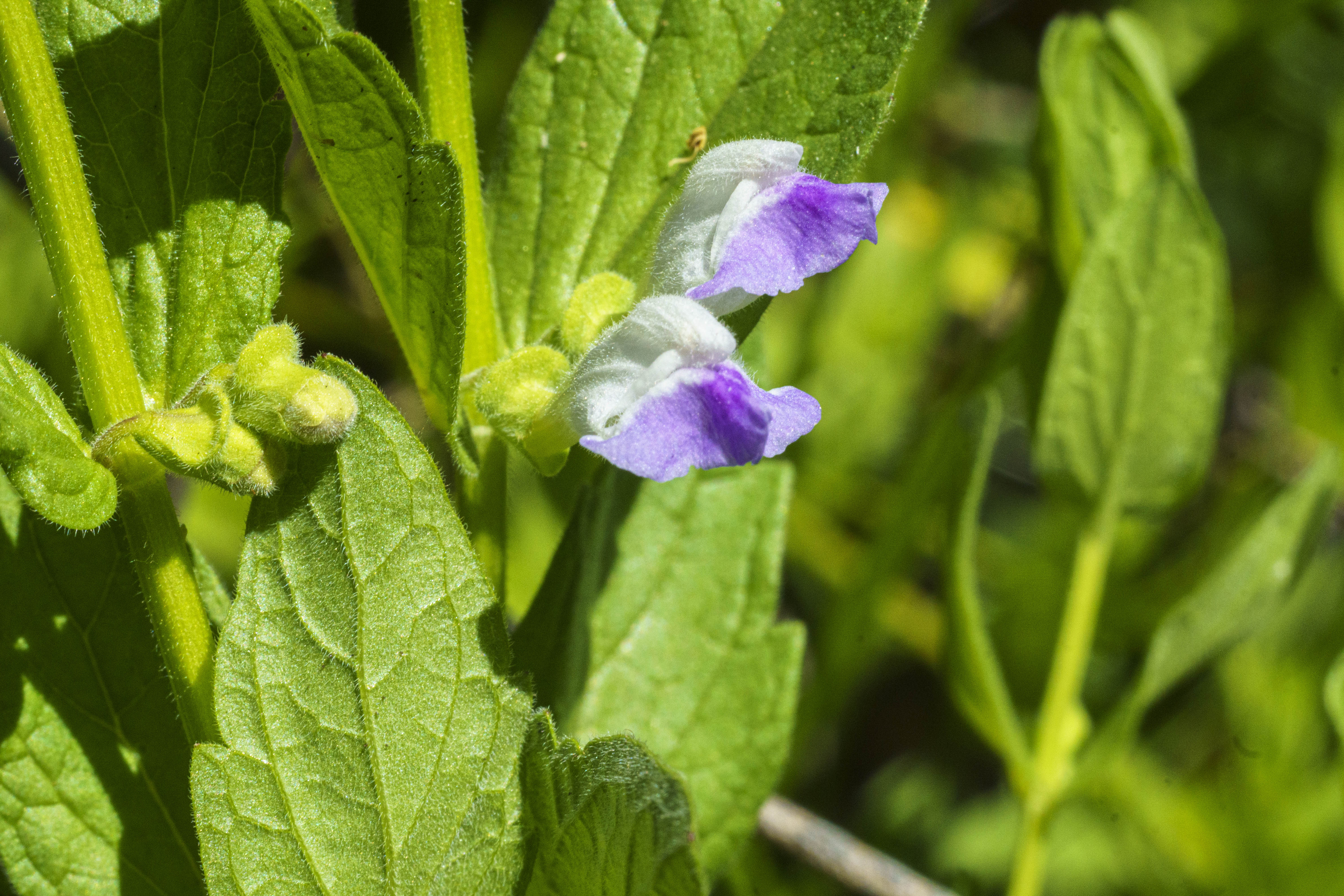
- Scutellaria bolanderi subsp. austromontana on Palomar Mountain.

Conservation status
- Apparently Secure (NatureServe)

Scientific classification
- Kingdom: Plantae
- Clade: Tracheophytes
- Clade: Angiosperms
- Clade: Eudicots
- Clade: Asterids
- Order: Lamiales
- Family: Lamiaceae
- Genus: Scutellaria
- Species: S. bolanderi

Binomial name
- Scutellaria bolanderi A.Gray

Synonyms
- Scutellaria bolanderi subsp. typica Epling

= Scutellaria bolanderi =

Species of flowering plant

Scutellaria bolanderi is a species of flowering plant in the mint family known by the common name Sierra skullcap. A rhizomatous perennial herb, it is endemic to California, where it is known from the Sierra Nevada, the Coast Ranges and several of the mountain ranges of Southern California. The northern and southern plants are divided into two subspecies.

== Description ==
Scutellaria bolanderi is a perennial herb producing an erect stem or cluster of stems 30 to 100 cm (12 to 39 in) tall from a system of slender rhizomes. The stems are coated 1–2 mm (0.039–0.079 in) long spreading hairs generally tipped with glands. The oval or heart-shaped leaves have wavy edges and are oppositely arranged. The lowest leaves are borne on short petioles 2–10 mm (0.079–0.394 in) long. Flowers emerge from the leaf axils. Each flower is held in a calyx of sepals with a large ridge or appendage on the upper part. The corolla is between 13–19 mm (0.51–0.75 in) long and tubular in shape with a large upper and lower lip. The upper lip is folded into a beaklike protrusion and the lower has three wide lobes. The corolla is white or very pale blue with an area of blue mottling on the lower lip. Flowering is typically from June to July.

== Taxonomy ==
Scutellaria bolanderi was first described by Asa Gray in 1868, from a specimen collected by Henry Nicholas Bolander in Mariposa County. It was later subdivided into two subspecies by Carl Epling, based on the differences in the size and coloring of the corolla between plants from the Sierra Nevada and southern California. Two subspecies are recognized:

- Scutellaria bolanderi subsp. bolanderi — Commonly known as Bolander's skullcap, this subspecies occurs in throughout the Sierra Nevada and along Uvas Creek in the Coast Ranges of Santa Clara County, California. It is characterized by leaves with a length 1–2 × their width, and a corolla 15–19 mm (0.59–0.75 in) long.
- Scutellaria bolanderi subsp. austromontana Epling— Commonly known as the southern mountains skullcap, this subspecies is native to the Peninsular Ranges and San Bernardino Mountains in Southern California, as well as the Mojave River. It is characterized by leaves with a length over 2 × their width, and a corolla 12–14 mm (0.47–0.55 in) long.

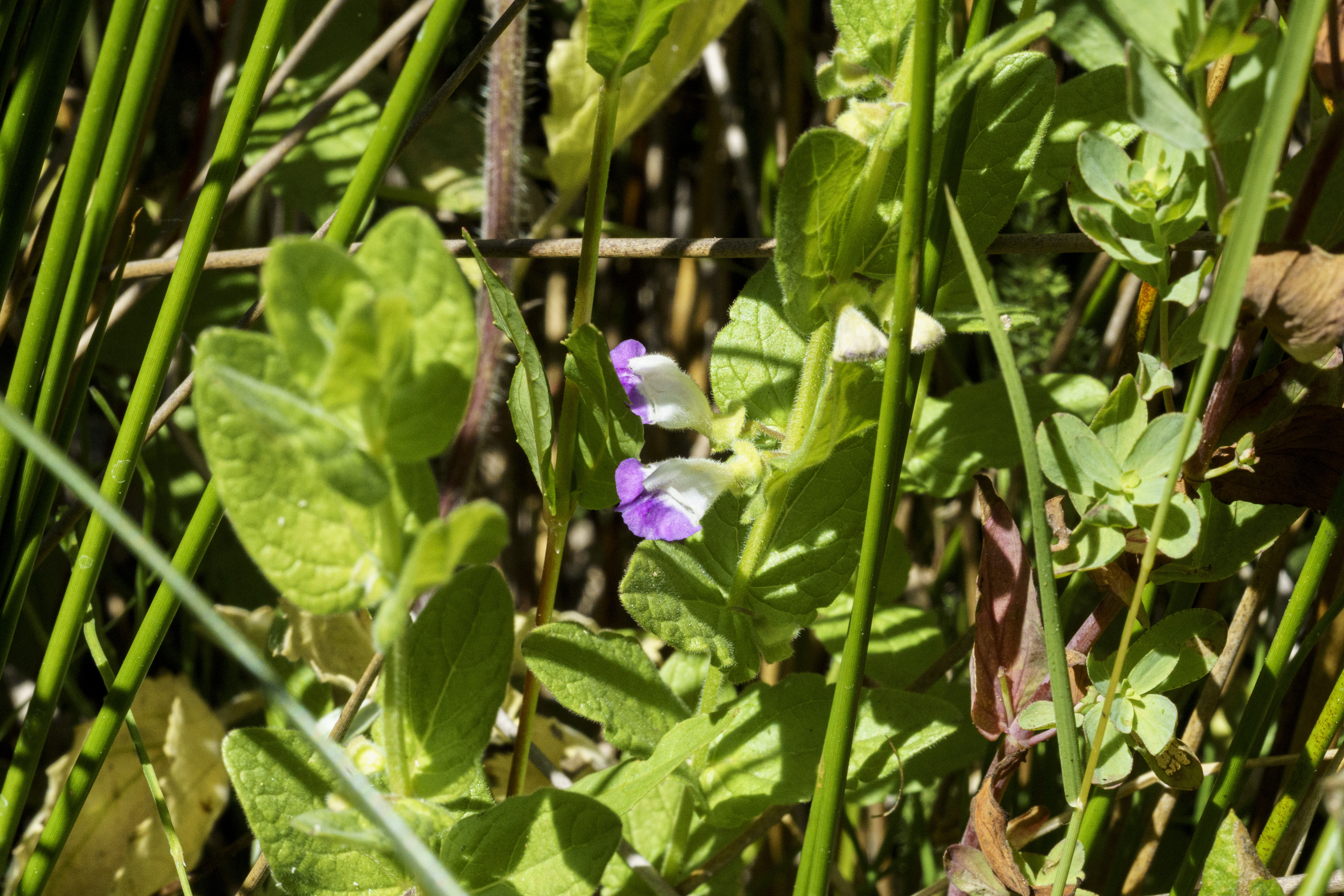
The southern mountains skullcap at Doane Valley on Palomar Mountain, San Diego County.

== Distribution and habitat ==
Scutellaria bolanderi is endemic to the state of California. It is known from the Sierra Nevada, part of the Coast Ranges, and some of the mountains of Southern California, along with parts of the Mojave Desert. Epling notes that although the species ranges widely throughout the state, it is highly localized.

It is typically found in wet meadows and along the margins of streams, in montane habitats usually with pine or oak woodland. Subspecies austromontana is found at elevations of 600 to 2,000 m (2,000 to 6,600 ft), while subsp. bolanderi is found at elevations of 100 to 1,500 m (330 to 4,920 ft).
