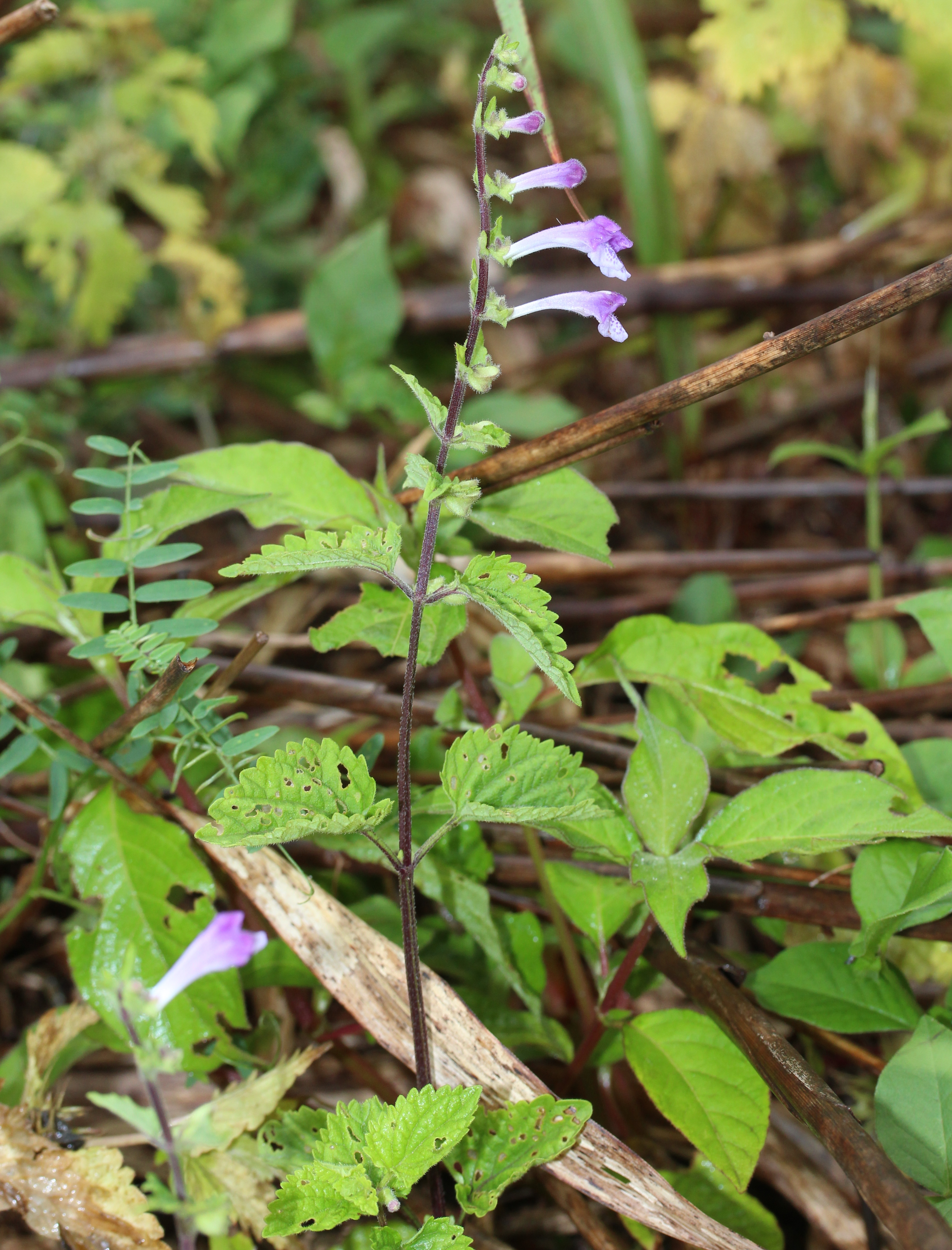
- Scutellaria pekinensis

Scientific classification
- Kingdom: Plantae
- Clade: Embryophytes
- Clade: Tracheophytes
- Clade: Spermatophytes
- Clade: Angiosperms
- Clade: Eudicots
- Clade: Asterids
- Order: Lamiales
- Family: Lamiaceae
- Subfamily: Scutellarioideae
- Genus: Scutellaria; L.

Synonyms
- Anaspis Rech.f.; Cruzia Phil.; Harlanlewisia Epling; Perilomia Kunth; Salazaria Torr.; Theresa Clos

= Scutellaria =

Genus of flowering plants

Scutellaria is a genus of flowering plants in the mint family, Lamiaceae. They are known commonly as skullcaps. The generic name is derived from the Latin scutella, meaning "a small dish, tray or platter", or "little dish", referring to the shape of the calyx. The common name alludes to the resemblance of the same structure to "miniature medieval helmets". The genus has a subcosmopolitan distribution, with species occurring nearly worldwide, mainly in temperate regions.

== Description ==
Most Scutellaria are annual or perennial herbaceous plants from 5 to 100 cm (2 to 39 in) tall, however a few are subshrubs. Some Scutellaria are aquatic. Scutellaria have four-angled stems and opposite leaves, and flowers with upper and lower lips. The genus is most easily recognized by the typical shield on the calyx that has also prompted its common name.

== Traditional use ==
Skullcaps are used in traditional medicine, such as in traditional Chinese medicine. The root of Scutellaria baicalensis – a common component of many preparations – is marketed in volumes that have led to the overexploitation of the wild plant. Its rarity has led to an increase in price, and encouraged the adulteration of the product with other species of Scutellaria.

In 1773, Scutellaria lateriflora became a common treatment in North America for the hysteria and hydrophobia caused by rabies. Today it is still a popular medicinal herb. It is widely available as a commercial product used in western herbalism. The plant reportedly commands prices of $16 to $64 per pound dry weight.

== Constituents ==
The main compounds in skullcap are flavonoids. Isolated chemical compounds include wogonin, wogonoside, and 3,5,7,2',6'-pentahydroxyl flavanone found in Scutellaria. Other constituents include baicalin, apigenin, oroxylin A, and scutellarein.

== Selected species ==
Estimates of the number of species in the genus range from around 300 to about 350 or 360 to 470.

Selected species include:

- Scutellaria alabamensis – Alabama skullcap
- Scutellaria albida
- Scutellaria alborosea Lem.
- Scutellaria alpina L. – alpine skullcap
- Scutellaria altamaha – pineland skullcap
- Scutellaria altissima L. – Somerset skullcap, tall skullcap
- Scutellaria amoena
- Scutellaria anatolica
- Scutellaria angustifolia – narrowleaf skullcap
- Scutellaria antirrhinoides Benth. – nose skullcap
- Scutellaria arenicola – Florida scrub skullcap
- Scutellaria arguta – Blue Ridge skullcap
- Scutellaria atriplicifolia
- Scutellaria aurata
- Scutellaria baicalensis Georgi – Baikal skullcap, Chinese skullcap
- Scutellaria barbata D.Don – barbed skullcap
- Scutellaria bolanderi A.Gray – Sierra skullcap
- Scutellaria brachyspica
- Scutellaria brittonii – Britton's skullcap
- Scutellaria bushii – Bush's skullcap
- Scutellaria caerulea – blue skullcap
- Scutellaria californica A.Gray – California skullcap
- Scutellaria cardiophylla – gulf skullcap
- Scutellaria columnae
- Scutellaria costaricana H.Wendl. – scarlet skullcap, Costa Rican skullcap
- Scutellaria drummondii – Drummond's skullcap
- Scutellaria elliptica Muhl. – hairy skullcap
- Scutellaria floridana Chapm. – Florida skullcap
- Scutellaria formosana
- Scutellaria galericulata L. – common skullcap, marsh skullcap
- Scutellaria glabriuscula – Georgia skullcap
- Scutellaria hastifolia – spear-leaved skullcap
- Scutellaria havanensis – Havana skullcap
- Scutellaria hirta
- Scutellaria hookeri
- Scutellaria humilis
- Scutellaria incana Biehler – downy skullcap, hoary skullcap
- Scutellaria incarnata Vent.
- Scutellaria indica L.
- Scutellaria integrifolia L. – helmet flower
- Scutellaria laevis – Culberson County skullcap
- Scutellaria lateriflora L. – blue skullcap, Virginian skullcap
- Scutellaria longifolia Benth.
- Scutellaria longituba
- Scutellaria meehanioides
- Scutellaria mexicana
- Scutellaria microphylla – littleleaf skullcap
- Scutellaria minor Huds. – lesser skullcap
- Scutellaria montana Chapm. – mountain skullcap, large-flowered skullcap
- Scutellaria multiglandulosa – Small's skullcap
- Scutellaria muriculata – Rio Grande skullcap
- Scutellaria nana A.Gray – dwarf skullcap
- Scutellaria nervosa – veiny skullcap
- Scutellaria novae-zelandaie
- Scutellaria ocmulgee – Ocmulgee skullcap
- Scutellaria orientalis
- Scutellaria ovata Hill – heart-leaved skullcap
- Scutellaria parvula Michx. – small skullcap
- Scutellaria pekinensis
- Scutellaria potosina – Mexican skullcap
- Scutellaria pseudoserrata – falseteeth skullcap
- Scutellaria purpurascens
- Scutellaria racemosa – South American skullcap
- Scutellaria rehderiana
- Scutellaria resinosa Torr. – sticky skullcap
- Scutellaria rubicunda
- Scutellaria sapphirina – White Pine skullcap
- Scutellaria sarmentosa
- Scutellaria saxatilis – smooth rock skullcap
- Scutellaria serboana
- Scutellaria serrata – showy skullcap
- Scutellaria siphocampyloides – grayleaf skullcap
- Scutellaria splendens
- Scutellaria strigillosa
- Scutellaria suffrutescens
- Scutellaria texana – Texas skullcap
- Scutellaria thieretii – Thieret's skullcap
- Scutellaria tuberosa Benth. – Danny's skullcap
- Scutellaria utriculata
- Scutellaria valdiviana
- Scutellaria ventenatii
- Scutellaria violacea
- Scutellaria viscidula
- Scutellaria wrightii – Wright's skullcap

== See also ==
- Piper methysticum
- Valeriana officinalis (valerian)
- Chaenomeles speciosa
