= C15H10O5 =

The chemical formula C_{15}H_{10}O_{5} (molar mass : 270.23 g/mol, exact mass : 270.052823) may refer to:

- Trihydroxyflavones:
  - Apigenin (5,7,4'-trihydroxyflavone)
  - Baicalein (5,6,7-trihydroxyflavone)
  - Galangin (3,5,7-trihydroxyflavone)
  - Norwogonin (5,7,8-Trihydroxyflavone)
  - 7,8,3'-Trihydroxyflavone
  - 6,7,4'-Trihydroxyflavone
- Aloe emodin, an anthraquinone
- Emodin, a purgative resin
- Genistein, an isoflavone
- Morindone, an anthraquinone dye
- Thunberginol A, an isocoumarin
- Thunberginol F, a natural benzofuran

== See also ==
- List of compounds with carbon number 15
