= Trihydroxyflavone =

Molecular structure of the flavone backbone with numbers

Trihydroxyflavone may refer to:

- Apigenin (5,7,4'-trihydroxyflavone)
- Baicalein (5,6,7-trihydroxyflavone)
- Norwogonin (5,7,8-Trihydroxyflavone)
- Galangin (3,5,7-trihydroxyflavone)
- 7,8,3'-Trihydroxyflavone (7,8,3'-THF)
- 6,7,4'-Trihydroxyflavone (6,7,4'-THF)
