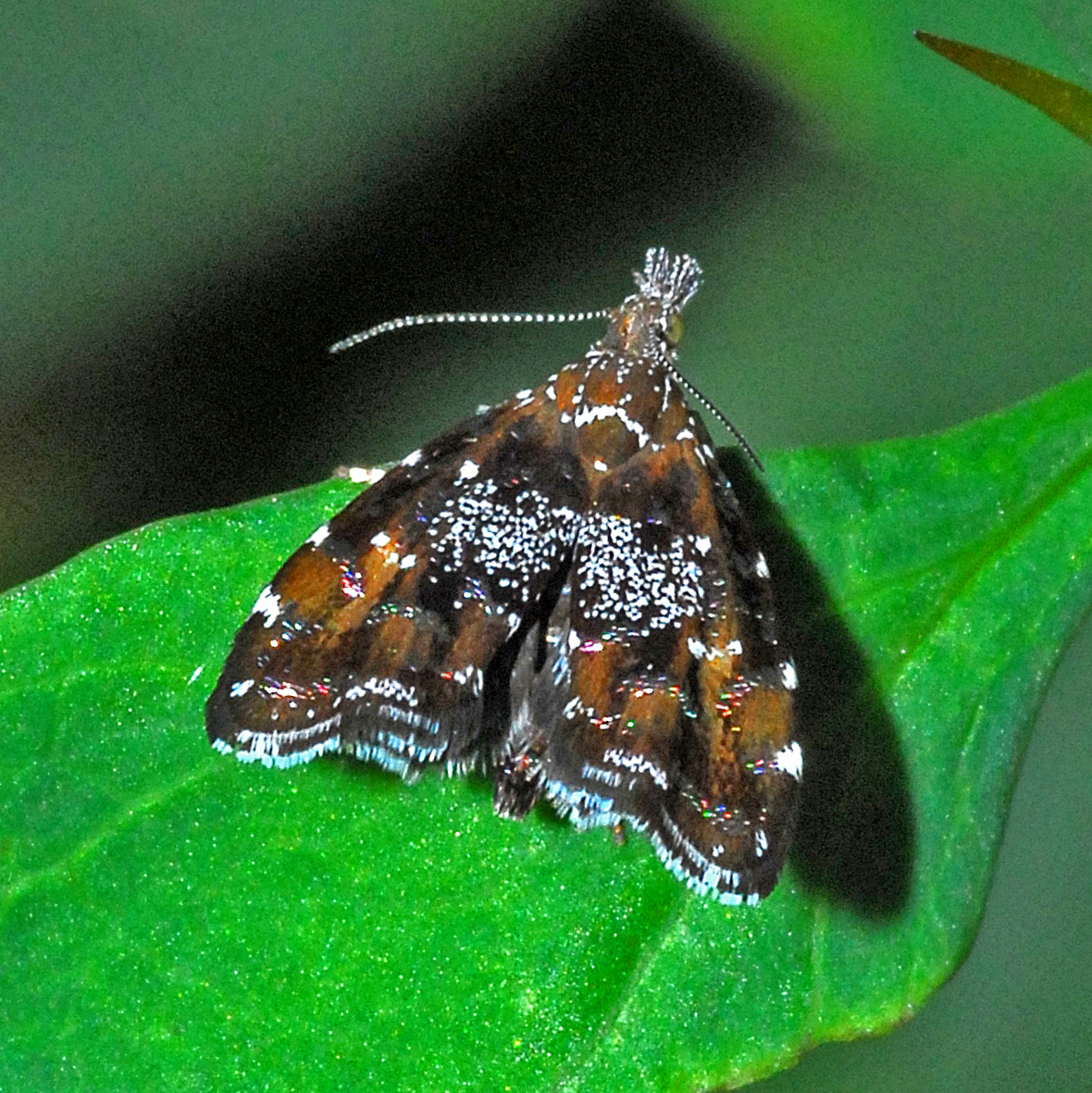
- Prochoreutis myllerana. Dorsal view

Scientific classification
- Kingdom: Animalia
- Phylum: Arthropoda
- Clade: Pancrustacea
- Class: Insecta
- Order: Lepidoptera
- Family: Choreutidae
- Genus: Prochoreutis
- Species: P. myllerana

Binomial name
- Prochoreutis myllerana (Fabricius, 1794)

Synonyms
- List: Phalaena argentinetta Fourcroy, 1785 (nomen oblitum); Prochoreutis argentinetta; Pyralis myllerana Fabricius, 1794; Pyralis scopoliana sensu Panzer, 1801; Anthophila mylleri Haworth, [1811]; Tortrix augustana Hübner, [1813]; Choreutis scintilulana Hübner, [1825]; Choreutis scintilulalis Treitschke, 1835; Choreutis albipunctalis Zetterstedt, [1839]; Choreutis müllerana von Heyden, 1865; Choreutis myllerana; Tortrix angustana Duponchel, 1842; Xylopoda scintilulana Hübner, [1825];Godart & Duponchel, 1842; Xylopoda myllerana (Fabricius, 1794);Duponchel, 1834; Simaethis myllerana (Fabricius, 1794);Wood & Westwood, 1854; Porpe myllerana (Fabricius, 1794);Caradja, 1920

= Prochoreutis myllerana =

Species of moth

Prochoreutis myllerana, Miller’s nettle-tap or small metal-mark, is a moth of the family Choreutidae found in Asia and Europe. Miller's nettle-tap was first described by Johan Christian Fabricius in 1794 from a specimen found in Sweden.

== Distribution ==
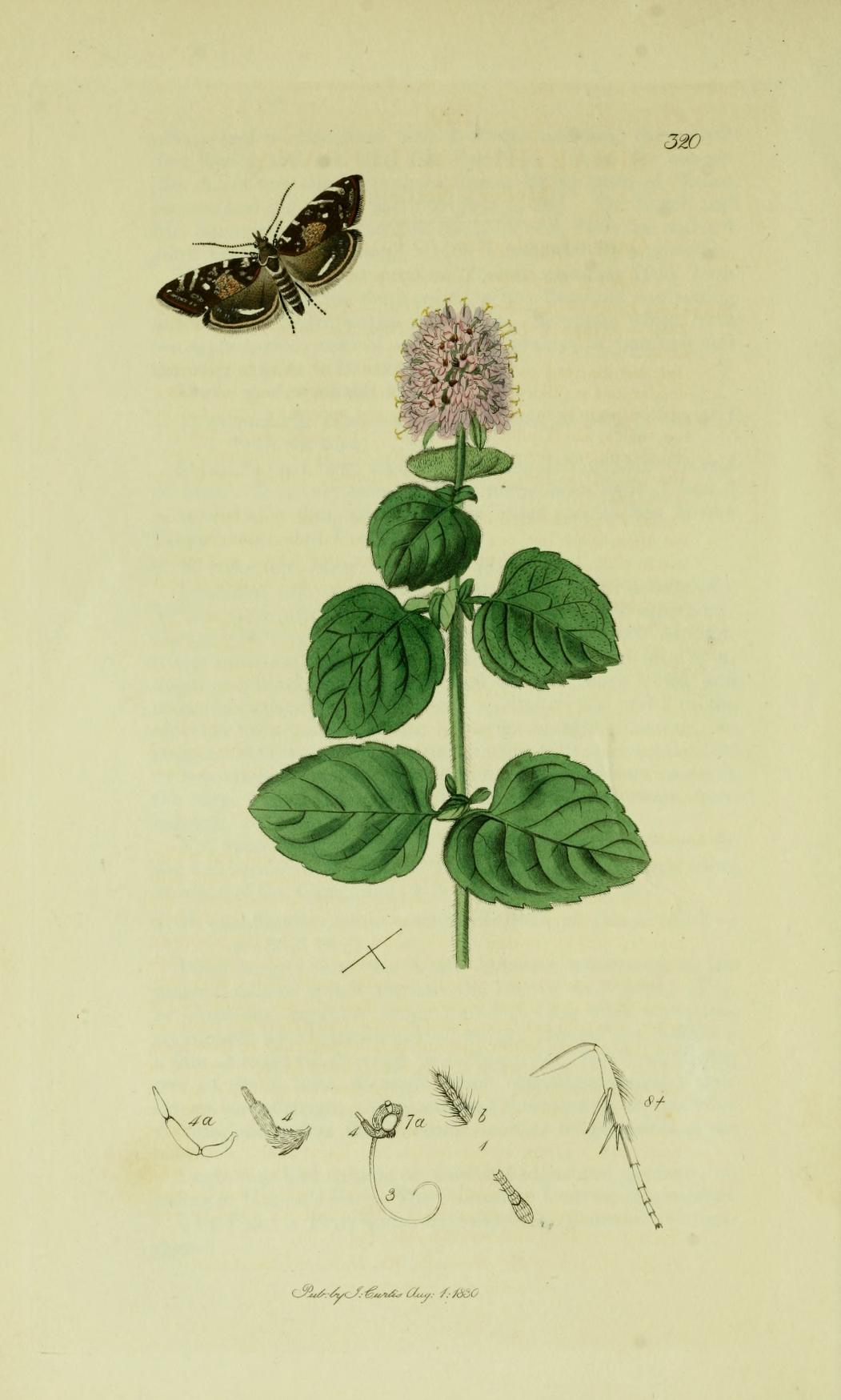
Illustration from John Curtis's British Entomology Volume 6

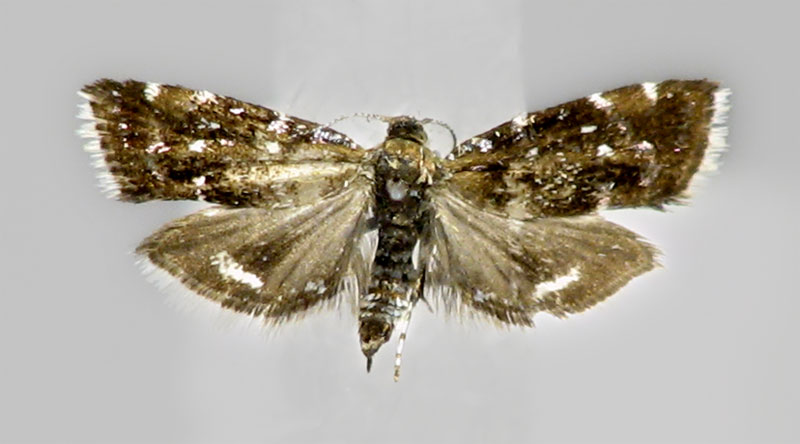
Mounted specimen

This species can be found in most of Europe, east into Russia. It is also known from China (Heilongjiang, Xinjiang), Korea and Japan (Hokkaido).

== Description ==
The wingspan of Prochoreutis myllerana can reach 10–14 mm. Forewings are variegated brown, with a dark brown median fascia showing white dusting. These moths are characterized by 2 + 2 white dots on the upper part of the wings, near the edge.

Prochoreutis myllerana is very similar to Prochoreutis sehestediana, but in the latter the white dusting extends more than half way towards the costa of the forewings and the mentioned 2 + 2 white dots are missing. The apex of P. sehestediana is more pointed. Moreover in P. myllerana, the head of a larva is uniformly pale brown, contrary to Prochoreutis sehedestediana.

== Biology ==
Adults are on wing from May to early September. There are probably three generations per year. The monophagous larvae feed on common skullcap (Scutellaria galericulata) and lesser skullcap (Scutellaria minor). The young larvae mine the lower leaves of their host plant, older larvae live free among spun leaves. There are also records on white dead-nettle (Lamium album) and red dead-nettle (Lamium purpureum), but these need confirmation. Full grown larvae can be found in June, and in July and August. The pupa forms in a dense white, spindle-shaped cocoon (circa 10 mm long), in a folded leaf. Probably these moths hibernate as adults.
