= Oroxylin A =

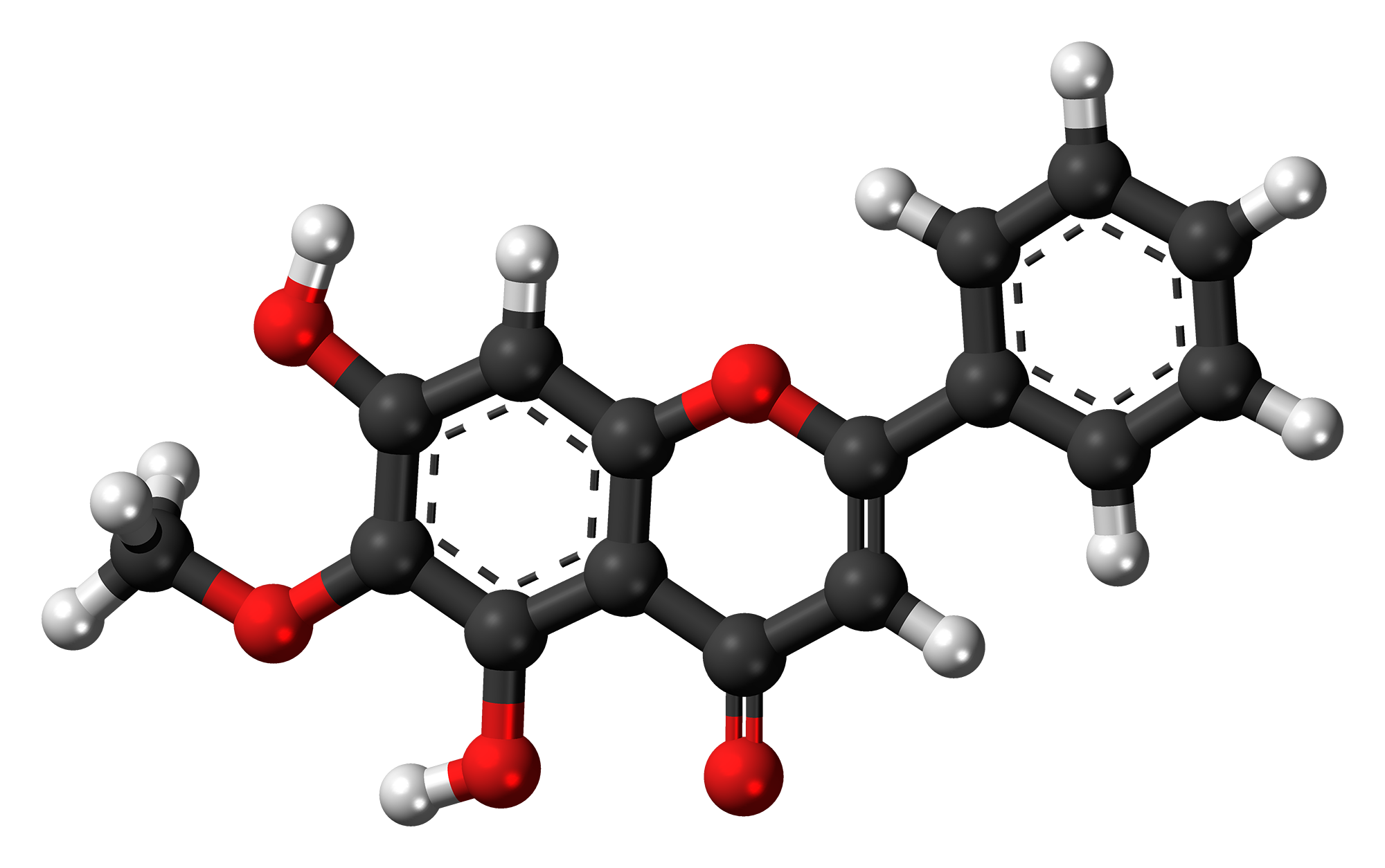

Names
- IUPAC name 5,7-Dihydroxy-6-methoxyflavone
- Systematic IUPAC name 5,7-Dihydroxy-6-methoxy-2-phenyl-4H-1-benzopyran-4-one
- Other names Baicalein 6-methyl ether

Identifiers
CAS Number	480-11-5
3D model (JSmol)	Interactive image
ChEBI	CHEBI:61668
ChemSpider	4478428
ECHA InfoCard	100.189.623
KEGG	C22603
PubChem CID	5320315
UNII	53K24Z586G
CompTox Dashboard (EPA)	DTXSID70197375
- InChI: InChI=1S/C16H12O5/c1-20-16-11(18)8-13-14(15(16)19)10(17)7-12(21-13)9-5- 3-2-4-6-9/h2-8,18-19H,1H3 Key: LKOJGSWUMISDOF-UHFFFAOYSA-N
- SMILES: COC1=C(C=C2C(=C1O)C(=O)C=C(O2)C3=CC=CC=C3)O

Properties
Chemical formula	C_{16}H_{12}O_{5}
Molar mass	284.26 g/mol
- Except where otherwise noted, data are given for materials in their standard state (at 25 °C [77 °F], 100 kPa). verify (what is ?) Infobox references

Oroxylin A is an O-methylated flavone, a chemical compound that can be found in the medicinal plants Scutellaria baicalensis and Scutellaria lateriflora, and the Oroxylum indicum tree. It has demonstrated activity as a dopamine reuptake inhibitor, and is also a negative allosteric modulator of the benzodiazepine site of the GABA_{A} receptor. Oroxylin A has been found to improve memory consolidation in mice by elevating brain-derived neurotrophic factor (BDNF) levels in the hippocampus.

== See also ==
- Baicalin
- Baicalein
- Chaenomeles speciosa
- Urolithin A
- 5,7-Dihydroxy-6-methoxy-2-(4-phenoxyphenyl)chromen-4-one
