= Baicalein 7-O-glucuronosyltransferase =

Class of enzymes

Identifiers
- EC no.: 2.4.1.253

Databases
- IntEnz: IntEnz view
- BRENDA: BRENDA entry
- ExPASy: NiceZyme view
- KEGG: KEGG entry
- MetaCyc: metabolic pathway
- PRIAM: profile
- PDB structures: RCSB PDB PDBe PDBsum
Search
- PMC: articles
- PubMed: articles
- NCBI: proteins

Baicalein 7-O-glucuronosyltransferase (EC 2.4.1.253, UBGAT) is an enzyme with systematic name UDP-D-glucuronate:5,6,7-trihydroxyflavone 7-O-glucuronosyltransferase . It catalyses the following chemical reaction

baicalein
+ UDP-glucuronate
UDP
baicalin

The enzyme characterised from Scutellaria baicalensis transfers a glucuronic acid sugar unit from UDP-glucuronate to the flavone, baicalein, specifically at the phenolic hydroxy group at the 7-position.
