= Shuanghuanglian =

Traditional Chinese medicine

Shuanghuanglian (Chinese: 双黄连) is a Chinese patent medicine with a long history for treating respiratory tract infection in China. Some of its active ingredients are Wogonin, Baicalin and baicalein. It is derived from three Chinese herbal medicines, namely, Japanese honeysuckle (Lonicera japonica Thunb.), Baikal skullcap (Scutellaria baicalensis Georgi), and weeping forsythia (Forsythia suspensa (Thunb.) Vahl). It has been used for the treatment of acute respiratory tract infections since 1973. Several forms are described in the Chinese Pharmacopoeia.

== Recent history ==
In July 2020, Su et al reported on an in vitro experiment of its effect on COVID-19. Following the release of the report, which was in part supported by the Jack Ma Foundation, there was an uptick in Shuanghuanglian sales.

During the COVID-19 pandemic, the Xinhua News Agency claimed that the herbal product “shuanghuanglian” can prevent or treat infections from coronaviruses, stimulating sales across the United States, Russia, and China. However, the clinical studies on its effectiveness have been inconclusive. Su et al. published a report that the herbal substance has been shown in vitro to be cytotoxic "against a clinical isolate of SARS-CoV-2". However, another government media outlet, People’s Daily, published a contrasting report urging citizens not to purchase the herbal remedy as it had not been recommended for coronavirus antiviral treatment and treatment measures had not passed clinical trials.
