= Scutellarin =

- 7-(beta-D-Glucopyranuronosyloxy)-5,6-dihydroxy-2-(4-hydroxyphenyl)-4H-1-benzopyran-4-one

Names
- IUPAC name 4′,5,6-Trihydroxy-4-oxoflav-2-en-7-yl β-D-glucopyranosiduronic acid
- Systematic IUPAC name (2S,3S,4S,5R,6S)-6-{[5,6-Dihydroxy-2-(4-hydroxyphenyl)-4-oxo-4H-1-benzopyran-7-yl]oxy}-3,4,5-trihydroxyoxane-2-carboxylic acid
- Other names Breviscapine; Breviscapin; Scutellarein-7-glucuronide; Scutellarein-7beta-D-glucuronide; Scutellarein-7beta-D-glucuronoside; Scutellarein-7-O-beta-D-glucuronide; 7-(β-D-glucopyranuronosyloxy)-5,6-dihydroxy-2-(4-hydroxyphenyl)-4H-1-benzopyran-4-one

Identifiers
CAS Number	27740-01-8
3D model (JSmol)	Interactive image
ChEBI	CHEBI:61278
ChEMBL	ChEMBL487805
ChemSpider	161366
PubChem CID	185617
UNII	16IGP0ML9A
CompTox Dashboard (EPA)	DTXSID101336184 DTXSID60921924, DTXSID101336184
- InChI: InChI=1S/C21H18O12/c22-8-3-1-7(2-4-8)10-5-9(23)13-11(31-10)6-12(14(24)15(13)25)32-21-18(28)16(26)17(27)19(33-21)20(29)30/h1-6,16-19,21-22,24-28H,(H,29,30)/t16-,17-,18+,19-,21+/m0/s1 Key: DJSISFGPUUYILV-ZFORQUDYSA-N
- SMILES: O=C3\C=C(/Oc2cc(O[C@@H]1O[C@H](C(=O)O)[C@@H](O)[C@H](O)[C@H]1O)c(O)c(O)c23)c4ccc(O)cc4

Properties
Chemical formula	C_{21}H_{18}O_{12}
Molar mass	462.36 g/mol

Hazards
- Lethal dose or concentration (LD, LC)
LD_{50} (median dose)	1314 mg/kg (mouse, intravenous)
- Except where otherwise noted, data are given for materials in their standard state (at 25 °C [77 °F], 100 kPa). Infobox references

Scutellarin is a flavone, a type of phenolic chemical compound. It can be found in the Asian "barbed skullcap" Scutellaria barbata and the North American plant S. lateriflora both of which have been used in traditional medicine. The compound is found only in trace amounts in the "Chinese skullcap" Scutellaria baicalensis, another plant used in traditional Chinese medicine.

The determination of the structure of scutellarin took Guido Goldschmiedt many years: after the first publication on that topic in 1901, only in 1910 did he managed to obtain enough starting material for more detailed studies.

== Formation ==
A glucuronosyltransferase enzyme converts scutellarein to its glucuronide by adding a sugar acid at a specific phenolic hydroxy group, with uridine diphosphate (UDP) as byproduct:

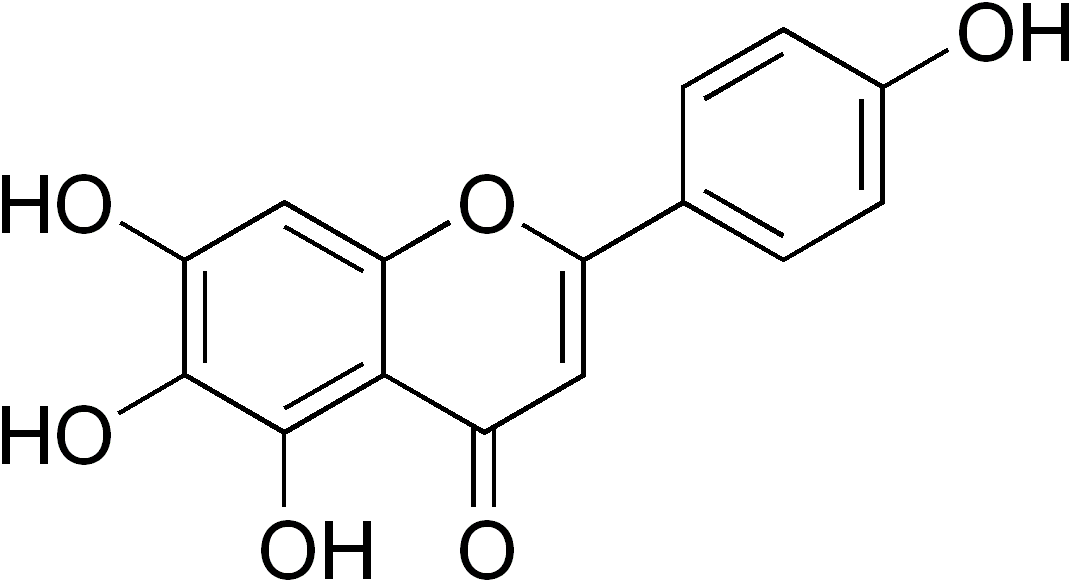
scutellarein
+ UDP-glucuronate
UDP
scutellarin

== Properties ==
Scutellarin has anticancer properties. It has been found to induce apoptosis of ovarian and breast tumor cells in vitro. One mechanism of scutellarin's antitumor action is to bind to TNF receptor II (TNFR2) in tumor-associated CD4+Foxp3+ regulatory T cells. These tumor "helper" cells show high expression of TNFR2 and are inhibited when it is blocked by scutellarin.

Scutellarin also shows protective effects for nerve cells that are affected by estrogen.

Scutellarin has been shown as a potential treatment for diabetic retinopathy, which could prevent diabetic blindness. In laboratory studies, scutellarin inhibits hypoxia-induced and moderately high glucose-induced proliferation and vascular endothelial growth factor (VEGF) expression in human retinal endothelial cells; thus, it could be a potential therapy for diabetic retinopathy. However, how scutellarin inhibits VEGF is unknown.

Scutellarin has anti-HIV-1 effects as well. In laboratory studies, a drug-resistant type HIV-1 cell-to-cell infection was inhibited with significant potency. The scutellarin compound was found to inhibit several strains of HIV-1 replication with different potencies, by preventing HIV-1 particle attachment and cell fusion, as well as inhibiting HIV-1 retransmission.
