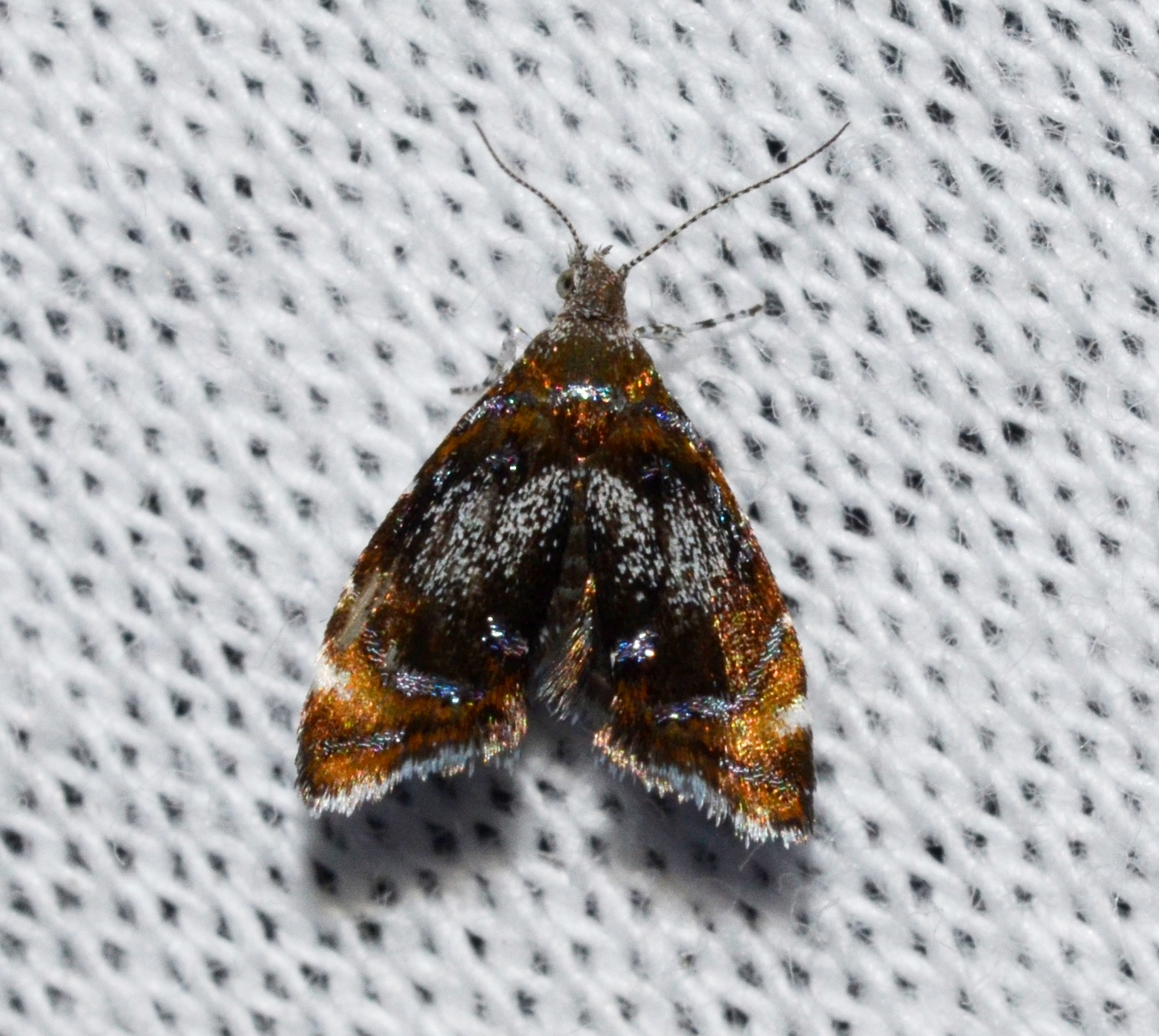

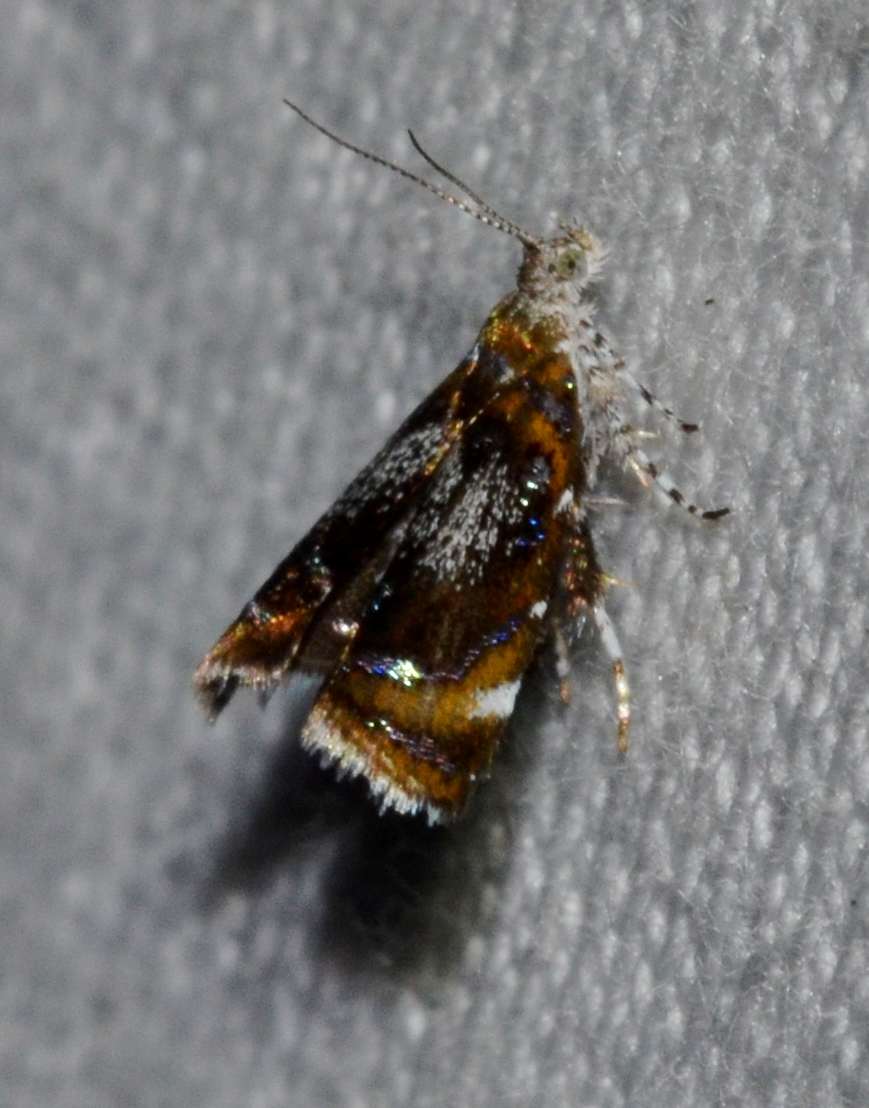

Scientific classification
- Kingdom: Animalia
- Phylum: Arthropoda
- Clade: Pancrustacea
- Class: Insecta
- Order: Lepidoptera
- Family: Choreutidae
- Genus: Prochoreutis
- Species: P. inflatella

Binomial name
- Prochoreutis inflatella (Clemens, 1863)

Synonyms
- Choreutis inflatella Clemens, 1863

= Prochoreutis inflatella =

Species of moth

Prochoreutis inflatella, the skullcap skeletonizer moth, is a moth of the family Choreutidae. It is found in eastern North America.

The wingspan is 9–11 mm.

Adults are on wing from June to September. There are several generations per year.

The larvae feed on Scutellaria species, including Scutellaria lateriflora. The first larvae appear in March, only shortly after the host plant begins growth. Pupation occurs in a fusiform, multi-layered cocoon of white silk.
