= Temnolopha mosaica =

Scientific classification
- Kingdom: Animalia
- Phylum: Arthropoda
- Clade: Pancrustacea
- Class: Insecta
- Order: Lepidoptera
- Family: Tortricidae
- Genus: Temnolopha
- Species: T. mosaica

Binomial name
- Temnolopha mosaica Lower, 1901

Synonyms
- Cydia clydonias Meyrick, 1907

Species of moth

Temnolopha mosaica is a moth of the family Tortricidae first described by Oswald Bertram Lower in 1901. It is found in Sri Lanka, Thailand, Cambodia, Java, Sulawesi, the Moluccan Islands, the Philippines and the Australian state of Queensland.

== Description ==
The wingspan of the adult is 2 cm. Forewings brownish with dark swirly markings. Its larval host plant is Alpinia galanga.
