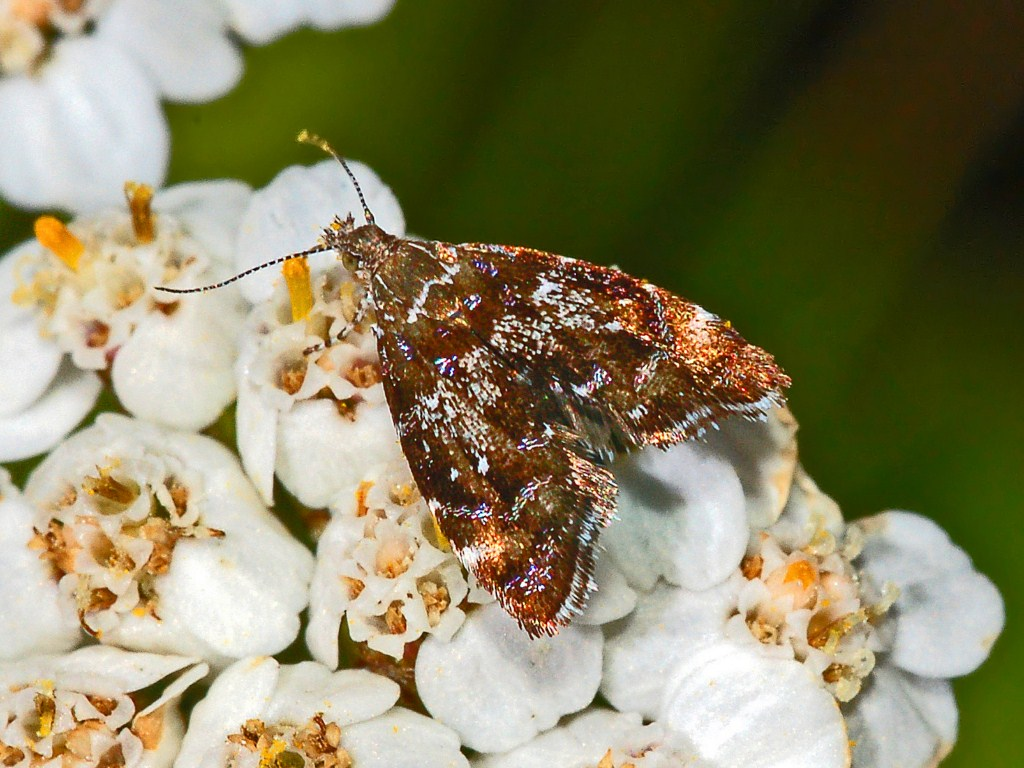

Scientific classification
- Kingdom: Animalia
- Phylum: Arthropoda
- Clade: Pancrustacea
- Class: Insecta
- Order: Lepidoptera
- Family: Choreutidae
- Genus: Prochoreutis
- Species: P. sehestediana

Binomial name
- Prochoreutis sehestediana (Fabricius, 1776)

Synonyms
- Pyralis sehestediana Fabricius, 1777; Anthophila punctosa Haworth, 1811; Choreutis philonyma Meyrick, 1912; Choreutis phalaraspis Meyrick, 1923

= Prochoreutis sehestediana =

Species of moth

Prochoreutis sestediana, also knowns as the silver-dot metal-mark is a moth of the family Choreutidae found in Asia and Europe. It was first described by Johan Christian Fabricius in 1776 from a specimen found in Kiel, Germany.

== Description ==
The wingspan is 9–12 mm and the forewings have silver dusting which expands over more than half of the forewing. The fore wings are rather wedge-shaped, with the tip obliquely truncate, brownish; the disc irrorated with minute coppery scales. The costa are dotted with white, the fringe is white, in front and behind dusky. The hind wings are ashy-brown, with an abbreviated whitish striga. There are two generations per year, adults are on wing in May and from July to August. They fly during the day.

The larvae initially mine the leaves of common skullcap (Scutellaria galericulata) and lesser skullcap (Scutellaria minor), later living in a silken web and feeding externally on the leaves.

== Distribution ==
It is found in most of Europe, India, China (Ningxia, Shaanxi), Sri Lanka, Nepal, Russia (Primorskiy kray, Ural, Evropeyskaya chast’, Kavkaz), Japan (Hokkaido, Shikoku), Asia Minor, Zakavkazye, Syria and the Oriental region.
