= Scrobipalpa scutellariaeella =

Scientific classification
- Kingdom: Animalia
- Phylum: Arthropoda
- Clade: Pancrustacea
- Class: Insecta
- Order: Lepidoptera
- Family: Gelechiidae
- Genus: Scrobipalpa
- Species: S. scutellariaeella

Binomial name
- Scrobipalpa scutellariaeella (Chambers, 1873)

Synonyms
- Gelechia scutellariaeella Chambers, 1873

Species of moth

Scrobipalpa scutellariaeella is a moth in the family Gelechiidae. It was described by Vactor Tousey Chambers in 1873. It is found in North America, where it has been recorded from Kentucky and Maine.

The wingspan is about 9.5 mm (0.37 in). Adults are brown, tinged with blue and dusted with pale or bluish white, with an indistinct whitish costal streak before the cilia and an opposite dorsal one. The white dusting on the forewings is more dense towards the apex.

The larvae feed on Scutellaria lateriflora. They mine the underside of the leaves and construct an external silk-lined tube that is also used for pupation.
