= Baicalin-beta-D-glucuronidase =

Identifiers
- EC no.: 3.2.1.167

Databases
- BRENDA: enzyme data
- ExPASy: NiceZyme view
- KEGG: enzyme entry
- MetaCyc: metabolic pathway
- Rhea: reactions
- PDB structures: RCSB PDB PDBe PDBsum
Search
- PMC: articles
- PubMed: articles
- NCBI: proteins

Baicalin-beta-D-glucuronidase (EC 3.2.1.167, baicalinase) is an enzyme with systematic name 5,6,7-trihydroxyflavone-7-O-beta-D-glucupyranosiduronate glucuronosylhydrolase. It catalyses the following chemical reaction

baicalin
H_{2}O
baicalein
+
D-glucuronic acid

The enzyme characterised from Scutellaria species removes the glycoside unit from baicalin, to give the flavone baicalein and D-glucuronic acid.

The enzyme also hydrolyses wogonin 7-O-beta-D-glucuronide and oroxylin 7-O-beta-D-glucuronide with lower efficiency.
