= Prochoreutis alpinoides =

Scientific classification
- Domain: Eukaryota
- Kingdom: Animalia
- Phylum: Arthropoda
- Class: Insecta
- Order: Lepidoptera
- Family: Choreutidae
- Genus: Prochoreutis
- Species: P. alpinoides

Binomial name
- Prochoreutis alpinoides Budashkin & Li, 2009

Species of moth

Prochoreutis alpinoides is a moth of the family Choreutidae. It is known from Shaanxi, China.

The wingspan is about 11 mm.

== Etymology ==
The specific name is derived from the Latin postfix oides (meaning like) and Prochoreutis alpina, indicating the similarity of the two species.
