= Scutellarein =

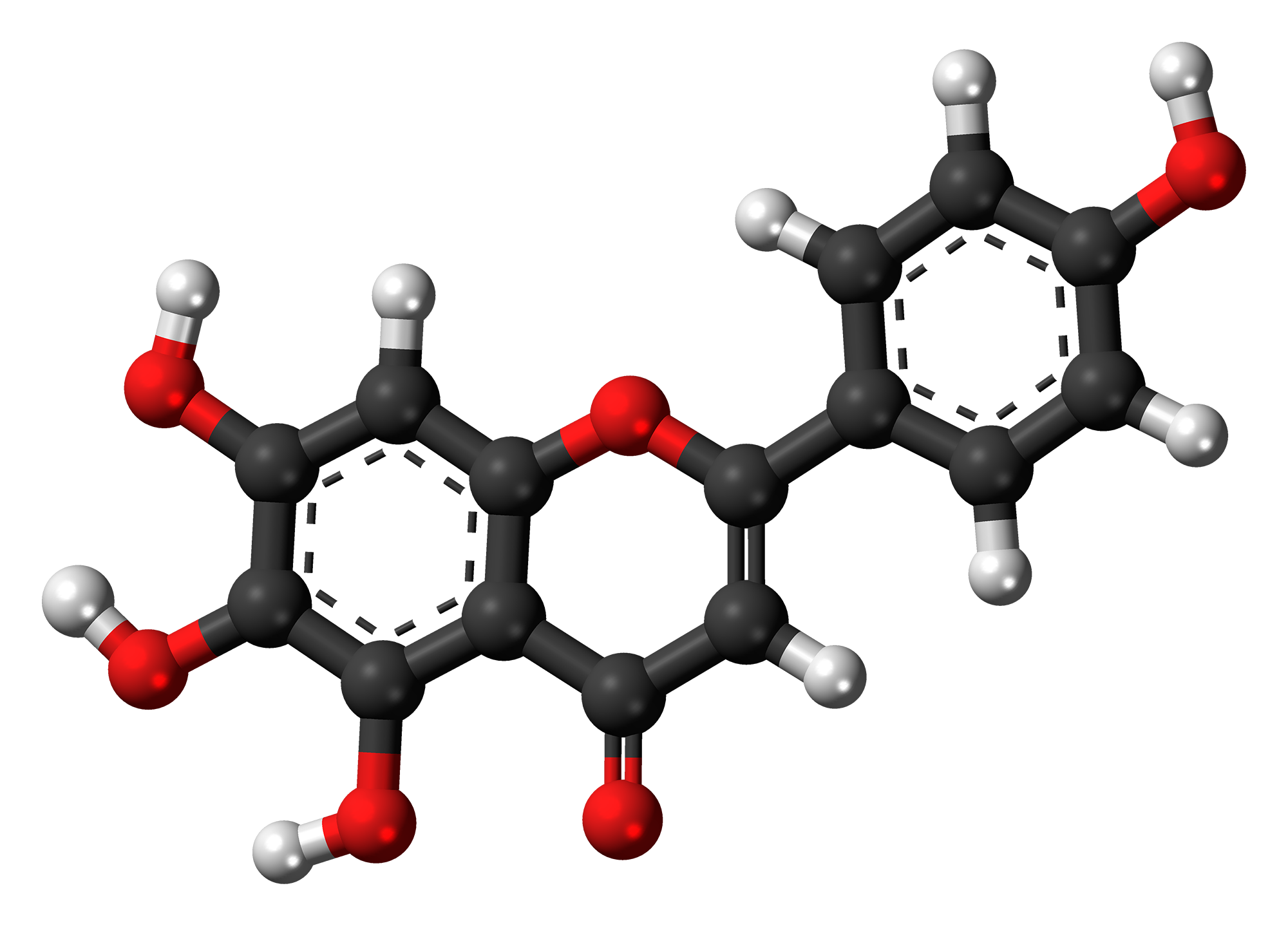

Names
- IUPAC name 4′,5,6,7-Tetrahydroxyflavone
- Systematic IUPAC name 5,6,7-Trihydroxy-2-(4-hydroxyphenyl)-4H-1-benzopyran-4-one
- Other names 6-Hydroxyapigenin

Identifiers
CAS Number	529-53-3
3D model (JSmol)	Interactive image
ChEBI	CHEBI:9062
ChEMBL	ChEMBL55415
ChemSpider	4445014
PubChem CID	5281697
UNII	P460GTI853
CompTox Dashboard (EPA)	DTXSID40200946
- InChI: InChI=1S/C15H10O6/c16-8-3-1-7(2-4-8)11-5-9(17)13-12(21-11)6-10(18)14(19)15(13)20/h1-6,16,18-20H Key: JVXZRQGOGOXCEC-UHFFFAOYSA-N; InChI=1/C15H10O6/c16-8-3-1-7(2-4-8)11-5-9(17)13-12(21-11)6-10(18)14(19)15(13)20/h1-6,16,18-20H Key: JVXZRQGOGOXCEC-UHFFFAOYAD
- SMILES: C13=C(OC(=CC1=O)C2=CC=C(O)C=C2)C=C(O)C(=C3O)O

Properties
Chemical formula	C_{15}H_{10}O_{6}
Molar mass	286.241 g/mol
- Except where otherwise noted, data are given for materials in their standard state (at 25 °C [77 °F], 100 kPa). verify (what is ?) Infobox references

Scutellarein is a flavone that can be found in Scutellaria lateriflora and other members of the genus Scutellaria, as well as the fern Asplenium belangeri.

== Glycosides ==
The scutellarin (Scutellarein-7-glucuronide) is transformed by hydrolysis into scutellarein.
