= Prochoreutis dyarella =

Scientific classification
- Domain: Eukaryota
- Kingdom: Animalia
- Phylum: Arthropoda
- Class: Insecta
- Order: Lepidoptera
- Family: Choreutidae
- Genus: Prochoreutis
- Species: P. dyarella

Binomial name
- Prochoreutis dyarella (Kearfott, 1902)

Synonyms
- Choreutis dyarella Kearfott, 1902

Species of moth

Prochoreutis dyarella is a moth of the family Choreutidae. It is known from North America, including California.
