= Prochoreutis sororculella =

Scientific classification
- Kingdom: Animalia
- Phylum: Arthropoda
- Class: Insecta
- Order: Lepidoptera
- Family: Choreutidae
- Genus: Prochoreutis
- Species: P. sororculella

Binomial name
- Prochoreutis sororculella (Dyar, 1900)

Synonyms
- Choreutis sororculella Dyar, 1900

Species of moth

Prochoreutis sororculella is a moth of the family Choreutidae. It is found in North America, including California and Ontario. It was described as Choreutis sororculella by Dyar in 1900.
