= Prochoreutis extrincicella =

Scientific classification
- Kingdom: Animalia
- Phylum: Arthropoda
- Class: Insecta
- Order: Lepidoptera
- Family: Choreutidae
- Genus: Prochoreutis
- Species: P. extrincicella

Binomial name
- Prochoreutis extrincicella (Dyar, 1900)

Synonyms
- Choreutis extrincicella Dyar, 1900

Species of moth

Prochoreutis extrincicella is a moth of the family Choreutidae. It is found in the United States, including Illinois, Maryland and Kentucky.

Adults are on wing in June.
