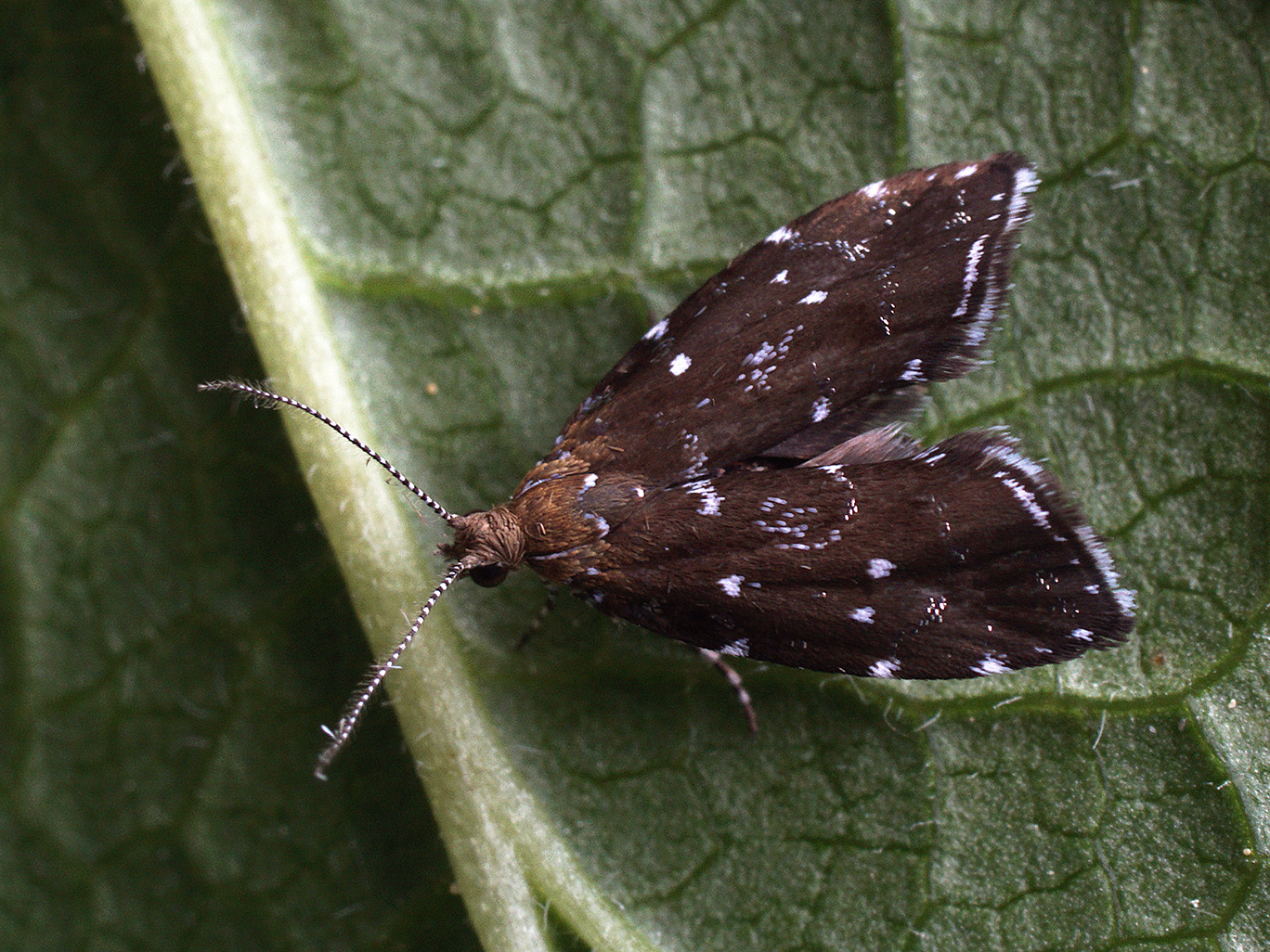

Scientific classification
- Domain: Eukaryota
- Kingdom: Animalia
- Phylum: Arthropoda
- Class: Insecta
- Order: Lepidoptera
- Family: Choreutidae
- Genus: Prochoreutis
- Species: P. ultimana

Binomial name
- Prochoreutis ultimana (Krulikovsky, 1909)

Synonyms
- Choreutis ultimana Krulikovsky, 1909; Choreutis montelli Hackman, 1947

= Prochoreutis ultimana =

Species of moth

Prochoreutis ultimana is a moth of the family Choreutidae. It is found from Sweden, Finland, the Baltic states and northern Russia to Japan.

The wingspan is 10–11 mm.
