= Prochoreutis stellaris =

Scientific classification
- Kingdom: Animalia
- Phylum: Arthropoda
- Clade: Pancrustacea
- Class: Insecta
- Order: Lepidoptera
- Family: Choreutidae
- Genus: Prochoreutis
- Species: P. stellaris

Binomial name
- Prochoreutis stellaris (Zeller, 1847)

Synonyms
- Choreutis stellaris Zeller, 1847

Species of moth

Prochoreutis stellaris is a moth of the family Choreutidae. It is found from France and Italy through Austria, Hungary and Slovakia to Ukraine and then south to Romania, Bulgaria and Greece, North Macedonia and Albania.
