= Prochoreutis talyshensis =

Scientific classification
- Domain: Eukaryota
- Kingdom: Animalia
- Phylum: Arthropoda
- Class: Insecta
- Order: Lepidoptera
- Family: Choreutidae
- Genus: Prochoreutis
- Species: P. talyshensis

Binomial name
- Prochoreutis talyshensis (Danilevsky, 1969)

Synonyms
- Choreutis talyshensis Danilevsky, 1969

Species of moth

Prochoreutis talyshensis is a moth in the family Choreutidae. It was described by Aleksandr Sergeievich Danilevsky in 1969. It is found in Azerbaijan.
