= Prochoreutis intermediana =

Scientific classification
- Domain: Eukaryota
- Kingdom: Animalia
- Phylum: Arthropoda
- Class: Insecta
- Order: Lepidoptera
- Family: Choreutidae
- Genus: Prochoreutis
- Species: P. intermediana

Binomial name
- Prochoreutis intermediana (Rebel, 1910)

Synonyms
- Choreutis intermediana Rebel, 1910

Species of moth

Prochoreutis intermediana is a moth in the family Choreutidae. It was described by Rebel in 1910. It is found in the Alai Mountains.
