= Prochoreutis holotoxa =

Scientific classification
- Kingdom: Animalia
- Phylum: Arthropoda
- Class: Insecta
- Order: Lepidoptera
- Family: Choreutidae
- Genus: Prochoreutis
- Species: P. holotoxa

Binomial name
- Prochoreutis holotoxa (Meyrick, 1903)

Synonyms
- Choreutis myllerana forma holotoxa Meyrick, 1903; Choreutis sibirica Hackman, 1947; Choreutis incerta Capuse, 1970; Choreutis myllerana holotoxa Meyrick, 1903

Species of moth

Prochoreutis holotoxa is a moth of the family Choreutidae. It is known from China (Shanxi), France (Alps), Italy, Austria (Tirol), Switzerland (Zermatt), Romania and Russia (Siberia).

The larvae feed on Pedicularis ascendens.
