= Prochoreutis subdelicata =

Scientific classification
- Kingdom: Animalia
- Phylum: Arthropoda
- Clade: Pancrustacea
- Class: Insecta
- Order: Lepidoptera
- Family: Choreutidae
- Genus: Prochoreutis
- Species: P. subdelicata

Binomial name
- Prochoreutis subdelicata Arita, 1987

Species of moth

Prochoreutis subdelicata is a moth in the family Choreutidae. It was described by Yutaka Arita in 1987. It is found in Japan and Russia.
