= Prochoreutis diakonoffi =

Scientific classification
- Kingdom: Animalia
- Phylum: Arthropoda
- Clade: Pancrustacea
- Class: Insecta
- Order: Lepidoptera
- Family: Choreutidae
- Genus: Prochoreutis
- Species: P. diakonoffi

Binomial name
- Prochoreutis diakonoffi Arita, 1985

Species of moth

Prochoreutis diakonoffi is a species of metalmark moth in the family Choreutidae. It is known from Shaanxi, China and from Honshu, Japan.
