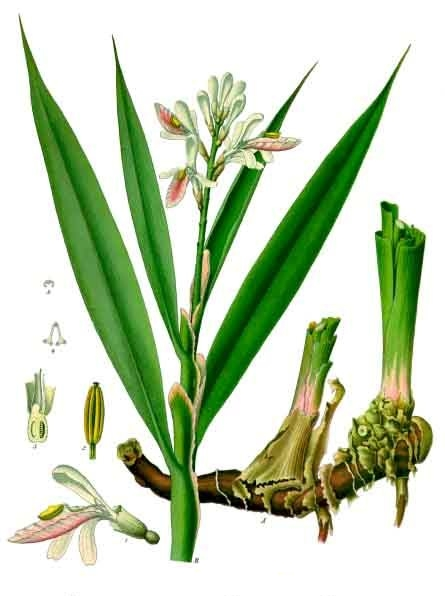

Scientific classification
- Kingdom: Plantae
- Clade: Embryophytes
- Clade: Tracheophytes
- Clade: Angiosperms
- Clade: Monocots
- Clade: Commelinids
- Order: Zingiberales
- Family: Zingiberaceae
- Genus: Alpinia
- Species: A. officinarum

Binomial name
- Alpinia officinarum Hance

Synonyms
- Languas officinarum (Hance) P.H.Hô

= Alpinia officinarum =

Species of flowering plant

Alpinia officinarum, known as lesser galangal, is a plant in the ginger family, cultivated in Southeast Asia. It originated in China, where its name ultimately derives. It can grow 1.5 to 2 m high, with long leaves and reddish-white flowers. The rhizomes, known as galangal, are valued for their sweet spicy flavor and aromatic scent. These are used throughout Asia in curries and perfumes, and were previously used widely in Europe. They are also used as a herbal remedy.

== Etymology ==
The genus is named for Prospero Alpini, a 17th-century Italian botanist who specialized in exotic plants. The word "galangal" comes from the Arabic form of a Chinese word for the plant, "高良薑" ("gou-loeng-goeng" in Cantonese, "gao-liang-jiang" in Mandarin). In Tamil it is known as a "சிற்றரத்தை or சித்தரத்தை" ("see-tha-ra-thai), widely used in Siddha Medicine and in culinary.

== Description ==
This herbaceous plant can grow up to 2 metres in height. The leaves are lanceolate (long and thin), and the flowers are white with streaks of red, growing from a spike at the top. The plant's rhizomes, the part known as galangal, are thin and tough, and they are the principal reason the plant is cultivated. They have orange flesh with a brown coating, and have an aromatic odor and a sweet flavor. These are smaller than greater galangal which have a stronger peppery pine-like bite that is lacking in the sweeter rhizomes of lesser galangal.

== Uses ==
The galangal rhizomes were widely used in ancient and medieval Europe, where they were reputed to smell of roses and taste of sweet spice. Its use in Europe has dramatically declined.

In Asia the rhizomes are ground to powder for use in curries, drinks, and jellies. In India an extract is used in perfumes, and Tartars prepare a tea with it.

Alpinia officinarum contains high concentrations of the flavonol galangin. Historically, the rhizomes were reputed to have stimulant and digestive effects.

== Distribution ==
Lesser galangal is native to China, growing mainly on the southeastern coast, including Hainan, and is also grown in Japan, Thailand, and Vietnam. It is also cultivated in India. Hong Kong is the commercial center for the sale and distribution of the lesser galangal.

== Common name confusion ==
Although the common name "lesser galangal" most appropriately refers to Alpinia officinarum, it is sometimes misapplied to other plants, such as Kaempferia galanga, which has a peppery camphorous taste and is used in Indonesia, Malaysia and other Southeast Asian countries. Cyperus longus is sometimes referred to as "galingal", and has similar uses, with spicy, starchy rhizomes used in cooking. Boesenbergia rotunda, also called Chinese ginger or fingerroot, is sometimes also referred to as "lesser galangal".
