= Prochoreutis bella =

Scientific classification
- Domain: Eukaryota
- Kingdom: Animalia
- Phylum: Arthropoda
- Class: Insecta
- Order: Lepidoptera
- Family: Choreutidae
- Genus: Prochoreutis
- Species: P. bella

Binomial name
- Prochoreutis bella Budashkin, 2003

Species of moth

Prochoreutis bella is a moth of the family Choreutidae. It is known from Tadzhikistan.

The wingspan is about 9 mm.
