= Prochoreutis drosodoxa =

Scientific classification
- Kingdom: Animalia
- Phylum: Arthropoda
- Class: Insecta
- Order: Lepidoptera
- Family: Choreutidae
- Genus: Prochoreutis
- Species: P. drosodoxa

Binomial name
- Prochoreutis drosodoxa (Meyrick, 1933)

Synonyms
- Choreutis drosodoxa Meyrick, 1933

Species of moth

Prochoreutis drosodoxa is a moth in the family Choreutidae. It was described by Edward Meyrick in 1933. It is found in Kashmir.
