= 5,7-Dihydroxy-6-methoxy-2-(4-phenoxyphenyl)chromen-4-one =

Names
- IUPAC name 5,7-Dihydroxy-6-methoxy-4′-phenoxyflavone
- Systematic IUPAC name 5,7-Dihydroxy-6-methoxy-2-(4-phenoxyphenyl)-4H-1-benzopyran-4-one

Identifiers
CAS Number	1342207-75-3
3D model (JSmol)	Interactive image
ChemSpider	67491738
PubChem CID	57405801
- InChI: InChI=1S/C22H16O6/c1-26-22-17(24)12-19-20(21(22)25)16(23)11-18(28-19)13-7-9-15(10-8-13)27-14-5-3-2-4-6-14/h2-12,24-25H,1H3 Key: FUBRAMOFTBBVFU-UHFFFAOYSA-N
- SMILES: COC1=C(C2=C(C=C1O)OC(=CC2=O)C3=CC=C(C=C3)OC4=CC=CC=C4)O

Properties
Chemical formula	C_{22}H_{16}O_{6}
Molar mass	376.364 g·mol^{−1}
- Except where otherwise noted, data are given for materials in their standard state (at 25 °C [77 °F], 100 kPa). Infobox references

5,7-Dihydroxy-6-methoxy-2(4-phenoxyphenyl)-4H-chromene-4-one (DMPC) is a derivative of oroxylin A. It has memory improving effects and can reduce ADHD-like behavior.

== Mechanism of action ==
As a derivative of oroxylin A, it has similar activity; In rats, DMPC has been shown to block the reuptake of dopamine similarly to methylphenidate, however it does not act at the norepinephrine transporter. This has resulted in attenuated ADHD-like behavior, but unlike methylphenidate and other ADHD medications, it did not display addictive properties. These factors could make it useful as a non-addictive ADHD drug, as the usage of stimulants to treat ADHD has been shown to have addictive properties.

DMPC also possesses memory improving properties, it is able to attenuate memory impairment induced by scopolamine and MK-801. It also had memory-enhancing effects if administered alone.

DMPC is able to block the chloride influx induced by muscimol at GABA_{A} receptors, suggesting that it is a GABA_{A} antagonist or negative modulator.
