= Prochoreutis brunescens =

Scientific classification
- Domain: Eukaryota
- Kingdom: Animalia
- Phylum: Arthropoda
- Class: Insecta
- Order: Lepidoptera
- Family: Choreutidae
- Genus: Prochoreutis
- Species: P. brunescens

Binomial name
- Prochoreutis brunescens (Diakonoff, 1978)

Synonyms
- Choreutis brunescens Diakonoff, 1978

Species of moth

Prochoreutis brunescens is a moth in the family Choreutidae. It was described by Alexey Diakonoff in 1978. It is found on Kyushu in Japan.
