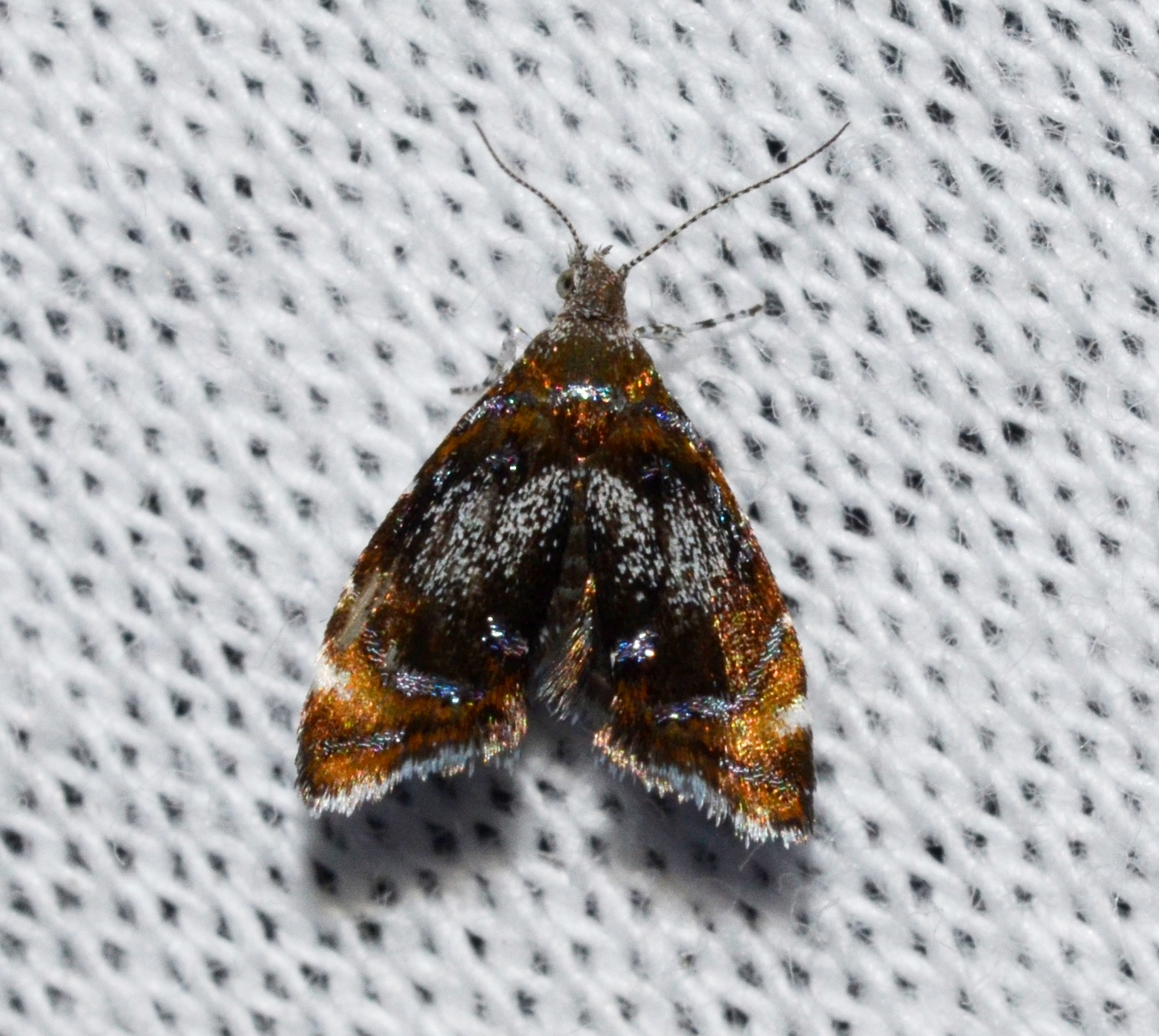
- Prochoreutis inflatella

Scientific classification
- Kingdom: Animalia
- Phylum: Arthropoda
- Clade: Pancrustacea
- Class: Insecta
- Order: Lepidoptera
- Family: Choreutidae
- Genus: Prochoreutis; Heppner, 1981

= Prochoreutis =

Genus of moths

Prochoreutis is a genus of moths in the family Choreutidae.

== Species ==
- Prochoreutis alpina (Arita, 1976)
- Prochoreutis alpinoides Budashkin & Li, 2009
- Prochoreutis argyrastra (Meyrick, 1932)
- Prochoreutis arisema (Diakonoff, 1978)
- Prochoreutis atrox (Diakonoff, 1978)
- Prochoreutis bella Budashkin, 2003
- Prochoreutis brunescens (Diakonoff, 1978)
- Prochoreutis chionocosma (Diakonoff, 1978)
- Prochoreutis clemensella (Walsingham, 1914)
- Prochoreutis delicata (Arita, 1976)
- Prochoreutis diakonoffi Arita, 1985
- Prochoreutis drosodoxa (Meyrick, 1933)
- Prochoreutis dyarella (Kearfott, 1902)
- Prochoreutis extrincicella (Dyar, 1900)
- Prochoreutis hadrogastra (Diakonoff, 1978)
- Prochoreutis halimora (Meyrick, 1912)
- Prochoreutis hestiarcha (Meyrick, 1912)
- Prochoreutis holotoxa (Meyrick, 1903)
- Prochoreutis inflatella (Clemens, 1863)
- Prochoreutis intermediana (Rebel, 1910)
- Prochoreutis kurokoi Arita, 1987
- Prochoreutis miniholotoxa Budashkin, 2003
- Prochoreutis monognoma (Diakonoff, 1978)
- Prochoreutis myllerana (Fabricius, 1794)
- Prochoreutis pernivalis (Braun, 1921)
- Prochoreutis pseudostellaris Budashkin, 2003
- Prochoreutis radians (Diakonoff, 1978)
- Prochoreutis sachalinensis (Danilevsky, 1969)
- Prochoreutis sehestediana (Fabricius, 1776)
- Prochoreutis solaris (Erschoff, 1877)
- Prochoreutis sororculella (Dyar, 1900)
- Prochoreutis stellaris (Zeller, 1847)
- Prochoreutis subdelicata Arita, 1987
- Prochoreutis talyshensis (Danilevsky, 1969)
- Prochoreutis ultimana (Krulikowsky, 1909)
- Prochoreutis ussurica (Danilevsky, 1969)
