= Temnolopha =

Scientific classification
- Domain: Eukaryota
- Kingdom: Animalia
- Phylum: Arthropoda
- Class: Insecta
- Order: Lepidoptera
- Family: Tortricidae
- Tribe: Olethreutini
- Genus: Temnolopha; Lower, 1901

Genus of tortrix moths

Temnolopha is a genus of moths belonging to the subfamily Olethreutinae of the family Tortricidae.

== Species ==
- Temnolopha abstrusana Kuznetzov, 1988
- Temnolopha bigutatta Diakonoff, 1973
- Temnolopha matura Diakonoff, 1973
- Temnolopha mosaica Lower, 1901
- Temnolopha sponditis (Meyrick, 1918)

== See also ==
- List of Tortricidae genera
