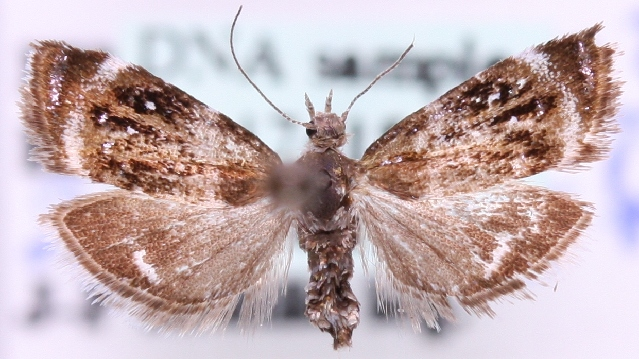

Scientific classification
- Domain: Eukaryota
- Kingdom: Animalia
- Phylum: Arthropoda
- Class: Insecta
- Order: Lepidoptera
- Family: Choreutidae
- Genus: Prochoreutis
- Species: P. solaris

Binomial name
- Prochoreutis solaris (Erschoff, 1877)

Synonyms
- Choreutis solaris Erschoff, 1877

= Prochoreutis solaris =

Species of moth

Prochoreutis solaris is a moth of the family Choreutidae. It is known from northern Europe, Russia, the Kuril Islands and Japan (Hokkaido).

The wingspan is about 12 mm.

Adults are on wing during the day.
