= Temnolopha matura =

Scientific classification
- Kingdom: Animalia
- Phylum: Arthropoda
- Class: Insecta
- Order: Lepidoptera
- Family: Tortricidae
- Genus: Temnolopha
- Species: T. matura

Binomial name
- Temnolopha matura Diakonoff, 1973

Species of moth

Temnolopha matura is a moth of the family Tortricidae. It is found in Thailand, Taiwan and Borneo.

The wingspan is about 17 mm.
