= Prochoreutis hadrogastra =

Scientific classification
- Domain: Eukaryota
- Kingdom: Animalia
- Phylum: Arthropoda
- Class: Insecta
- Order: Lepidoptera
- Family: Choreutidae
- Genus: Prochoreutis
- Species: P. hadrogastra

Binomial name
- Prochoreutis hadrogastra (Diakonoff, 1978)

Synonyms
- Choreutis hadrogastra Diakonoff, 1978

Species of moth

Prochoreutis hadrogastra is a moth in the family Choreutidae. It was described by Alexey Diakonoff in 1978. It is found in Japan and the Russian Far East.

The larvae feed on Leucosceptrum stellipilum.
