= Prochoreutis pseudostellaris =

Scientific classification
- Domain: Eukaryota
- Kingdom: Animalia
- Phylum: Arthropoda
- Class: Insecta
- Order: Lepidoptera
- Family: Choreutidae
- Genus: Prochoreutis
- Species: P. pseudostellaris

Binomial name
- Prochoreutis pseudostellaris Budashkin, 2003

Species of moth

Prochoreutis pseudostellaris is a moth of the family Choreutidae. It is known from the Crimea and Turkey.

The wingspan is 12-13.5 mm.
