= Prochoreutis kurokoi =

Scientific classification
- Kingdom: Animalia
- Phylum: Arthropoda
- Clade: Pancrustacea
- Class: Insecta
- Order: Lepidoptera
- Family: Choreutidae
- Genus: Prochoreutis
- Species: P. kurokoi

Binomial name
- Prochoreutis kurokoi Arita, 1987

Species of moth

Prochoreutis kurokoi is a moth in the family Choreutidae. It was described by Yutaka Arita in 1987. It is found in Japan.
