= Prochoreutis atrox =

Scientific classification
- Domain: Eukaryota
- Kingdom: Animalia
- Phylum: Arthropoda
- Class: Insecta
- Order: Lepidoptera
- Family: Choreutidae
- Genus: Prochoreutis
- Species: P. atrox

Binomial name
- Prochoreutis atrox (Diakonoff, 1978)

Synonyms
- Choreutis atrox Diakonoff, 1978

Species of moth

Prochoreutis atrox is a moth in the family Choreutidae. It was described by Alexey Diakonoff in 1978. It is found in Afghanistan.
