= Prochoreutis clemensella =

Scientific classification
- Domain: Eukaryota
- Kingdom: Animalia
- Phylum: Arthropoda
- Class: Insecta
- Order: Lepidoptera
- Family: Choreutidae
- Genus: Prochoreutis
- Species: P. clemensella

Binomial name
- Prochoreutis clemensella (Walsingham, 1914)

Synonyms
- Porpe clemensella Walsingham, 1914

Species of moth

Prochoreutis clemensella is a moth in the family Choreutidae. It was described by Walsingham in 1914. It is found in Mexico.
