= Prochoreutis sachalinensis =

Scientific classification
- Kingdom: Animalia
- Phylum: Arthropoda
- Clade: Pancrustacea
- Class: Insecta
- Order: Lepidoptera
- Family: Choreutidae
- Genus: Prochoreutis
- Species: P. sachalinensis

Binomial name
- Prochoreutis sachalinensis (Danilevsky, 1969)

Synonyms
- Choreutis sachalinensis Danilevsky, 1969; Choreutis calliclisa Diakonoff, 1978

Species of moth

Prochoreutis sachalinensis is a moth in the family Choreutidae. It was described by Aleksandr Sergeievich Danilevsky in 1969. It is found on Sakhalin Island and in the Russian Far East and Hunan, China.
