= Prochoreutis miniholotoxa =

Scientific classification
- Kingdom: Animalia
- Phylum: Arthropoda
- Class: Insecta
- Order: Lepidoptera
- Family: Choreutidae
- Genus: Prochoreutis
- Species: P. miniholotoxa

Binomial name
- Prochoreutis miniholotoxa Budashkin, 2003

Species of moth

Prochoreutis miniholotoxa is a moth of the family Choreutidae. It is known from Kyrgyzstan.

The wingspan is about 9.5 mm.
