= Prochoreutis argyrastra =

Scientific classification
- Kingdom: Animalia
- Phylum: Arthropoda
- Class: Insecta
- Order: Lepidoptera
- Family: Choreutidae
- Genus: Prochoreutis
- Species: P. argyrastra

Binomial name
- Prochoreutis argyrastra (Meyrick, 1932)

Synonyms
- Choreutis argyrastra Meyrick, 1932

Species of moth

Prochoreutis argyrastra is a species of moth of the family Choreutidae. It is found in Ethiopia.
