= Prochoreutis radians =

Scientific classification
- Kingdom: Animalia
- Phylum: Arthropoda
- Clade: Pancrustacea
- Class: Insecta
- Order: Lepidoptera
- Family: Choreutidae
- Genus: Prochoreutis
- Species: P. radians

Binomial name
- Prochoreutis radians (Diakonoff, 1978)

Synonyms
- Choreutis radians Diakonoff, 1978

Species of moth

Prochoreutis radians is a moth in the family Choreutidae. It was described by Alexey Diakonoff in 1978. It is found in Afghanistan.

The larvae feed on Nepeta honigbergeri.
