= Prochoreutis hestiarcha =

Scientific classification
- Kingdom: Animalia
- Phylum: Arthropoda
- Class: Insecta
- Order: Lepidoptera
- Family: Choreutidae
- Genus: Prochoreutis
- Species: P. hestiarcha

Binomial name
- Prochoreutis hestiarcha (Meyrick, 1912)

Synonyms
- Choreutis hestiarcha Meyrick, 1912

Species of moth

Prochoreutis hestiarcha is a moth in the family Choreutidae. It was described by Edward Meyrick in 1912. It is found in Assam in India and in China (Shillong, Guangdong).
