= Prochoreutis pernivalis =

Scientific classification
- Domain: Eukaryota
- Kingdom: Animalia
- Phylum: Arthropoda
- Class: Insecta
- Order: Lepidoptera
- Family: Choreutidae
- Genus: Prochoreutis
- Species: P. pernivalis

Binomial name
- Prochoreutis pernivalis (Braun, 1921)

Synonyms
- Choreutis pernivalis Braun, 1921

Species of moth

Prochoreutis pernivalis is a moth of the family Choreutidae. It is known from Canada, including British Columbia and Alberta.
