= Prochoreutis delicata =

Scientific classification
- Kingdom: Animalia
- Phylum: Arthropoda
- Clade: Pancrustacea
- Class: Insecta
- Order: Lepidoptera
- Family: Choreutidae
- Genus: Prochoreutis
- Species: P. delicata

Binomial name
- Prochoreutis delicata (Arita, 1976)

Synonyms
- Choreutis delicata Arita, 1976

Species of moth

Prochoreutis delicata is a moth in the family Choreutidae. It was described by Yutaka Arita in 1976. It is found in Honshu, Japan.
