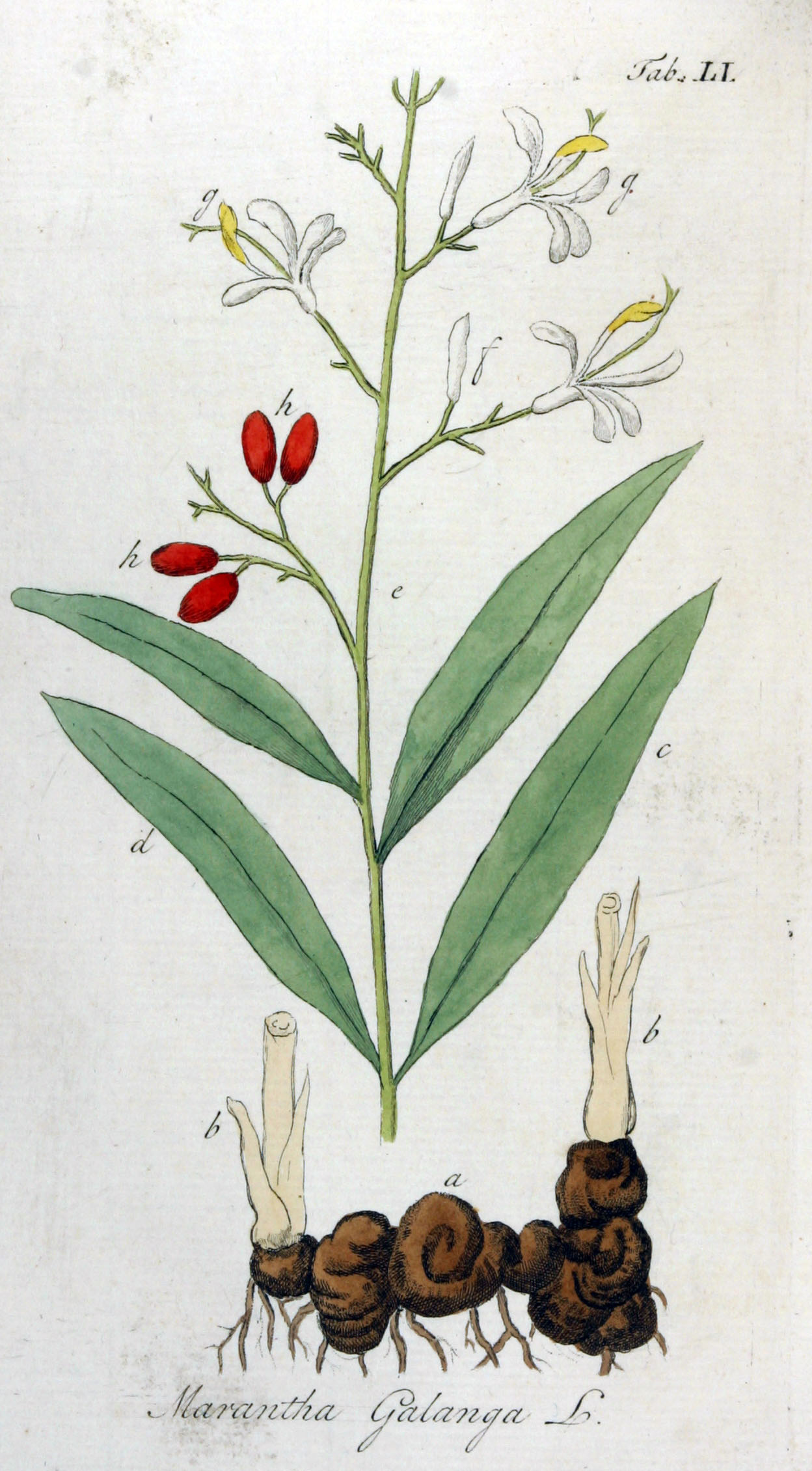

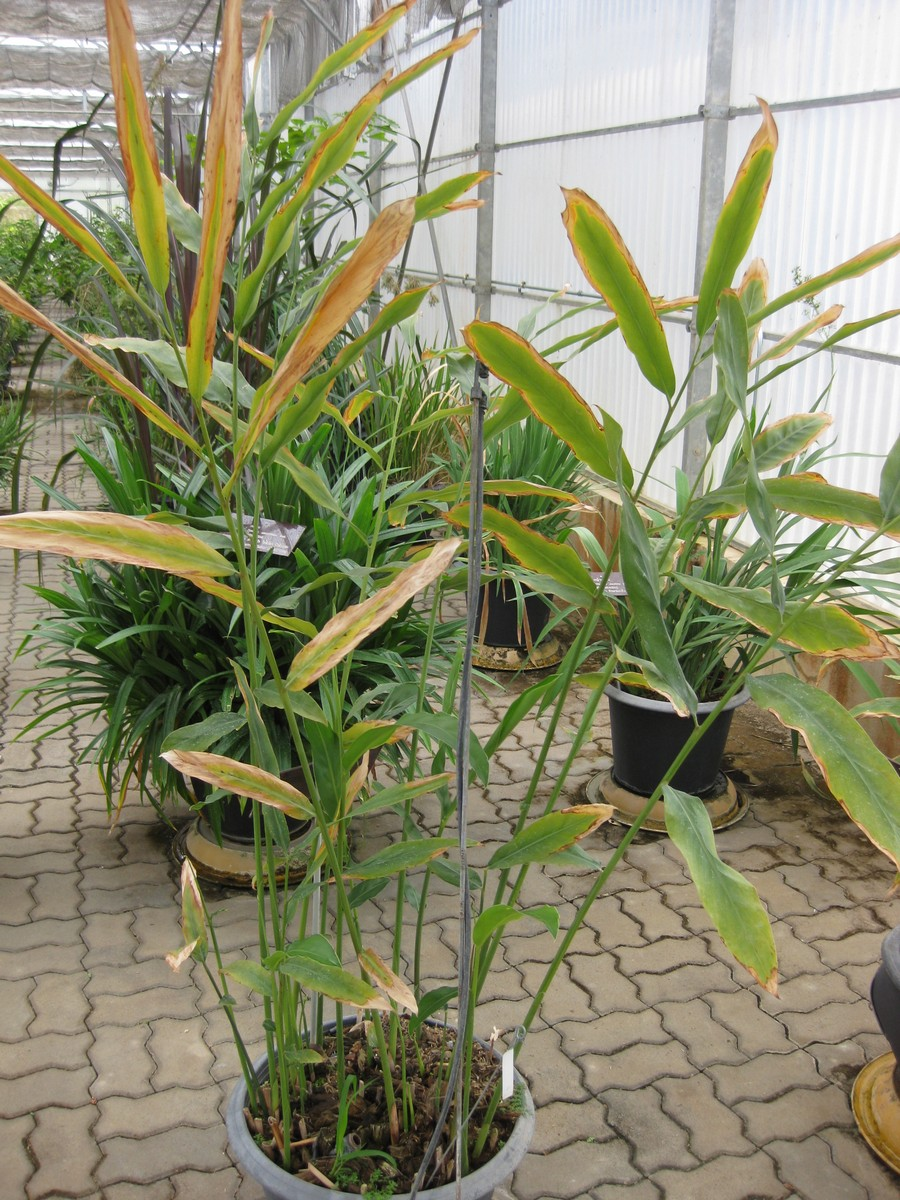

Scientific classification
- Kingdom: Plantae
- Clade: Tracheophytes
- Clade: Angiosperms
- Clade: Monocots
- Clade: Commelinids
- Order: Zingiberales
- Family: Zingiberaceae
- Genus: Alpinia
- Species: A. galanga

Binomial name
- Alpinia galanga (L.) Willd.

= Alpinia galanga =

Species of flowering plant

Alpinia galanga, a plant in the ginger family, bears a rhizome used largely as an herb in Unani medicine and as a spice in Southeast Asian cookery. It is one of four plants known as "galangal". Its common names include greater galangal, lengkuas, and blue ginger.

== Names ==
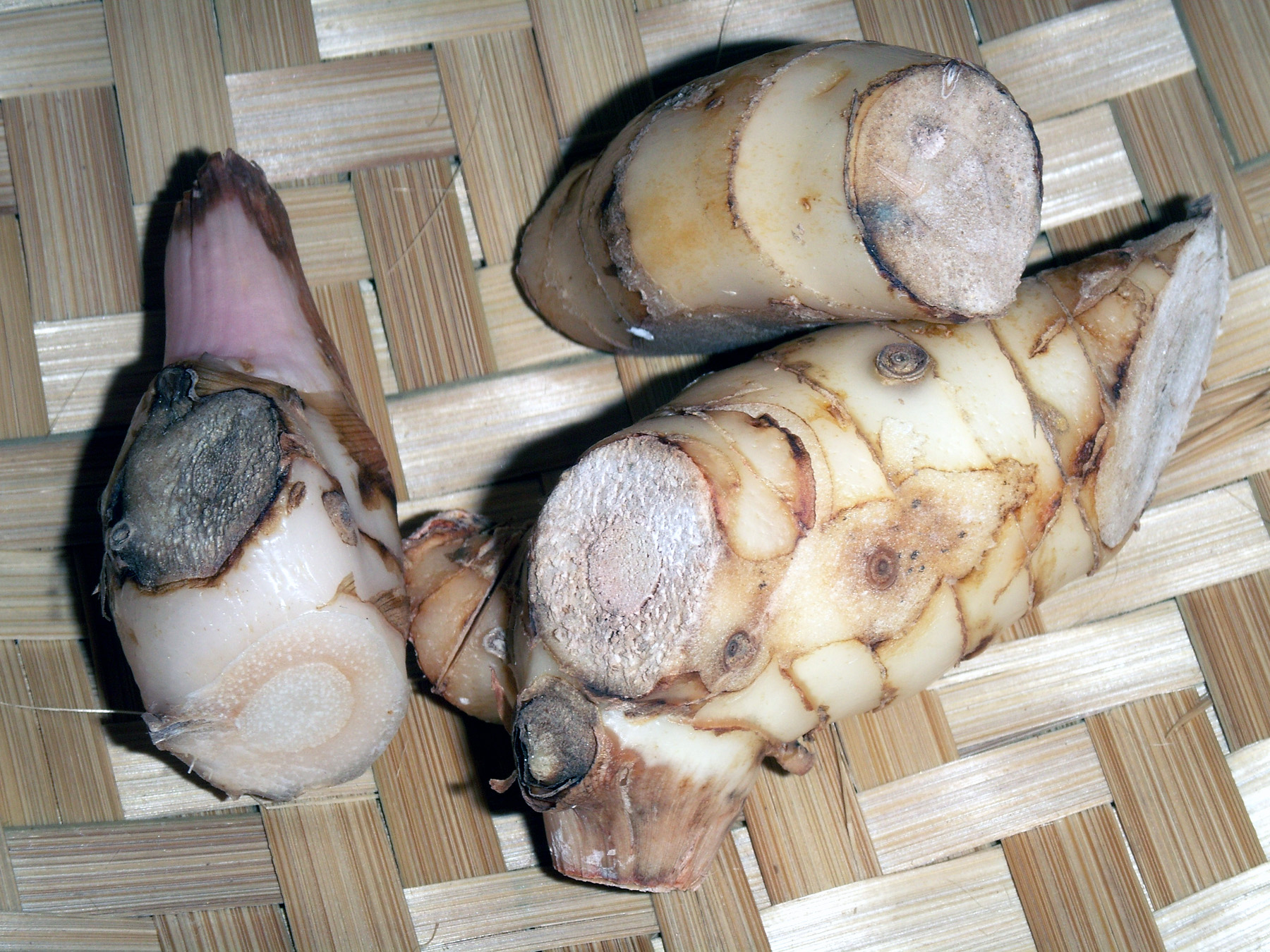
A. galanga rhizomes

The name "galangal" is probably derived from Persian qulanjan or Arabic khalanjan, which in turn may be an adaptation of Chinese gao liang jiang. Its names in North India are derived from the same root, including kulanja in Sanskrit, kulanjan in Hindi, and kholinjan in Urdu.

The name "lengkuas", on the other hand, is derived from Malay lengkuas, which is derived from Proto-Western Malayo-Polynesian *laŋkuas, with cognates including Ilokano langkuás; Tagalog, Bikol, Kapampangan, Visayan, and Manobo langkáuas or langkáwas; Aklanon eangkawás; Kadazan Dusun hongkuas; Ida'an lengkuas; Ngaju Dayak langkuas; and Iban engkuas. Some of the names have become generalized and are also applied to other species of Alpinia as well as for Curcuma zedoaria.

Alpinia galanga is also called laos in Javanese and laja in Sundanese. Other names include romdeng (រំដេង) in Cambodia; pa de kaw (ပတဲကော) in Myanmar; kha (ข่า) in Thailand; nankyō (ナンキョウ, 南姜) in Japan; and hóng dòu kòu (紅豆寇) in Mandarin Chinese. In Tamil it is known as a "பேரரத்தை or பெரியரத்தை" ("Pae-reeya-ra-thai"), widely used in Siddha Medicine and in culinaries. In Sri Lanka it is known as Araththa (අරත්ත).

== History of domestication ==
Lengkuas is native to South and Southeast Asia. Its original center of cultivation during the spice trade was Java, and today it is still cultivated extensively in Island Southeast Asia, most notably in the Greater Sunda Islands and the Philippines. Its cultivation has also spread into Mainland Southeast Asia, most notably Thailand. Lengkuas is also the source of the leaves used to make nanel among the Kavalan people of Taiwan, a rolled leaf instrument used as a traditional children's toy common among Austronesian cultures.

== Description ==
The plant grows from rhizomes in clumps of stiff stalks up to 2 metres (6 ft 7 in) in height with abundant long leaves that bear red fruit. It is an evergreen perennial. This plant's rhizome is the "galangal" used most often in cookery. It is valued for its use in food and traditional medicine. The rhizome has a pungent smell and strong taste reminiscent of citrus, black pepper and pine needles. Red and white cultivars are often used differently, with red cultivars being primarily medicinal, and white cultivars primarily as a spice. The red fruit is used in traditional Chinese medicine and has a flavor similar to cardamom.

== Culinary uses ==
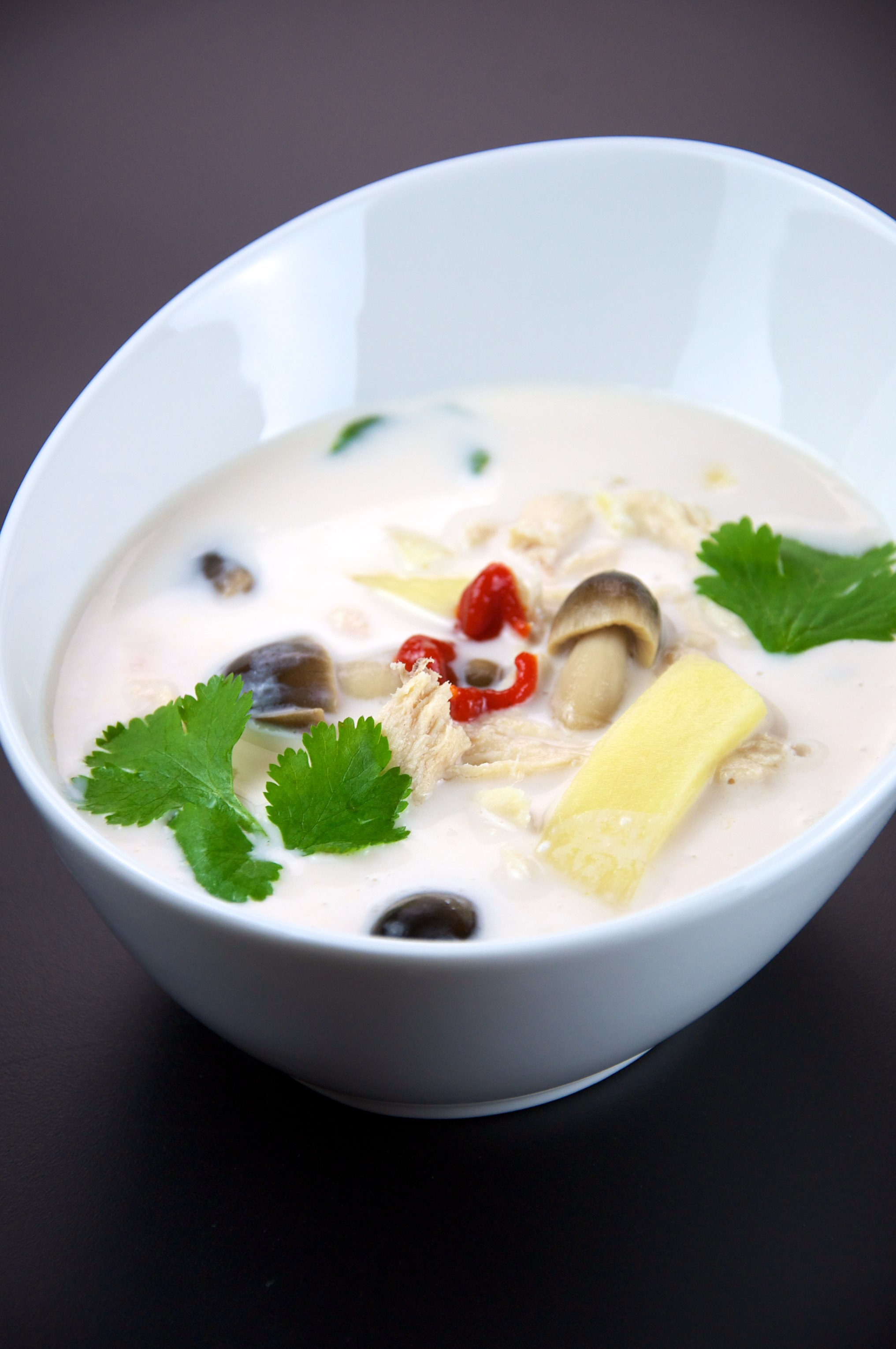
Tom kha kai, a Thai dish

The rhizome is a common ingredient in Thai curries and soups such as tom kha kai, where it is used fresh in chunks or cut into thin slices, mashed and mixed into curry paste.

It is also traditionally fermented with honey to produce the wine known as byais among the Mansaka people of the Philippines.

When dried and powdered, it is also commonly used in nihari spice mixes.

== Traditional medicine ==
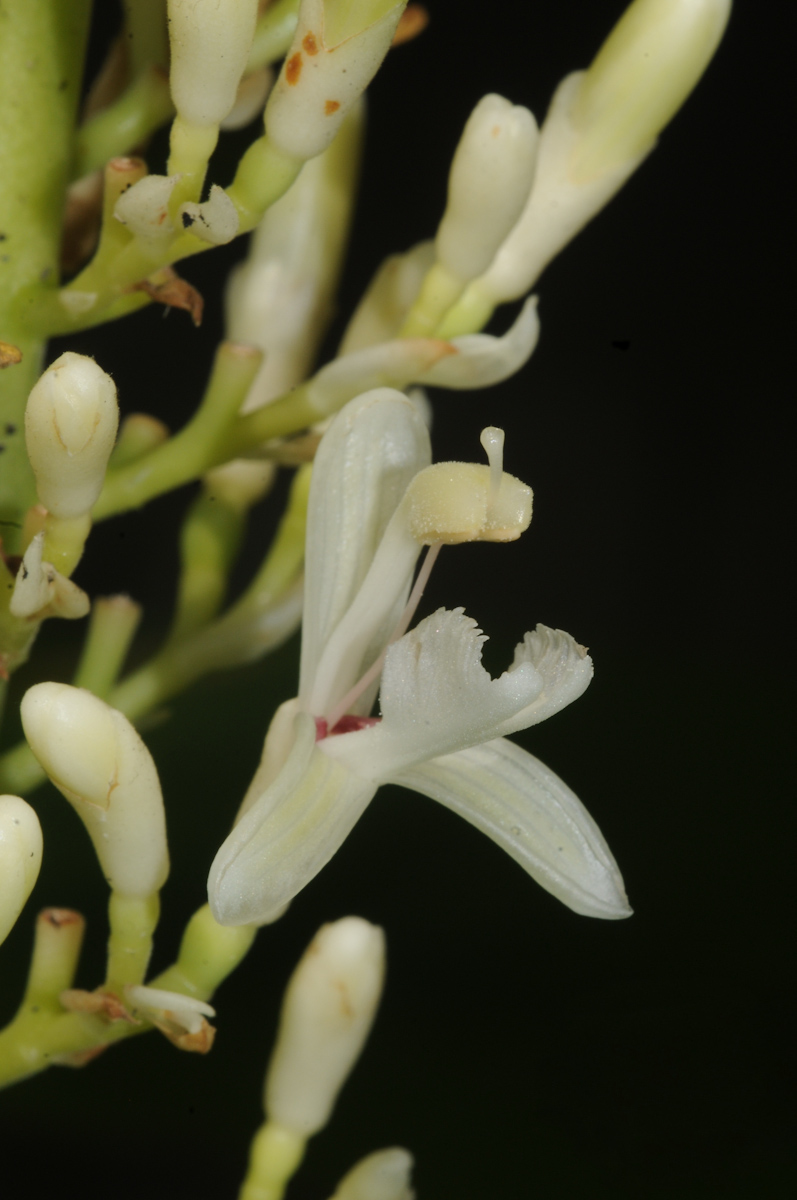
Alpinia galanga (L.) Willd.

Under the names 'chewing John', 'little John to chew', and 'court case root', it is used in African American folk medicine and hoodoo folk magic. In Unani medicine 'A.Galanga' is called as 'Khulanjan' and its actions and uses have been mentioned in many unani classical literatures like Al qanun fittib The Canon of Medicine, maghzanul mufradath etc. It is considered as Muqawwi qalb (cardiac tonic), mufarreh, munaffise balgam, muqawwi meda, muqawwi bah etc. Its used in Asthma, cough, sore throat and other illnesses. Famous unani drug preparations with Khulanjan as an ingredient include Habb e Jadwar, Jawarish Jalinus, Jawarish Ood shirin etc.

Ayurveda considers A. galanga (Sanskrit:-rasna) as a Vata Shamana drug. Known as பேரரத்தை (perarathai) in Tamil, this form of ginger is used with licorice root, called in Tamil athi-mathuram (Glycyrrhiza glabra) as folk medicine for colds and sore throats.

== Chemical constituents ==
Alpinia galanga rhizome contains the flavonol galangin.

The rhizome contains an oil known as galangol, which upon fractional distillation produces cineol (which has medicinal properties), pinene, and eugenol, among others.

== See also ==
- Lesser galangal
- Domesticated plants and animals of Austronesia
