= Baicalin =

Names
- IUPAC name 5,6-Dihydroxy-4-oxoflav-2-en-7-yl β-D-glucopyranosiduronic acid
- Systematic IUPAC name (2S,3S,4S,5R,6S)-6-[(5,6-Dihydroxy-4-oxo-2-phenyl-4H-1-benzopyran-7-yl)oxy]-3,4,5-trihydroxyoxane-2-carboxylic acid
- Other names Baicalein 7-O-glucuronide; 5,6-Dihydroxy-4-oxygen-2-phenyl-4H-1-benzopyran-7-β-D-glucopyranose acid

Identifiers
CAS Number	21967-41-9
3D model (JSmol)	Interactive image
Beilstein Reference	70480
ChEBI	CHEBI:2981
ChEMBL	ChEMBL485818
ChemSpider	58507
ECHA InfoCard	100.133.557
EC Number	606-866-1
KEGG	C10025
PubChem CID	64982
UNII	347Q89U4M5
CompTox Dashboard (EPA)	DTXSID701346569
- InChI: InChI=1S/C21H18O11/c22-9-6-10(8-4-2-1-3-5-8)30-11-7-12(14(23)15(24)13(9)11)31-21-18(27)16(25)17(26)19(32-21)20(28)29/h1-7,16-19,21,23-27H,(H,28,29)/t16-,17-,18+,19-,21+/m0/s1 Key: IKIIZLYTISPENI-ZFORQUDYSA-N; InChI=1/C21H18O11/c22-9-6-10(8-4-2-1-3-5-8)30-11-7-12(14(23)15(24)13(9)11)31-21-18(27)16(25)17(26)19(32-21)20(28)29/h1-7,16-19,21,23-27H,(H,28,29)/t16-,17-,18+,19-,21+/m0/s1 Key: IKIIZLYTISPENI-ZFORQUDYBD
- SMILES: O=C3\C=C(/Oc2cc(O[C@@H]1O[C@H](C(=O)O)[C@@H](O)[C@H](O)[C@H]1O)c(O)c(O)c23)c4ccccc4

Properties
Chemical formula	C_{21}H_{18}O_{11}
Molar mass	446.364 g·mol^{−1}
Melting point	202 to 205 °C (396 to 401 °F; 475 to 478 K)

Hazards
- GHS labelling
Pictograms	(GHS07: Exclamation mark)
Signal word	Warning
Hazard statements	H315, H319, H335
Precautionary statements	P261, P264, P271, P280, P302+P352, P304+P340, P305+P351+P338, P312, P321, P332+P313, P337+P313, P362, P403+P233, P405, P501
- Except where otherwise noted, data are given for materials in their standard state (at 25 °C [77 °F], 100 kPa). Infobox references

Baicalin is the glucuronide of the polyphenolic compound baicalein.

== Natural occurrences ==
Baicalin is found in several species in the genus Scutellaria, including Scutellaria baicalensis, and Scutellaria lateriflora. There are 10 mg/g baicalin in Scutellaria galericulata leaves. It is also present in the bark isolate of the Oroxylum indicum tree.

In Scutellaria baicalensis it is produced from the flavone, baicalein, by the enzyme baicalein 7-O-glucuronosyltransferase which transfers a glucuronic acid sugar unit from UDP-glucuronate.

baicalein
+ UDP-glucuronate
UDP
baicalin

Scutellaria species also contain the enzyme baicalin-β-D-glucuronidase which hydrolyses baicalin to remove the glucoside unit and re-form baicalein.

== Medical uses ==
Baicalin is one of the chemical ingredients of at least two herbal supplements: Shuanghuanglian and Sho-Saiko-To, which is a Chinese classic herbal formula, and listed in Japan as Kampo medicine.

Baicalin, along with its aglycone baicalein, is a positive allosteric modulator of the benzodiazepine site and/or a non-benzodiazepine site of the GABA_{A} receptor. In mice, baicalin produces anxiolytic effects without sedative or myorelaxant effects. It is thought that baicalin, along with other flavonoids, may underlie the anxiolytic effects of S. baicalensis and S. lateriflora.

Baicalin is a known prolyl endopeptidase inhibitor. It induces apoptosis in pancreatic cancer cells.
