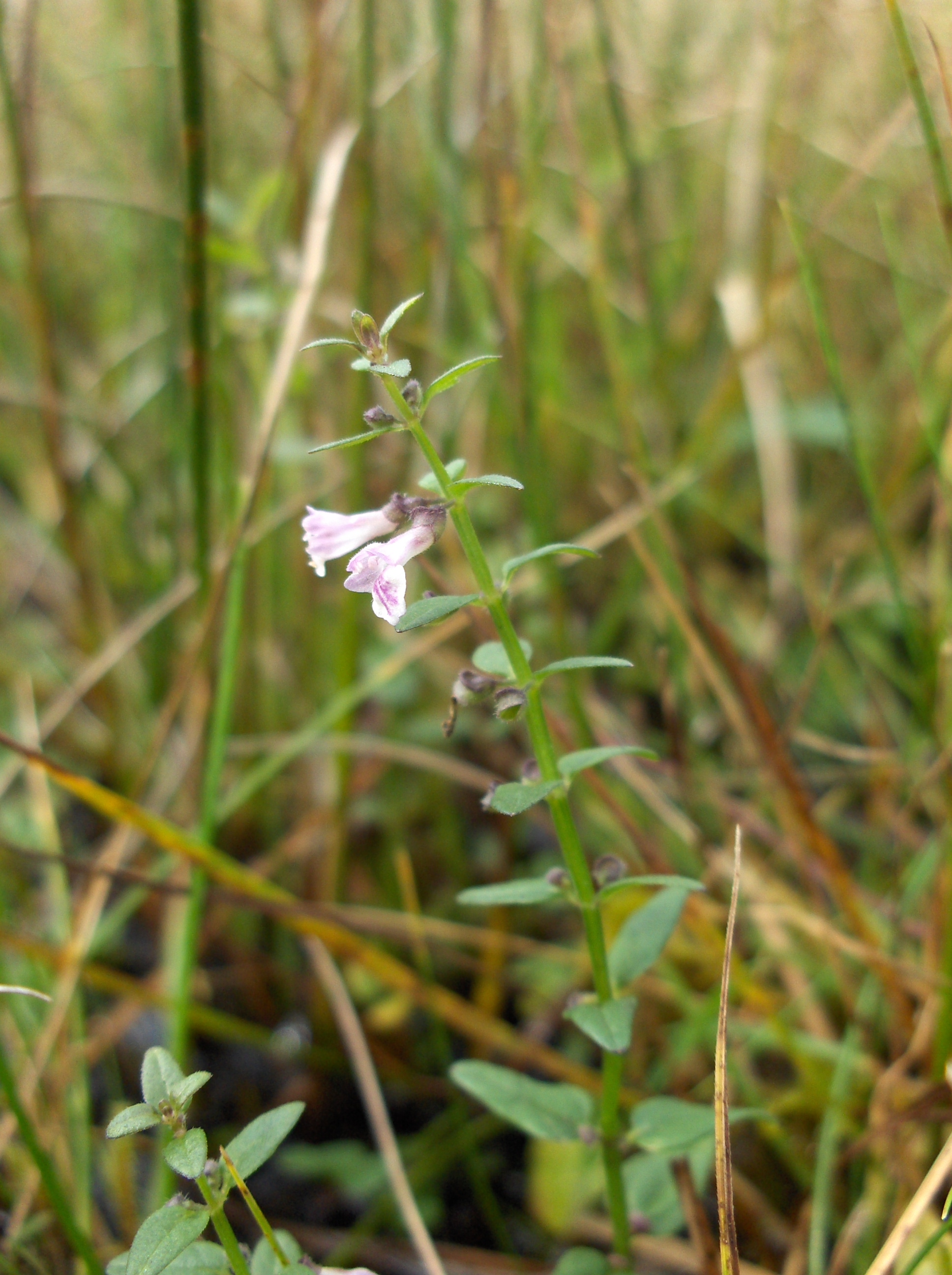

Scientific classification
- Kingdom: Plantae
- Clade: Tracheophytes
- Clade: Angiosperms
- Clade: Eudicots
- Clade: Asterids
- Order: Lamiales
- Family: Lamiaceae
- Genus: Scutellaria
- Species: S. minor

Binomial name
- Scutellaria minor Huds.

= Scutellaria minor =

Species of flowering plant

Scutellaria minor, the lesser skullcap, is a species of flowering plant in the family Lamiaceae.

== Description ==
Scutellaria minor grows to 25 centimetres (9.8 in) tall, with narrowly ovate leaves arranged oppositely. Flowers are borne in the axils of the upper leaves; they have a pinkish purple corolla, 6–10 millimetres (0.24–0.39 in) long.

== Distribution and habitat ==
Scutellaria minor has a southern temperate distribution in Europe. It grows in wet heaths and open woodland on acidic soils. In the British Isles, it is restricted to southern and western areas, extending as far north as the Outer Hebrides.

== Taxonomy ==
Scutellaria minor was first described in 1762 by William Hudson in his Flora Anglica. Hybrids with S. galericulata, known as Scutellaria × hybrida, sometimes occur where both parent species co-occur.
