= 7,8,3'-Trihydroxyflavone =

Chemical compound

Clinical data
- Other names: 7,8,3'-THF
- ATC code: None

Identifiers
- IUPAC name: 7,8-Dihydroxy-2-(3-hydroxyphenyl)chromen-4-one
- CAS Number: 137502-84-2
- PubChem CID: 676310
- ChemSpider: 589045
- UNII: F67B8S3MH9
- ChEMBL: ChEMBL225513
- CompTox Dashboard (EPA): DTXSID00350274

Chemical and physical data
- Formula: C_{15}H_{10}O_{5}
- Molar mass: 270.240 g·mol^{−1}
- 3D model (JSmol): Interactive image
- SMILES: C1=CC(=CC(=C1)O)C2=CC(=O)C3=C(O2)C(=C(C=C3)O)O
- InChI: InChI=1S/C15H10O5/c16-9-3-1-2-8(6-9)13-7-12(18)10-4-5-11(17)14(19)15(10)20-13/h1-7,16-17,19H; Key:ZJZSQGDOCUHCCW-UHFFFAOYSA-N

7,8,3′-Trihydroxyflavone (7,8,3'-THF) is a flavone and small-molecule agonist of TrkB, the main receptor of brain-derived neurotrophic factor (BDNF), that was derived from tropoflavin (7,8-DHF). Relative to tropoflavin, 7,8,3'-THF is 2–3-fold more potent in vitro as a TrkB agonist. 7,3'-Dihydroxyflavone (7,3'-DHF) is also more potent than tropoflavin in vitro, indicating that a 3'-hydroxy group on the B-ring enhances TrkB agonistic activity. 7,8,3'-THF has been tested in vivo and was found to produce TrkB-dependent neuroprotective effects in mice similarly to tropoflavin.

== See also ==
- Tropomyosin receptor kinase B § Agonists
