= Galangin =

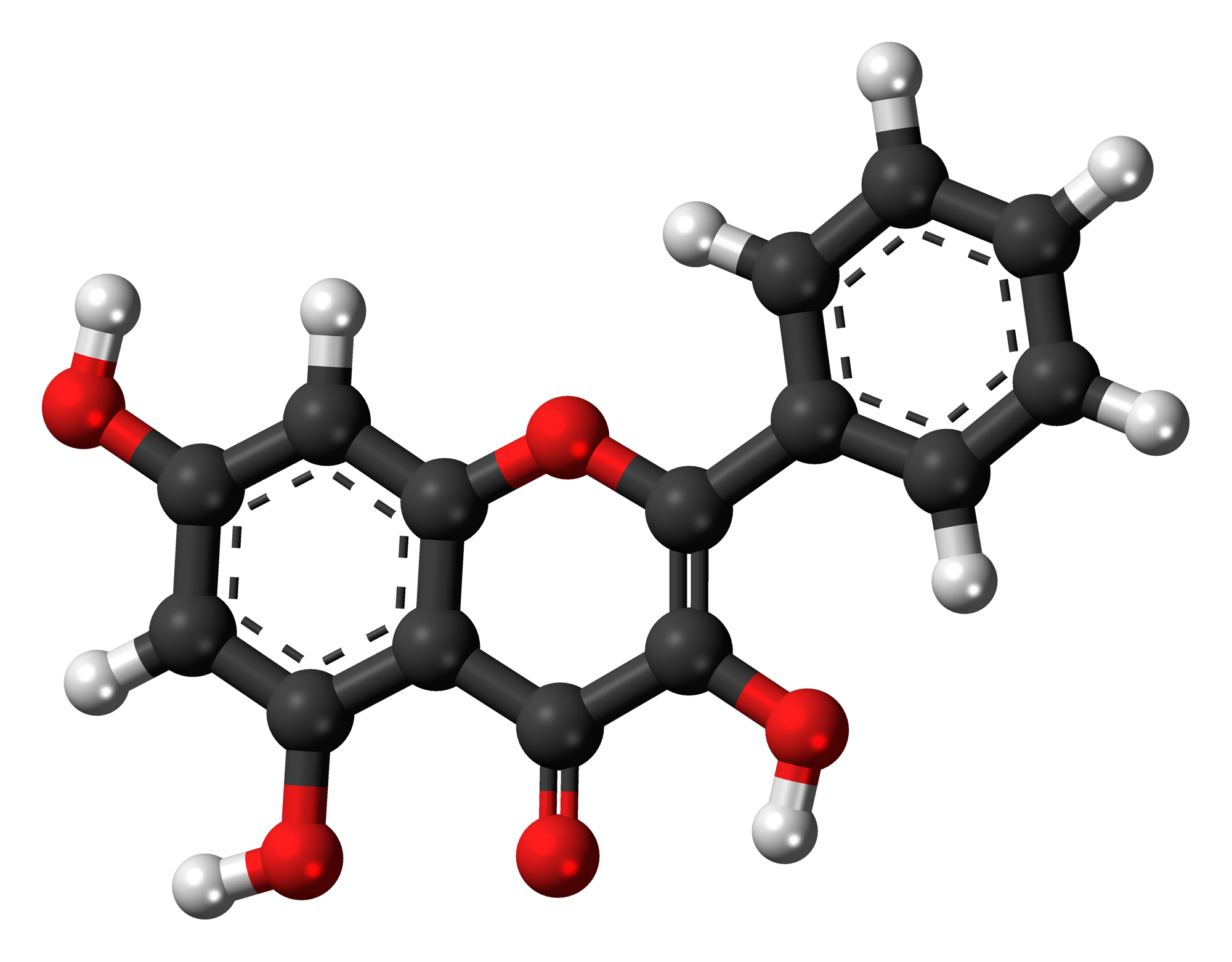

Names
- IUPAC name 3,5,7-Trihydroxyflavone
- Systematic IUPAC name 3,5,7-Trihydroxy-2-phenyl-4H-1-benzopyran-4-one
- Other names Norizalpinin; 3,5,7-triOH-Flavone

Identifiers
CAS Number	548-83-4
3D model (JSmol)	Interactive image
ChEBI	CHEBI:5262
ChEMBL	ChEMBL309490
ChemSpider	4444935
ECHA InfoCard	100.008.147
IUPHAR/BPS	410
KEGG	C10044
PubChem CID	5281616
UNII	142FWE6ECS
CompTox Dashboard (EPA)	DTXSID70203288
- InChI: InChI=1S/C15H10O5/c16-9-6-10(17)12-11(7-9)20-15(14(19)13(12)18)8-4-2-1-3-5-8/h1-7,16-17,19H Key: VCCRNZQBSJXYJD-UHFFFAOYSA-N; InChI=1/C15H10O5/c16-9-6-10(17)12-11(7-9)20-15(14(19)13(12)18)8-4-2-1-3-5-8/h1-7,16-17,19H Key: VCCRNZQBSJXYJD-UHFFFAOYAC
- SMILES: O=C1c3c(O/C(=C1/O)c2ccccc2)cc(O)cc3O

Properties
Chemical formula	C_{15}H_{10}O_{5}
Molar mass	270.240 g·mol^{−1}
Density	1.579 g/mL
Melting point	214 to 215 °C (417 to 419 °F; 487 to 488 K)
- Except where otherwise noted, data are given for materials in their standard state (at 25 °C [77 °F], 100 kPa). verify (what is ?) Infobox references

Galangin is a flavonol, a type of flavonoid.

== Occurrence ==
Galangin is found in high concentrations in plants like Alpinia officinarum (lesser galangal) and Helichrysum aureonitens. It is also found in the rhizome of Alpinia galanga and in propolis.

== Biological activities ==
Galangin has been shown to have in vitro antibacterial and antiviral activity. It also inhibits the growth of breast tumor cells in vitro.
