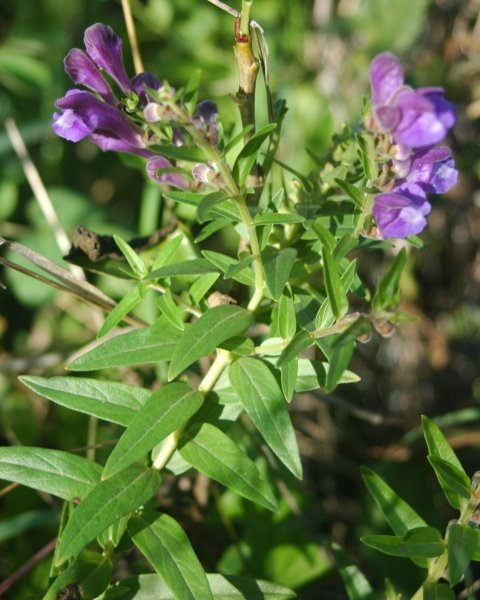

Scientific classification
- Kingdom: Plantae
- Clade: Tracheophytes
- Clade: Angiosperms
- Clade: Eudicots
- Clade: Asterids
- Order: Lamiales
- Family: Lamiaceae
- Genus: Scutellaria
- Species: S. baicalensis

Binomial name
- Scutellaria baicalensis Georgi

Synonyms
- Scutellaria macrantha Fisch.

= Scutellaria baicalensis =

Species of flowering plant

Scutellaria baicalensis, with the common name Baikal skullcap or Chinese skullcap, is a species of flowering plant in the family Lamiaceae.

== Distribution ==
The plant is native to China, Korea, Mongolia, and Russia in the Russian Far East and Siberia.

== Traditional Chinese medicine ==
It is one of the 50 fundamental herbs used in traditional Chinese medicine, where it has the name huángqín (Chinese: 黄芩). As a Chinese traditional medicine, huang qin usually refers to the dried root of S. baicalensis Georgi, S. viscidula Bge., S. amoena C.H. Wright, and S. ikoninkovii Ju.

=== Phytochemicals ===
Several phytochemicals have been isolated from the root; baicalein, baicalin, wogonin, norwogonin, oroxylin A and β-sitosterol are the major ones.

=== Names ===
As the term 'skullcap' is applied to over 200 plant varieties, the scientific name is used. Sometimes, Scutellaria lateriflora (North American skullcap) is mistaken for S. baicalensis.

=== Adverse effects ===
There have been several reports and small case series of acute liver injury with jaundice arising 1 to 3 months after starting herbal or dietary supplements containing S. baicalensis.

== See also ==
- Piper methysticum (kava), another anxiolytic GABAergic plant
- Valeriana officinalis (valerian), a sedative GABAergic plant
