= Norwogonin =

Chemical compound

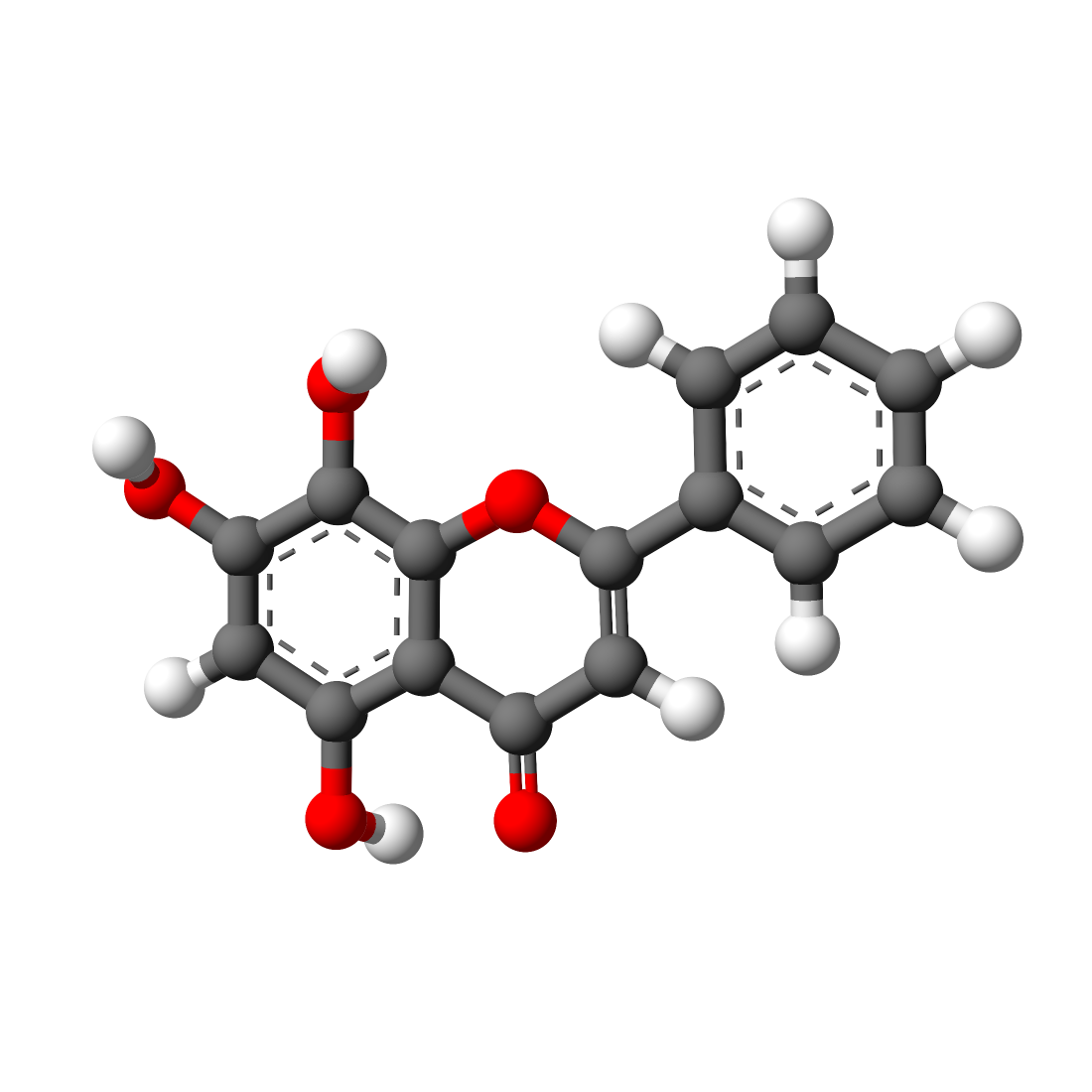

Clinical data
- Other names: 5,7,8-Trihydroxyflavone; 5,7,8-THF

Identifiers
- IUPAC name: 5,7,8-trihydroxy-2-phenylchromen-4-one
- CAS Number: 4443-09-8
- PubChem CID: 5281674
- ChemSpider: 4444993
- UNII: 70U0WT21IB
- KEGG: C10113
- ChEBI: CHEBI:7642
- ChEMBL: ChEMBL485250
- CompTox Dashboard (EPA): DTXSID20196171

Chemical and physical data
- Formula: C_{15}H_{10}O_{5}
- Molar mass: 270.240 g·mol^{−1}
- 3D model (JSmol): Interactive image
- SMILES: C1=CC=C(C=C1)C2=CC(=O)C3=C(O2)C(=C(C=C3O)O)O
- InChI: InChI=1S/C15H10O5/c16-9-6-11(18)14(19)15-13(9)10(17)7-12(20-15)8-4-2-1-3-5-8/h1-7,16,18-19H; Key:ZFKKRRMUPBBYRS-UHFFFAOYSA-N

Norwogonin, also known as 5,7,8-trihydroxyflavone (5,7,8-THF), is a flavone, a naturally occurring flavonoid-like chemical compound which is found in Scutellaria baicalensis (Baikal skullcap). It has been found to act as an agonist of the TrkB, the main signaling receptor of brain-derived neurotrophic factor (BDNF), and appears to possess roughly the same activity in this regard to that of the closely related but more well-known tropoflavin (7,8-DHF).

== See also ==
- Tropomyosin receptor kinase B § Agonists
