= 6,7,4'-Trihydroxyflavone =

Chemical compound

Identifiers
CAS Number	744252-77-5
3D model (JSmol)	Interactive image
ChEMBL	ChEMBL475847
ChemSpider	8531205
PubChem CID	10355753
- InChI: InChI=1S/C15H10O5/c16-9-3-1-8(2-4-9)14-6-11(17)10-5-12(18)13(19)7-15(10)20-14/h1-7,16,18-19H Key: XADJWCRESPGUTB-UHFFFAOYSA-N
- SMILES: O=C1C=C(OC2=CC(O)=C(O)C=C12)C=3C=CC(O)=CC3

Properties
Chemical formula	C_{15}H_{10}O_{5}
Molar mass	270.240 g·mol^{−1}
- Except where otherwise noted, data are given for materials in their standard state (at 25 °C [77 °F], 100 kPa). Infobox references

6,7,4′-Trihydroxyflavone (6,7,4'-THF) is a flavone, a naturally occurring flavonoid-like chemical compound which is found in heartwood of Dalbergia odorifera, which is called "Jiangxiang" in Traditional Chinese medicine.
