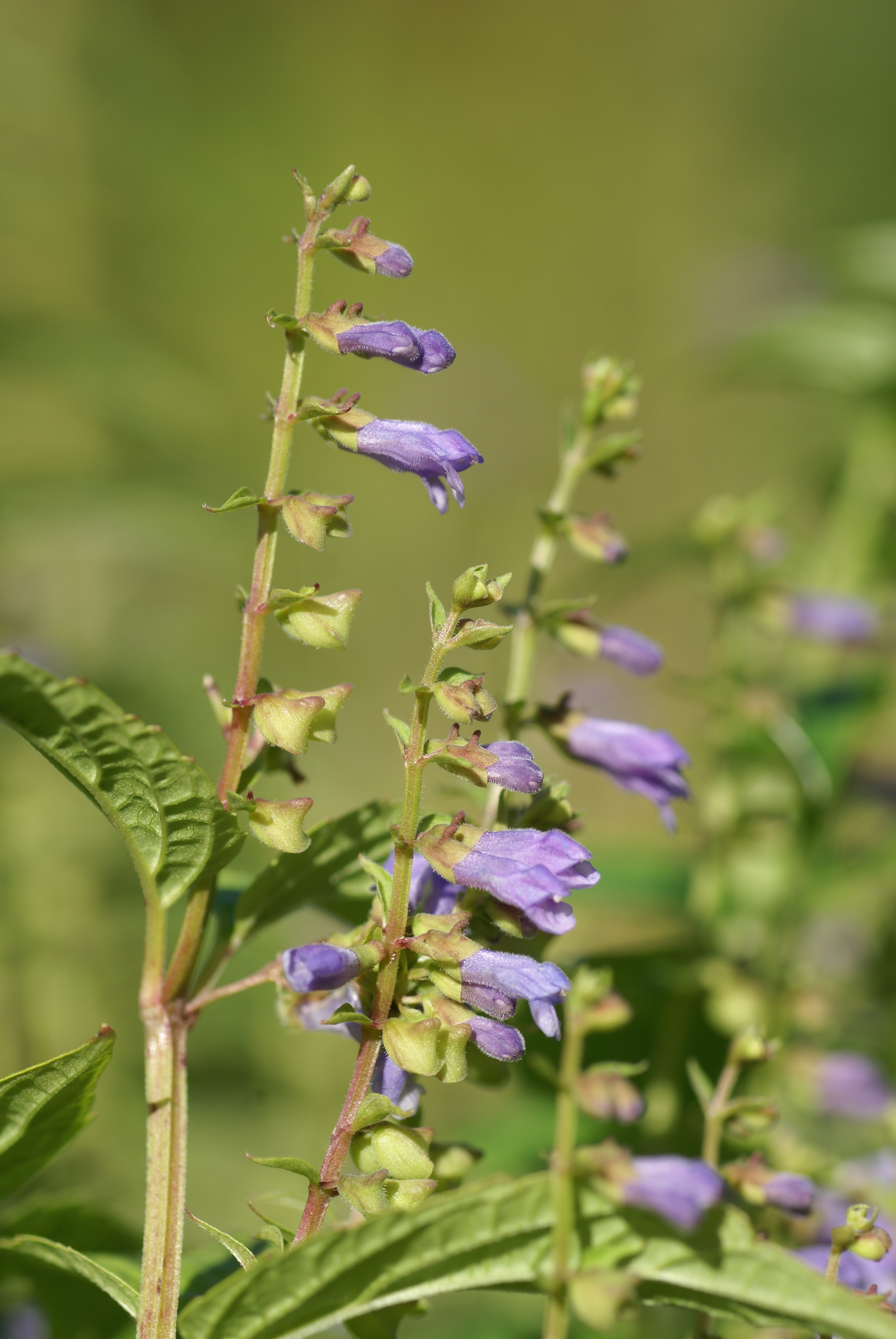

Conservation status
- Least Concern (IUCN 3.1)

- Secure (NatureServe)

Scientific classification
- Kingdom: Plantae
- Clade: Embryophytes
- Clade: Tracheophytes
- Clade: Spermatophytes
- Clade: Angiosperms
- Clade: Eudicots
- Clade: Asterids
- Order: Lamiales
- Family: Lamiaceae
- Genus: Scutellaria
- Species: S. lateriflora

Binomial name
- Scutellaria lateriflora L.

Synonyms
- List: Cassida lateriflora (L.) Moench; Scutellaria lateriflora f. albiflora Fernald; Scutellaria lateriflora var. albiflora Farw.; Scutellaria lateriflora var. axillaris Jenn.; Scutellaria lateriflora f. rhodantha Fernald; Scutellaria polybotrya Bernh.

= Scutellaria lateriflora =

Plant species in the mint family

Scutellaria lateriflora, (commonly "blue skullcap", "mad dog skullcap", "American skullcap", "side-flowering skullcap", etc.) is a hardy perennial herb of the mint family, Lamiaceae, native to North America.

It has an upright habit, growing 60–80 cm (24–31 inches) in maximum height. It is a wetland-loving species and grows near marshes, meadows, and other wet habitats. The blue flowers are just under 1 cm (0.4 inches) long. Most of the flowers do not appear at the top of the main stem but are produced along the length of side branches that grow from the leaf axils.

Other skullcaps (Scutellaria) species include common skullcap (S. galericulata), western skullcap (S. canescens), and southern skullcap (S. cordifolia).

== Phytochemicals ==
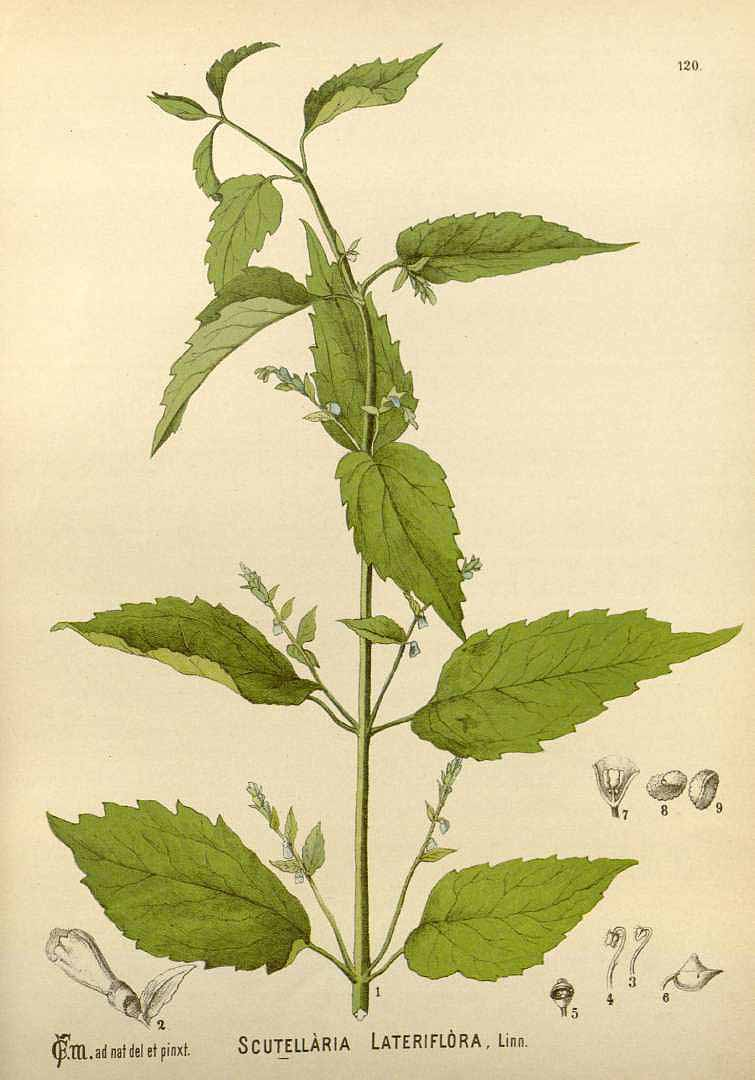
Illustration by Charles Frederick Millspaugh

The principal phytochemicals are polyphenols in the leaves, stems, and roots of some Scutellaria species, including baicalin, baicalein, wogonin, and oroxylin A. Other constituents include lateriflorin, melatonin, serotonin, viscidulin III-2'-O-glucoside, Chyrin-6-C-ara-glc, trans-verbascoside, viscidulin, trans-martynoside, oroxylin A-7-O-glc, wogonoside, chitin, and scutellarin. Scutellaria lateriflora contains flavonoids.

One study identified 5,6,7-trihydroxy-2'- methoxyflavone and its 7-O-glucuronide. Scutellarin is a flavone found in S. lateriflora and S. barbata. It is transformed by hydrolysis into scutellarein.

Genkwanin, hesperetin, quercetin, rutin, naringenin, chrysin, and daidzein are the flavonoids found in S. lateriflora. The flavonoids are readily extracted using hot water.

The oil from S. lateriflora contains τ-cadinene, calamenene, β-elemene, α-cubebene, and α-humulene.

Essential oils
Chemical	Concentration (mg/g)
alpha-cubebene	42
alpha-humulene	42
beta-elemene	92
calamenene	152
delta-cadinene	270

Other constituents
Chemical	Concentration (mg/g)
carbohydrates	780
ascorbic acid	1
baicalin	10
scutellarin	
scutellarein	
tannin	28-35
wax	12

== Traditional uses and research ==
Its extracts are used in herbal medicine intended as a mild sedative and sleep promoter. Cherokee women have used it as an emmenagogue. In 1773, Scutellaria lateriflora became a common treatment in North America for the hysteria and hydrophobia caused by rabies.

Skullcap products have been analyzed, with some adulterated by Teucrium canadense or T. chamaedrys, also known as germander, which contains potentially hepatotoxic diterpenes.
