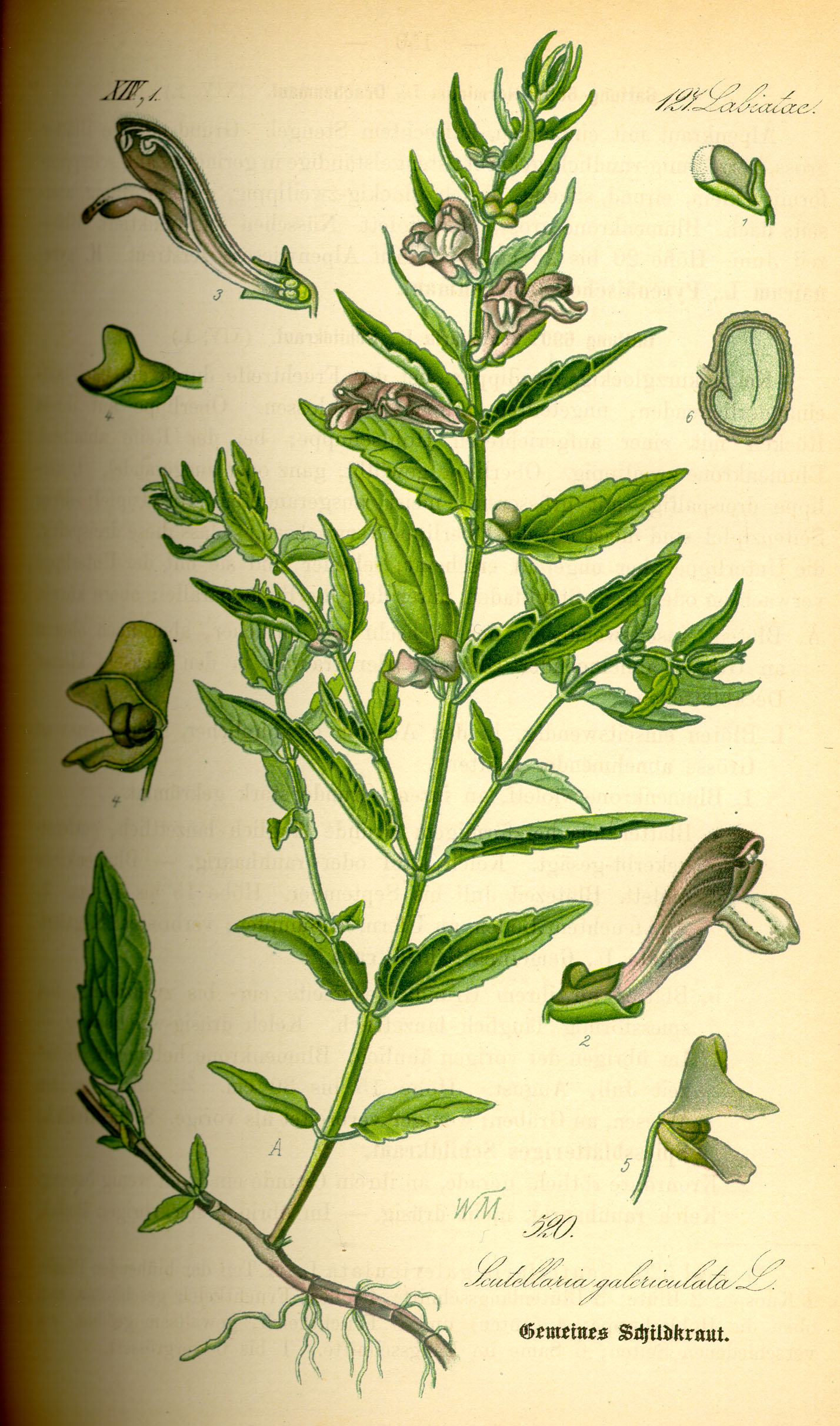
- 1885 illustration

Conservation status
- Least Concern (IUCN 3.1)

- Secure (NatureServe)

Scientific classification
- Kingdom: Plantae
- Clade: Tracheophytes
- Clade: Angiosperms
- Clade: Eudicots
- Clade: Asterids
- Order: Lamiales
- Family: Lamiaceae
- Genus: Scutellaria
- Species: S. galericulata

Binomial name
- Scutellaria galericulata L.

Synonyms
- List: Cassida galericulata (L.) Scop.; Cassida major Gilib.; Scutellaria adamsii Spreng.; Scutellaria epilobiifolia A.Ham.; Scutellaria epilobiifolia f. albiflora Fernald; Scutellaria epilobiifolia f. rosea Fernald; Scutellaria galericulata f. albiflora Millsp.; Scutellaria galericulata var. epilobiifolia (A.Ham.) Jordal; Scutellaria galericulata var. glaberrima Benth.; Scutellaria galericulata var. humilis Tinant; Scutellaria galericulata var. pauciflora (Pant.) Nyman; Scutellaria galericulata var. pubens Crép.; Scutellaria galericulata var. pubescens Mutel; Scutellaria galericulata f. rosea E.L.Rand & Redfield; Scutellaria galericulata f. uberrima C.G.Westerl.; Scutellaria galericulata var. vulgaris Benth.; Scutellaria pauciflora Pant.

= Scutellaria galericulata =

Plant species in the mint family

Scutellaria galericulata, the common skullcap, marsh skullcap or hooded skullcap, is a hardy perennial herb native to northern areas of the Northern Hemisphere, including Europe, Asia, and almost all of Canada. It is a member of the mint family. The form is upright and is usually 20-45 centimeters in height, sometimes reaching up to 80 cm. It is a wetland-loving species and grows along fens and shorelines. The blue flowers are 1 to 2 centimeters long. The flowers are in pairs and are all on the same side of the stem. The flowers do not appear at the top of the stem.

The plant is native to many parts of the world and, as such, is known by a variety of names. The Latin galericulata means "hooded", relating to the length of the flower's tube being much longer than the calyx. The variation epilobiifolia translates as leaves like willow-herb, and refers to the slightly serrated long thin leaves which look similar to those of the genus Epilobium.

== Medicinal uses ==
The genus Scutellaria has numerous medicinal uses and various species of skullcap are used in the same way. The traditional uses of common skullcap should not be confused with those of other Skullcaps as there are over 200 different species of Skullcap and they are not all used in the same way. Blue skullcap (S. lateriflora) is accepted as the "skullcap" used in traditional North American medicine, however common skullcap shares many of the same active chemicals and is used as a substitute in Britain and Europe. Common skullcap (S. galericulata) is also often used in the same way as Western skullcap (S. canescens) and Southern skullcap (S. cordifolia), all of which are genetically similar.

Blue skullcap and common skullcap are mainly known for their traditional use as mild anxiolytics in the form of herbal teas, tablets, capsules, dried leaf for smoking and oral liquid preparations, often in combination with other medicinal herbs. The aqueous extract of the flowering parts have been traditionally used by Native Americans as a nerve tonic and for its sedative and diuretic properties.

== Pharmacology ==
Main chemical constituents
Chemical	Part	Concentration (mg/g)
baicalin	Leaf	10
chrysin-7-glucuronide	Plant	27
tannin	Plant	28-35

It is used in skin lightening.

== See also ==
- Valerian (herb)
