= Baicalein =

Polyphenol compound

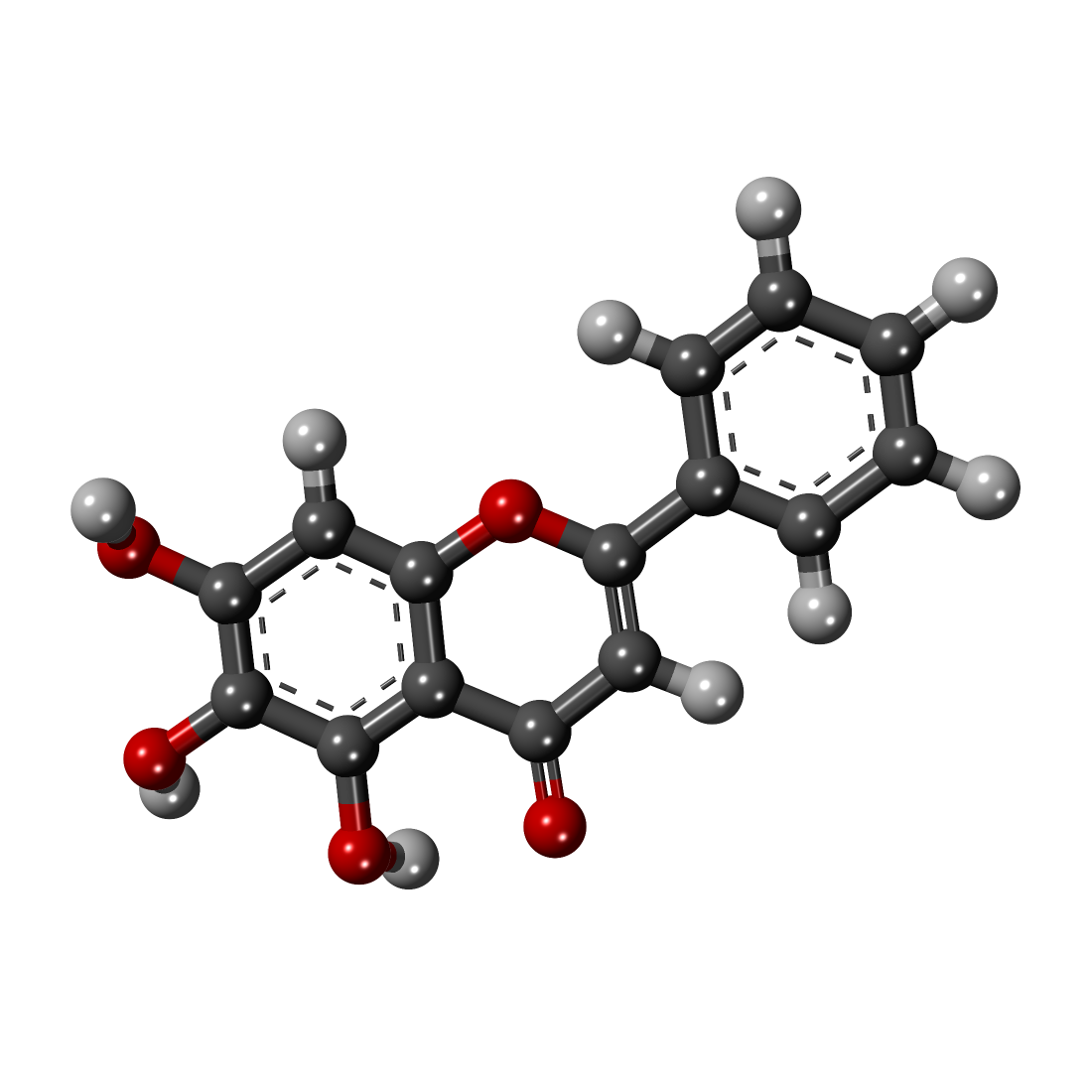

Clinical data
- Other names: Biacalein; Noroxylin

Identifiers
- IUPAC name: 5,6,7-trihydroxy-2-phenyl-4H-1-benzopyran-4-one
- CAS Number: 491-67-8
- PubChem CID: 5281605
- IUPHAR/BPS: 5144
- ChemSpider: 4444924
- UNII: 49QAH60606
- KEGG: C10023
- ChEBI: CHEBI:2979
- ChEMBL: ChEMBL8260
- CompTox Dashboard (EPA): DTXSID2022389
- ECHA InfoCard: 100.164.911

Chemical and physical data
- Formula: C_{15}H_{10}O_{5}
- Molar mass: 270.240 g·mol^{−1}
- 3D model (JSmol): Interactive image
- SMILES: O=C\1c3c(O)c(O)c(O)cc3O/C(=C/1)c2ccccc2
- InChI: InChI=1S/C15H10O5/c16-9-6-11(8-4-2-1-3-5-8)20-12-7-10(17)14(18)15(19)13(9)12/h1-7,17-19H; Key:FXNFHKRTJBSTCS-UHFFFAOYSA-N

Baicalein (5,6,7-trihydroxyflavone) is a flavone, a type of flavonoid, originally isolated from the roots of Scutellaria baicalensis and Scutellaria lateriflora. It is also a constituent of Oroxylum indicum (Indian trumpetflower) and thyme. It is the aglycone of baicalin.

== Pharmacology ==
Baicalein, along with its glucuronide baicalin, is a positive allosteric modulator of the benzodiazepine site and a non-benzodiazepine site of the GABA_{A} receptor, but with an affinity over 250× lower than diazepam. It displays subtype selectivity for α_{2} and α_{3} subunit-containing GABA_{A} receptors.

The flavonoid has been shown to inhibit certain types of lipoxygenases.

Baicalein is an inhibitor of CYP2C9, an enzyme of the cytochrome P450 system that metabolizes drugs in the body.

A derivative of baicalin is a known prolyl endopeptidase inhibitor.

== See also ==
- List of compounds with carbon number 15
