= Tom yum kung =

Thai spicy and sour shrimp soup

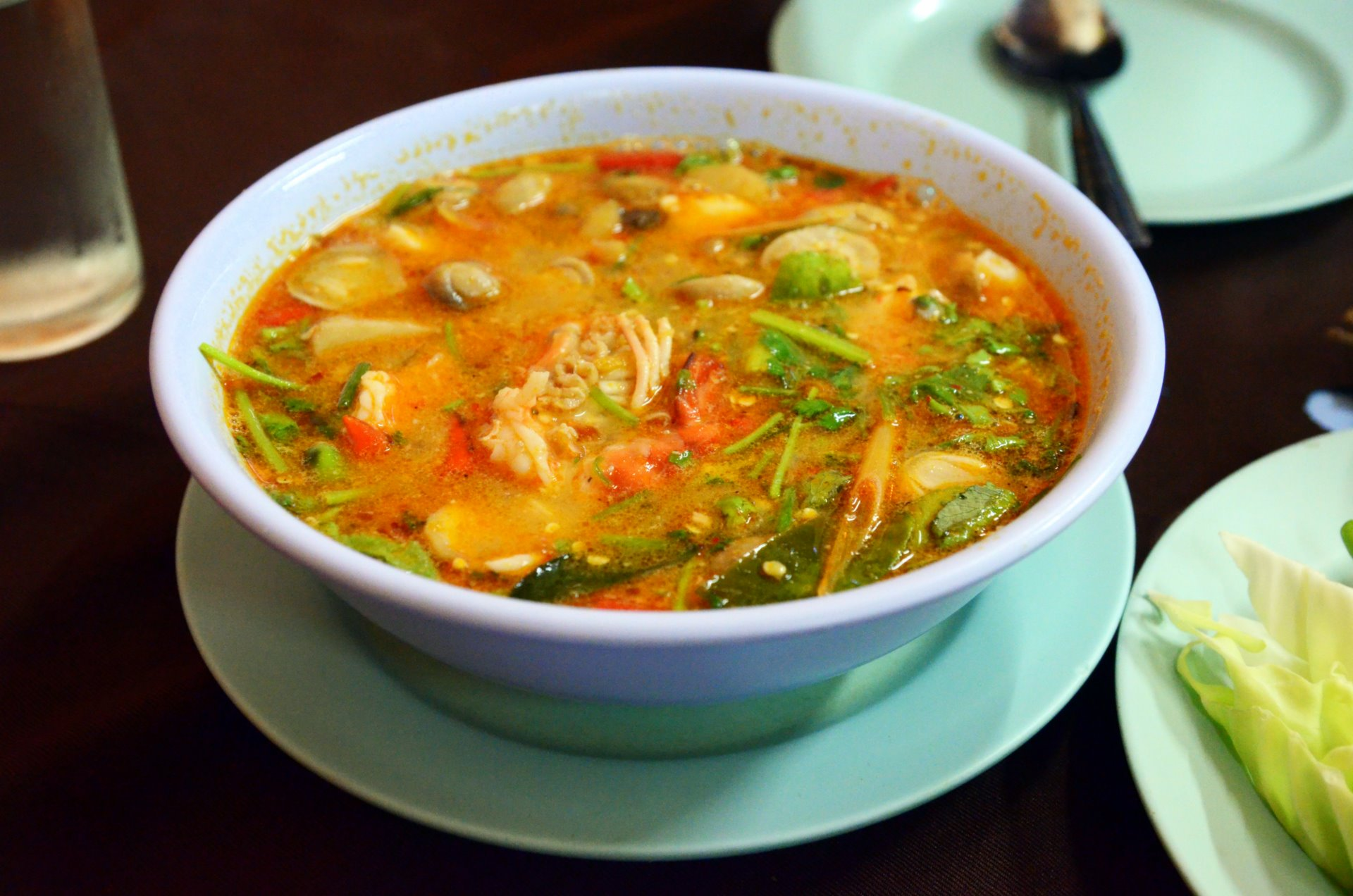
- Tom yum kung as served in bowl in Bangkok
- Alternative names: Tom yum kung nam khon; Tom yum kung nam sai
- Type: Soup
- Course: Lunch
- Place of origin: Central Thailand
- Region or state: Southeast Asia
- Associated cuisine: Thai
- Serving temperature: Hot
- Main ingredients: Shrimp, Broth, lemongrass, kaffir lime leaves, galangal, lime juice, fish sauce, chili peppers
- Food energy (per 244 g serving): 50 kcal (210 kJ)
Nutritional value
(per 244 g serving)
- Protein: 7.9 g
- Fat: 0.7 g
- Carbohydrate: 53 g

Tomyum Kung
- UNESCO Intangible Cultural Heritage
- Country: Thailand
- Reference: 01879
- Region: Asia and the Pacific

Inscription history
- Inscription: 2024 (19th session)
- List: Representative

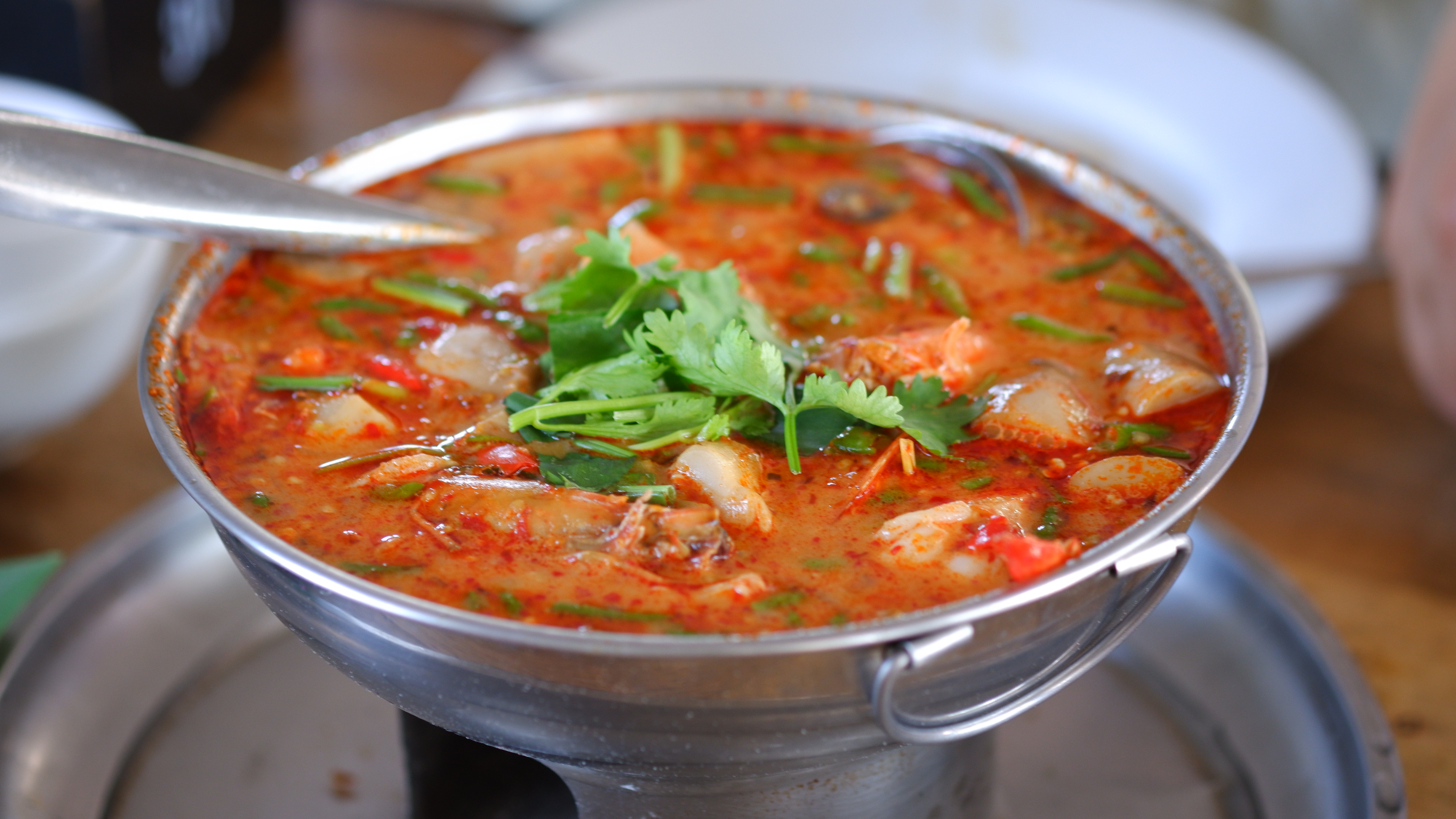
Tom yum kung as served in a hot pot in Rayong, Thailand.

Tom yum kung, or Tom yum goong, (Thai: ต้มยำกุ้ง RTGS: tom yam kung) is the Thai spicy and sour shrimp soup—a variant of Tom yum, combined with many of Thailand's key herbal and seasoning ingredients, often served with a side of steamed rice, sometimes with a dollop of chili paste and a splash of lime juice, enhancing its spicy and tangy profile. Presently, there are two profiles of Tom yum kung recipes: Tom yum kung nam khon—a creamy broth with mellow and smooth flavor, and Tom yum kung nam sai—a clear broth with a stronger flavor.

== Etymology ==
In Thai, the term tom yum kung is a compound word of tom yum + kung. The term tom yum, which means spicy and sour soup, is a combination of two Proto-Tai words: *tom 'v. to cook in water, boil' + *yum, *yam 'v. to mix together or n. salad.' And the term kung, goong means prawn, shrimp, and crayfish.

=== Variant names ===
In Chinese, the term dongyingong (Chinese: 冬荫功) is a loanword which is derived from the Thai terms tom yum, tom yam 'cooked in sweet and sour' + kung, goong 'prawn.'

The term tom yum kung is also written in various languages, such as tom yang kung (Korean: 똠양꿍), tomu yamu kun (Japanese: トムヤムクン), and in Burmese yodaya hinjo.

== History ==
The origin of Tom yum kung is deeply connected to the environment and way of life of the Thai people, who have been establishing riverside communities in the central plains and upper part of the Chao Phraya River basin since the Ayutthaya period.

The traditional Tom yum kung recipe first appeared based on written evidence as Tom yum kung song khrueng—extra ingredients Tom yum kung spicy and sour shrimp soup in 1898, found in the book the Lexicon Dictionary of Sweet and Savory Recipes in Western and Siamese Styles compiled by students of Harriet M. House School For Girls at Wang Lang in Bangkok (now Wattana Wittaya Academy), which is different from today's Tom yum kung recipe.

The Tom yum kung recipe, which is similar to the modern Tom yum kung, first appeared in 1964 in the Food of the Royal book officially recorded by M.R. Kitinadda Kitiyakara, the former Thai secretary of the privy council in the reign of King Bhumibol Adulyadej (Rama IX). Therefore, based on the evidence, it is possible that Thai people have had recipes similar to Tom Yum Kung since the reign of King Chulalongkorn (Rama V) or earlier in the Rattanakosin period.

In 2011, Tom yum kung was registered as a National Cultural Heritage (NCH) of Thailand under the domain of knowledge and practice concerning nature and the universe in the food and consumption category.

In 2024, Tom yum kung was inscribed on the Representative List of UNESCO Intangible Cultural Heritage of Humanity (RL) on 3 December by the Nineteenth Session of the Intergovernmental Committee for the Safeguarding of the Intangible Cultural Heritage (ICS-ICH) in Asunción, Paraguay.

== Ingredients ==
Tom yum kung contains fresh key ingredients, including medium to large shrimp, lemongrass, kaffir lime leaves, galangal (Alpinia galanga), fresh lime juice, chili pepper, tomato, shallot, mushrooms (straw, button, or oyster), cilantro for garnish, chicken or shrimp stock, Nam phrik phao (Thai chili paste), fish sauce, sugar, and kitchen salt. The creamy broth profile also adds coconut or evaporated milk.

== Variations ==
There are two profiles of Tom yum kung:

- Nam khon (creamy broth) began in the reign of King Vajiravudh (Rama VI) from 1910 to 1925. The profile has a smooth flavor thickened with coconut milk or evaporated milk.
- Nam sai (clear broth) is a traditional profile that is stronger and has a more intense flavor.

== Medicinal properties ==
Tom yum kung not only contains many key ingredients—full of cold-curing herbs such as galangal, lemongrass, lime juice, kaffir lime leaves, crushed red chili peppers, and other herbs with properties 100 times more effective than other antioxidants in inhibiting cancerous-tumor growth—but also a true "super soup" in the variant of Tom yum. The components that have been shown to help reduce the deterioration of the nervous system and neurodegenerative disease, enhance the functions of the immune system, prevent cancers, and have anti-inflammatory and microbial properties. It is an effective remedy for combating cold and flu viruses.

== In popular cultures ==
The name of Tom yum kung appears in various contemporary cultures and media as follows:

- Tom-Yum-Goong (2005 Thai film)
- Tom Yum Goong 2 (2013 Thai film)
- Tom yum kung crisis (1997 Asian financial crisis)

== See also ==
- Tom yum
- Thai cuisine
- National dish
- List of Thai ingredients
- List of Intangible Cultural Heritage elements in Thailand
