= Tom kha kai =

Thai coconut milk and chicken soup

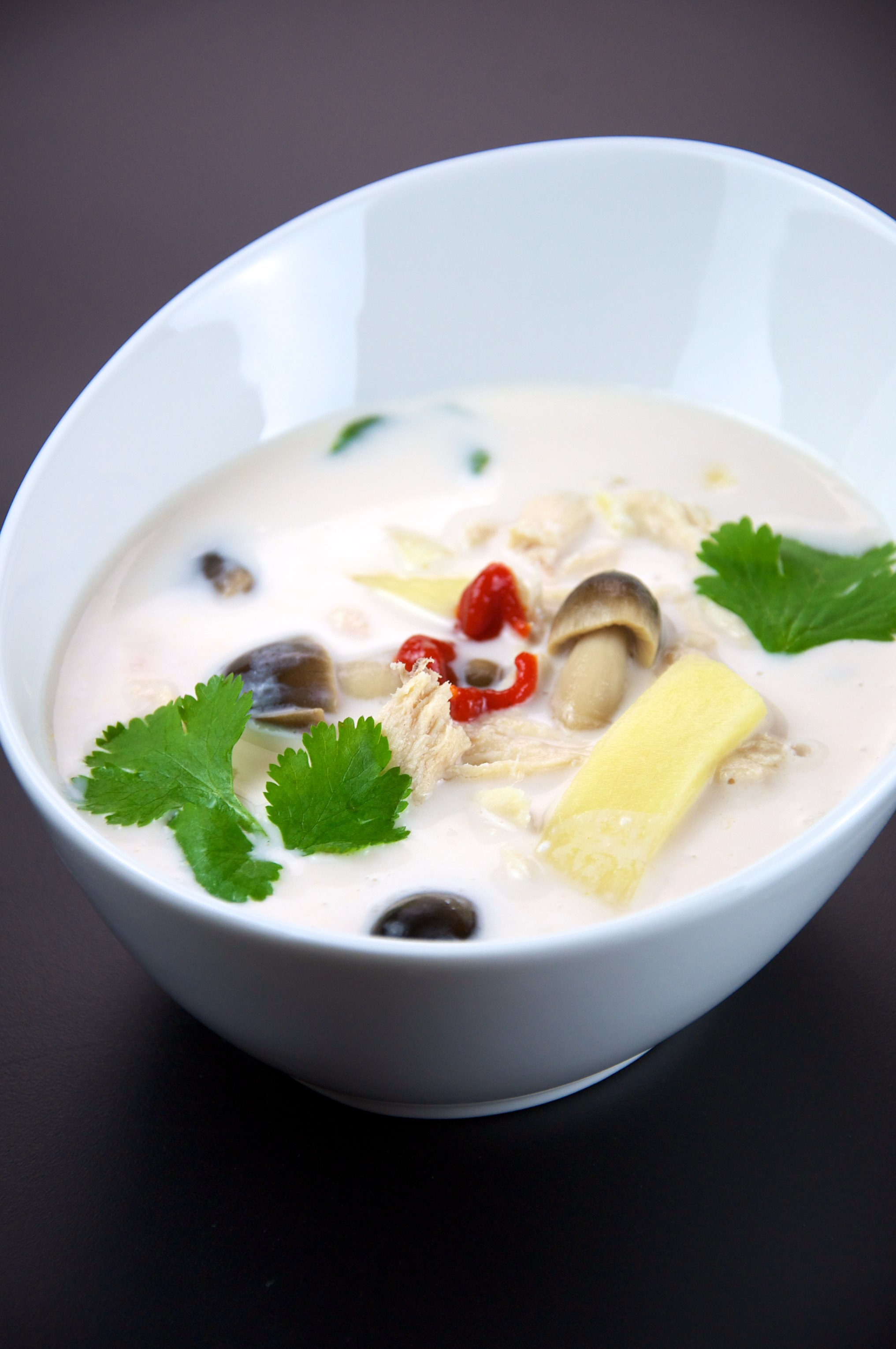
- Alternative names: Chicken coconut soup, galangal soup
- Type: Soup
- Place of origin: Thailand
- Associated cuisine: Thailand
- Serving temperature: Hot
- Main ingredients: Coconut milk, galangal, lemon grass, kaffir lime leaves, mushrooms and chicken

Tom kha kai, tom kha gai, or Thai coconut soup (Thai: ต้มข่าไก่, pronounced [tôm kʰàː kàj]; lit. 'chicken galangal soup') is a spicy and sour hot soup with coconut milk in Thai cuisine.

== History ==
Tom kha is a Thai soup that originated around 1890 and was first recorded in a Thai recipe book. The earliest recorded version of the soup was called tom kha pet, and it featured duck and young galangal in a coconut milk-based curry. Over time, chicken became a more popular protein choice and the dish evolved into the version known as tom kha kai, which is made with chicken instead of duck. In addition to chicken, shrimp is also a popular protein option and is often referred to as tom kha kung. Tom kha shares many base ingredients with another popular Thai soup called tom yam. However, tom kha is distinguished by the addition of coconut milk, which lends it a creamy texture and a milder, sweeter taste compared to tom yam.

== Ingredients ==
Tom kha kai recipes typically include coconut milk, galangal (sometimes substituted with ginger), kaffir lime leaves, lemongrass, Thai chili, coriander (or cilantro), straw mushrooms (or shiitake or other mushrooms), chicken, fish sauce, and lime juice. Fried chilies are sometimes added.

== Variations ==
There are other versions of tom kha kai made with seafood (tom kha thale, Thai: ต้มข่าทะเล), mushrooms (tom kha het, Thai: ต้มข่าเห็ด), pork (tom kha mu, Thai: ต้มข่าหมู) and tofu (tom kha taohu, Thai: ต้มข่าเต้าหู้).

== Gallery ==
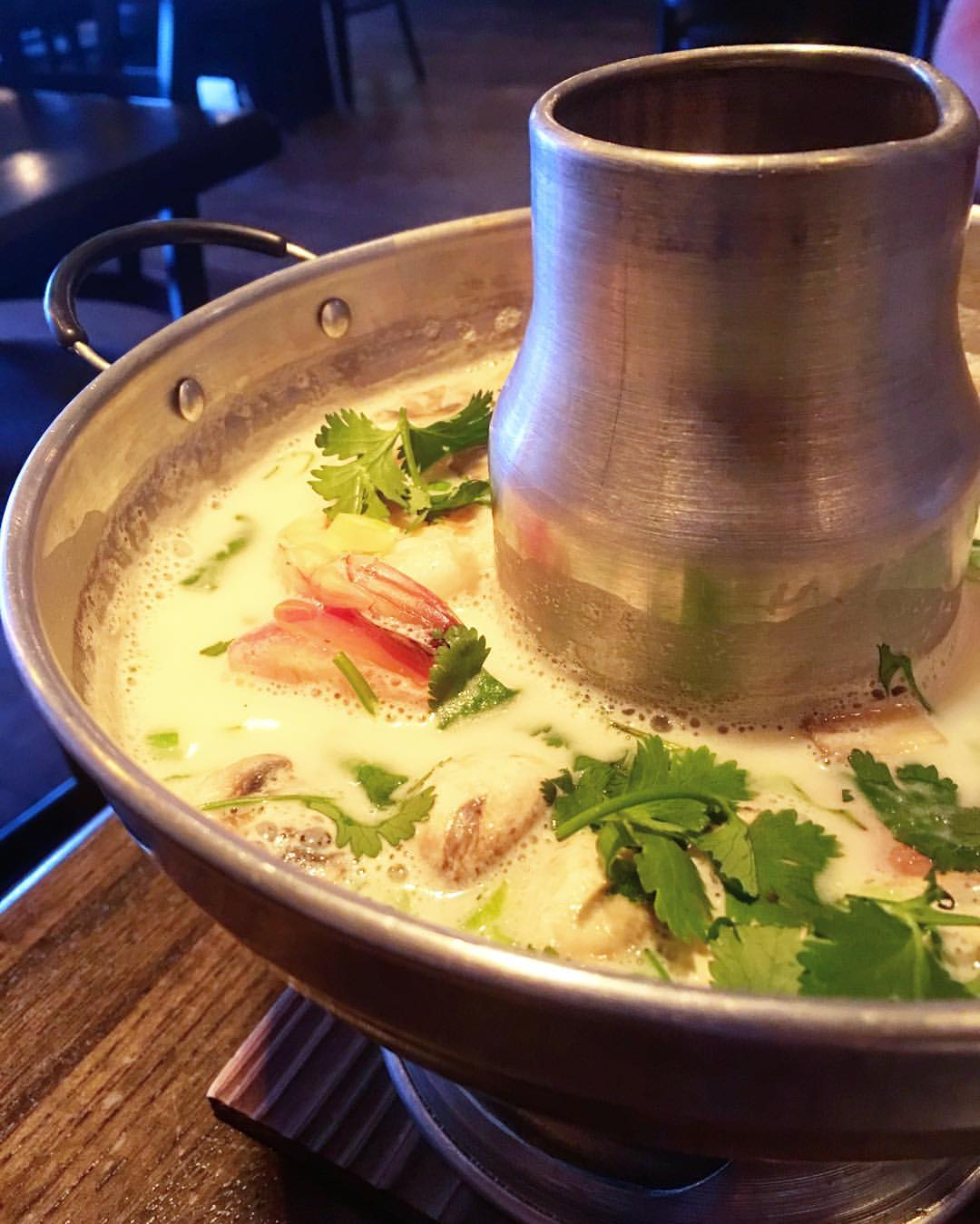
Tom kha kai at a restaurant

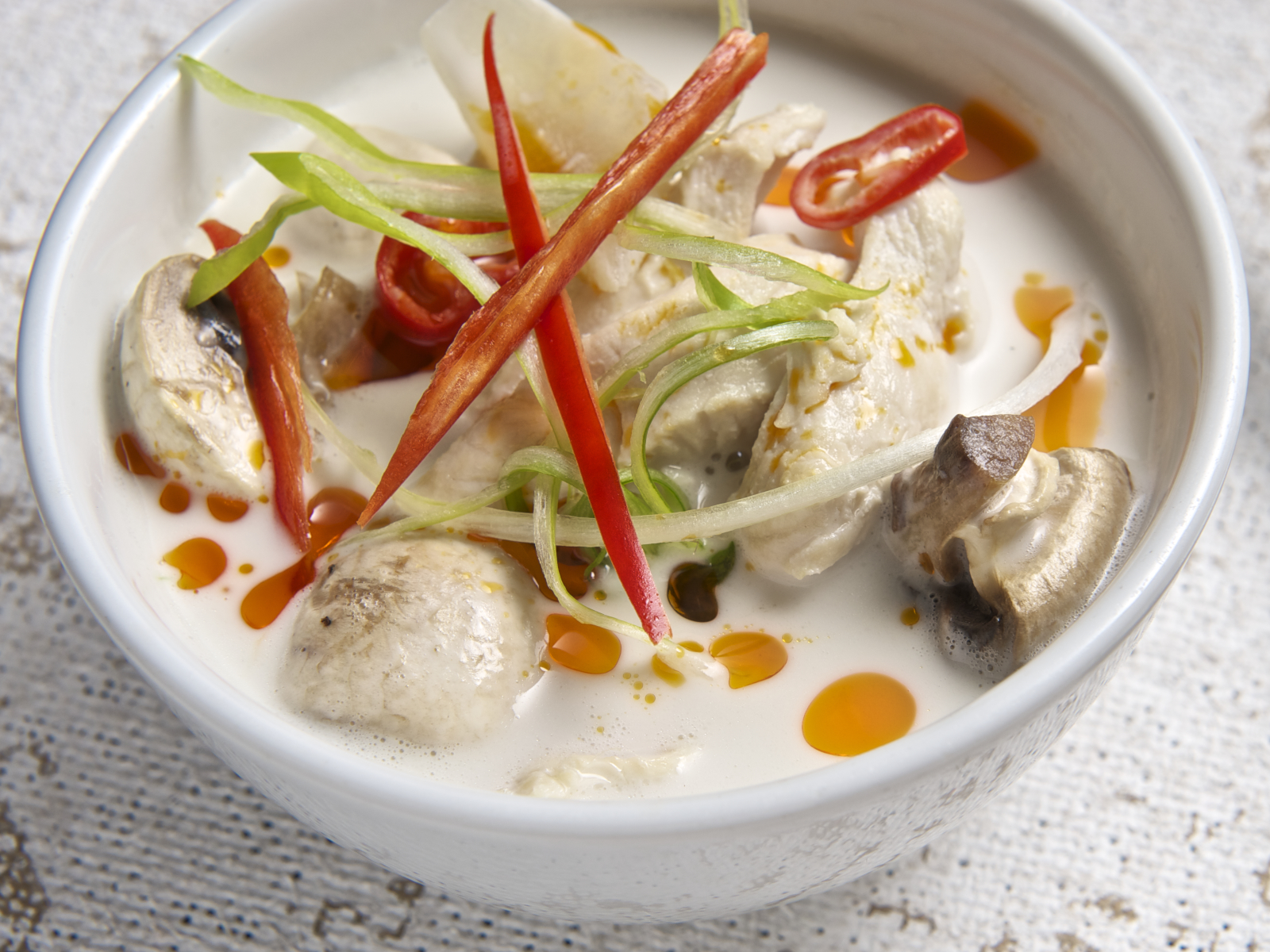
Tom kha kai

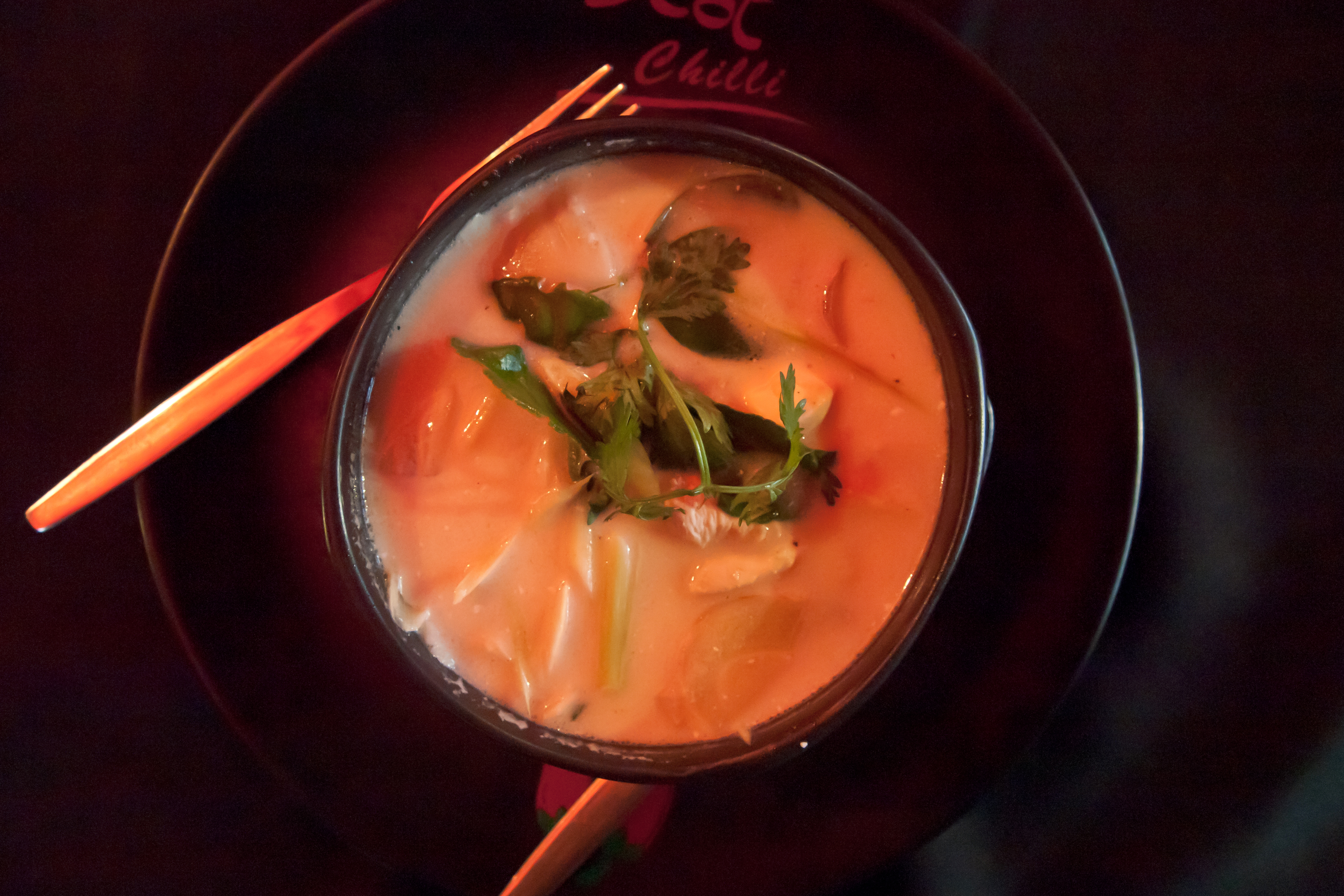
Tom kha, Thai coconut soup, Chiang Mai

== See also ==
- Tom yum
- Tom khlong
- List of soups
