= Tom khlong =

Thai soup

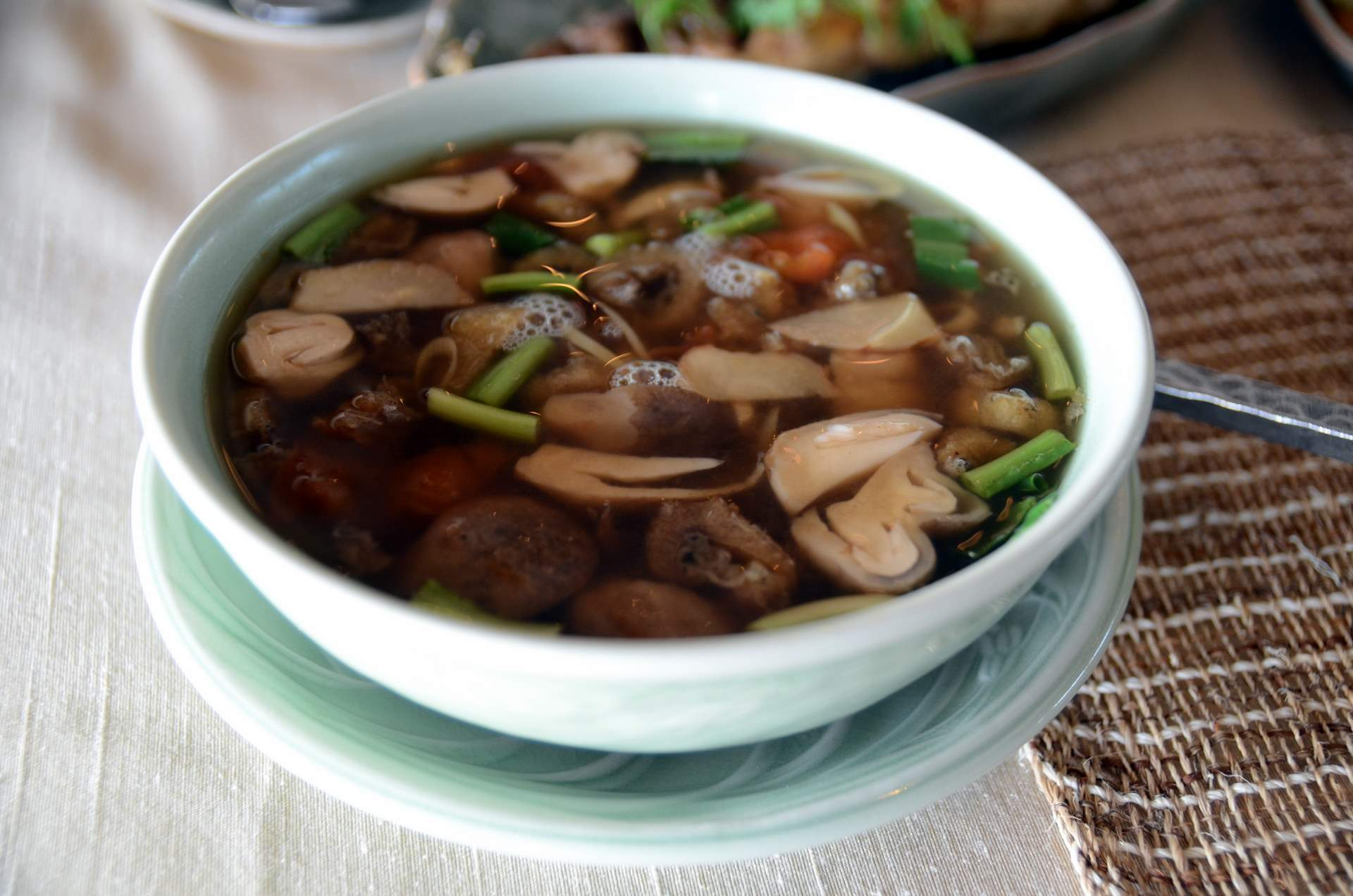
- Alternative names: Tom hok ue
- Type: soup
- Place of origin: Thailand
- Serving temperature: hot
- Main ingredients: Tamarind juice, galangal, lemon grass, kaffir lime leaves, Dry chilis and Dry fish

Tom khlong (Thai: ต้มโคล้ง, pronounced [tôm kʰlóːŋ]) is a sour and spicy soup with smoked dried fish and various herbs.

== Description ==
Tom khlong is a traditional Thai dish similar to tom yum except that it uses herbs which have been dried or roasted. There is an alternative name that ancient Thai people had for tom khlong, tom hok ue (Thai: ต้มโฮกอือ, pronounced [tôm hôːk ʔɯ̄ː]; hok ue is the sound that people make when they take a sip and the soup produces a refreshing feeling.

== Ingredients ==
There are various types of herbs in tom khlong depending on the recipe, but the most important ingredients are dried fish (sometimes fresh fish are used); galangal, which is used to deodorize the fishy smell; kaffir lime leaves, also used to deodorize the fishy smell; tamarind juice, lemongrass, shallot; and dry Thai chili peppers. Also, paprika can be added for extra spice. Other ingredients are also sometimes added to bring more flavour and texture, such as lime juice, tomatoes, basil and parsley.

== See also ==
- Tom kha
- Thai cuisine
- List of soups
- List of Thai dishes
