= Opor ayam =

Indonesian chicken coconut milk dish

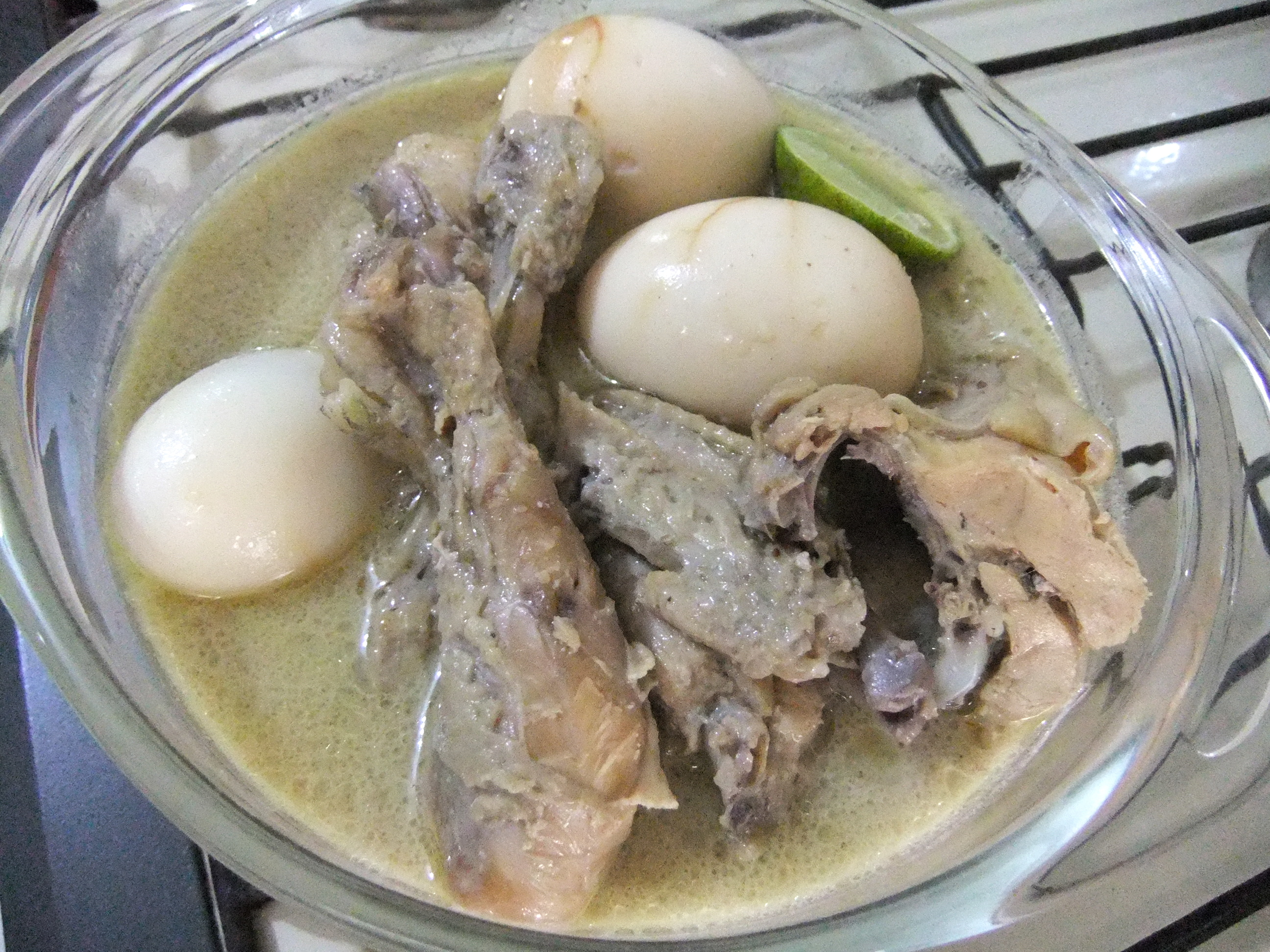
- Opor Ayam, braised chicken in coconut milk
- Place of origin: Indonesia
- Region or state: Central Java, Yogyakarta, and East Java
- Associated cuisine: Indonesia
- Main ingredients: Chicken and coconut milk

Opor ayam (Indonesian pronunciation: [ˌɔpɔr ˈ(ʔ)ajam]) is an Indonesian dish from Central Java consisting of chicken cooked in coconut milk. The spice mixture (bumbu) includes galangal, lemongrass, cinnamon, tamarind juice, palm sugar, coriander, cumin, candlenut, garlic, shallot, and pepper. Opor ayam is also a popular dish for lebaran or Eid ul-Fitr, usually eaten with ketupat, sambal goreng ati (beef liver in sambal), and sayur labu siam (chayote cooked in coconut milk).

Opor ayam is a well-known food in Indonesia. This cuisine has been widely known in other regions, almost all parts of Indonesia, for many years. Opor ayam is boiled chicken, which is given a thick condiment from coconut milk and is added with various spices such as lemongrass, galangal, candlenut, coriander and so on.

== Varieties ==
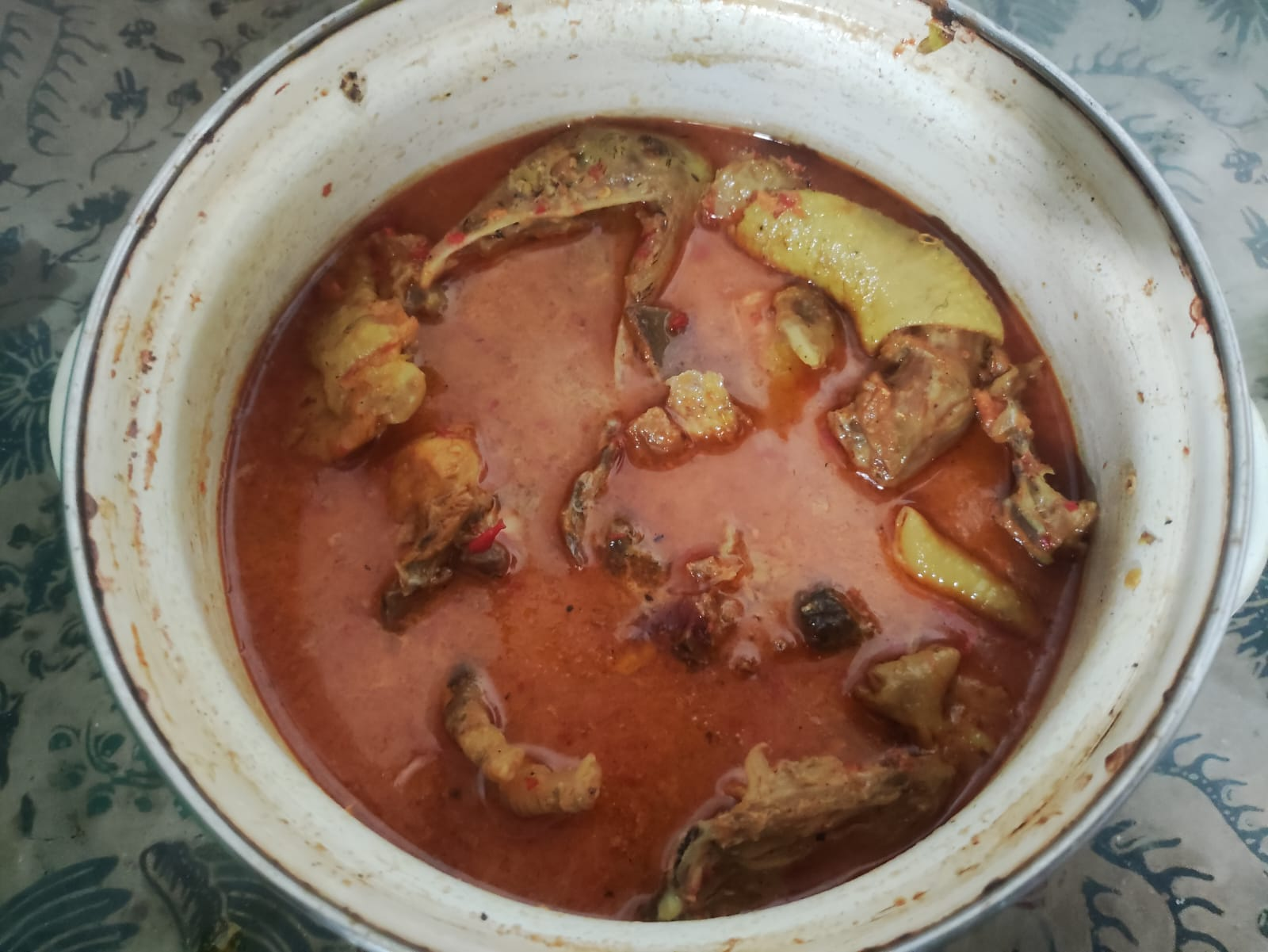
Opor ayam pedas from Bojonegoro

- Opor ayam bakar/panggang – an opor ayam in which the chicken is grilled or roasted before being cooked as opor and served on a banana leaf plate. It is a delicacy of Kudus Regency, Central Java.
- Opor ayam Betawi – Betawi-style opor ayam, the soup is not made from coconut milk but stir-fried grated coconut. It served with sambal hijau and lalapan.
- Opor ayam pedas – a spicy opor ayam usually uses ayam kampung (free-range chicken). It is a common dish in Cepu, Central Java and Bojonegoro, East Java.
- Opor ayam susu – opor ayam uses fresh milk instead of coconut milk.

== See also ==
- Opor
- List of chicken dishes
- List of Indonesian soups
