= Tom yum =

Thai soup

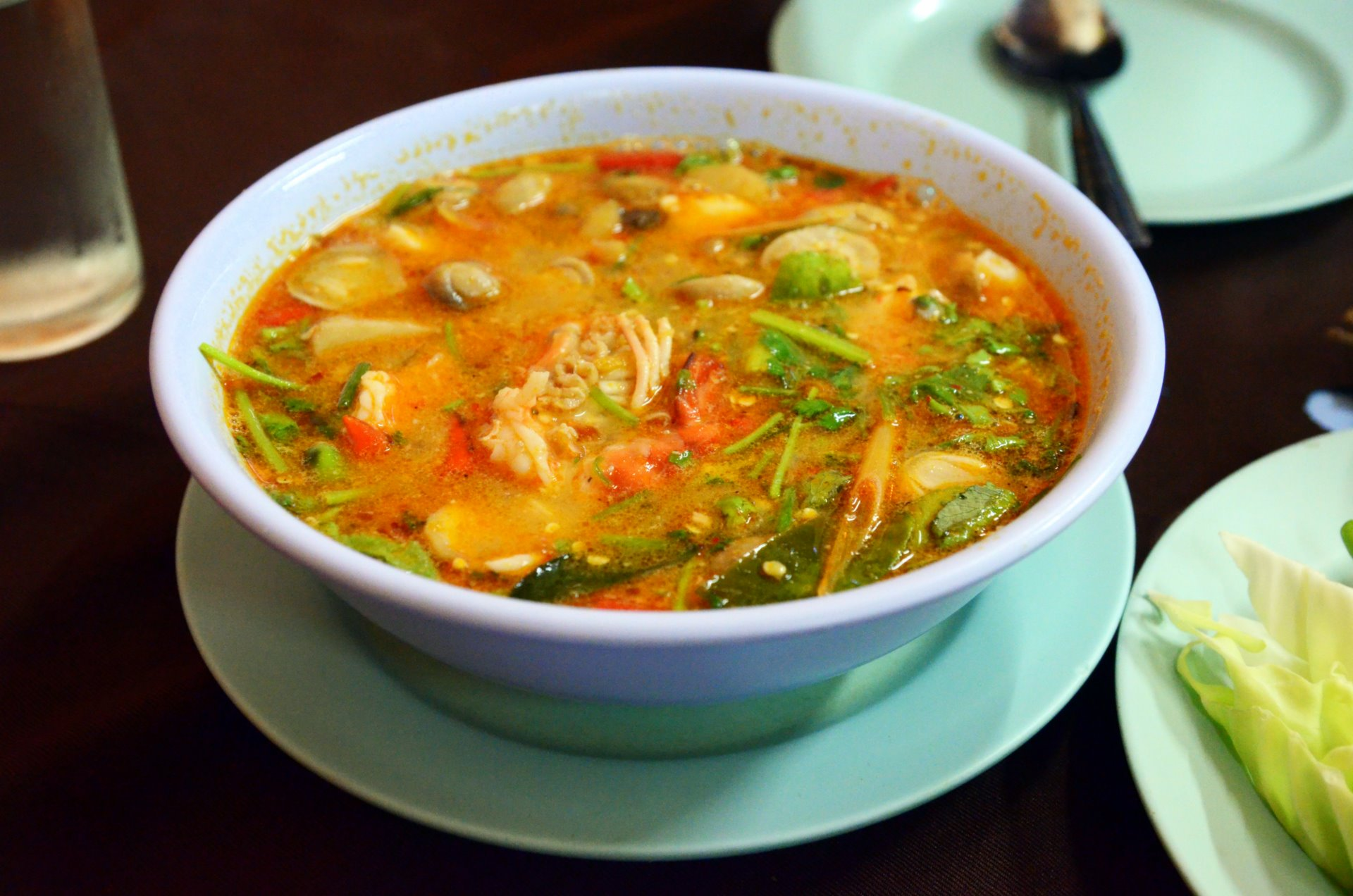
- Tom yum kung as served in Bangkok, Thailand
- Alternative names: Tom yam
- Type: Soup
- Course: Lunch
- Place of origin: Central Thailand
- Region or state: Southeast Asia
- Associated cuisine: Thailand
- Serving temperature: Hot
- Main ingredients: Broth, lemongrass, kaffir lime leaves, galangal, lime juice, fish sauce, chili peppers

Tom yum or tom yam (UK: /ˌtɒm ˈjæm, - ˈjʌm/, US: /- ˈjɑːm/; Thai: ต้มยำ, RTGS: tom yam [tôm jām]) is a family of hot and sour Thai soups. The name tom yam is composed of two words in the Thai language: tom refers to the boiling process, while yam means "mixed".

Historian Giles Milton contends that the origins of tom yum can be traced back to India, where there is a variation of hot and sour shrimp soup known as sour prawn soup. In Thailand, tom yam is available in various types, with the most popular being tom yam nam khon (creamy tom yam soup), and tom yam nam sai (clear tom yam soup). This soup features a variety of main ingredients, including shrimp, pork, chicken, and seafood.

== Preparation ==
The soup base depends on the exact sub-type but is generally water, coconut milk, or chicken or other broth.

Various aromatic ingredients are sliced, roughly pounded, and simmered to extract their flavor. These include fresh ingredients such as lemongrass, kaffir lime leaves, galangal, and chilis. For shrimp-based soups, shrimp shells and heads may also be simmered, to extract their flavor. These ingredients are often then removed as their flavor is now extracted and many are not edible. However they may be left in, as an aid to presentation.

Alternatively, commercial tom yum paste may be used. This is made by crushing all the herb ingredients and stir-frying them in oil, then adding seasoning and other preservative ingredients. The paste is bottled or packaged and sold around the world.

In modern popular versions the soup may also contain mushrooms—usually straw mushrooms or oyster mushrooms.

Various meats are added next, commonly fish, shrimp, mixed seafood, pork, or chicken.

When the meat is cooked, final flavorings whose taste is destroyed by heat, such as fish sauce and lime juice, are added. For most varieties a paste called nam phrik phao (Thai: น้ำพริกเผา) is also added, made from shrimp, chilis, shallots, and garlic. This imparts sweet, salty, and spicy tastes.

Yet other ingredients may also be used, depending on the exact variety of tom yam, such as evaporated milk.

The soup is often topped with a generous sprinkling of fresh chopped coriander leaves, and may be served over a serving of rice.

== Selected types ==
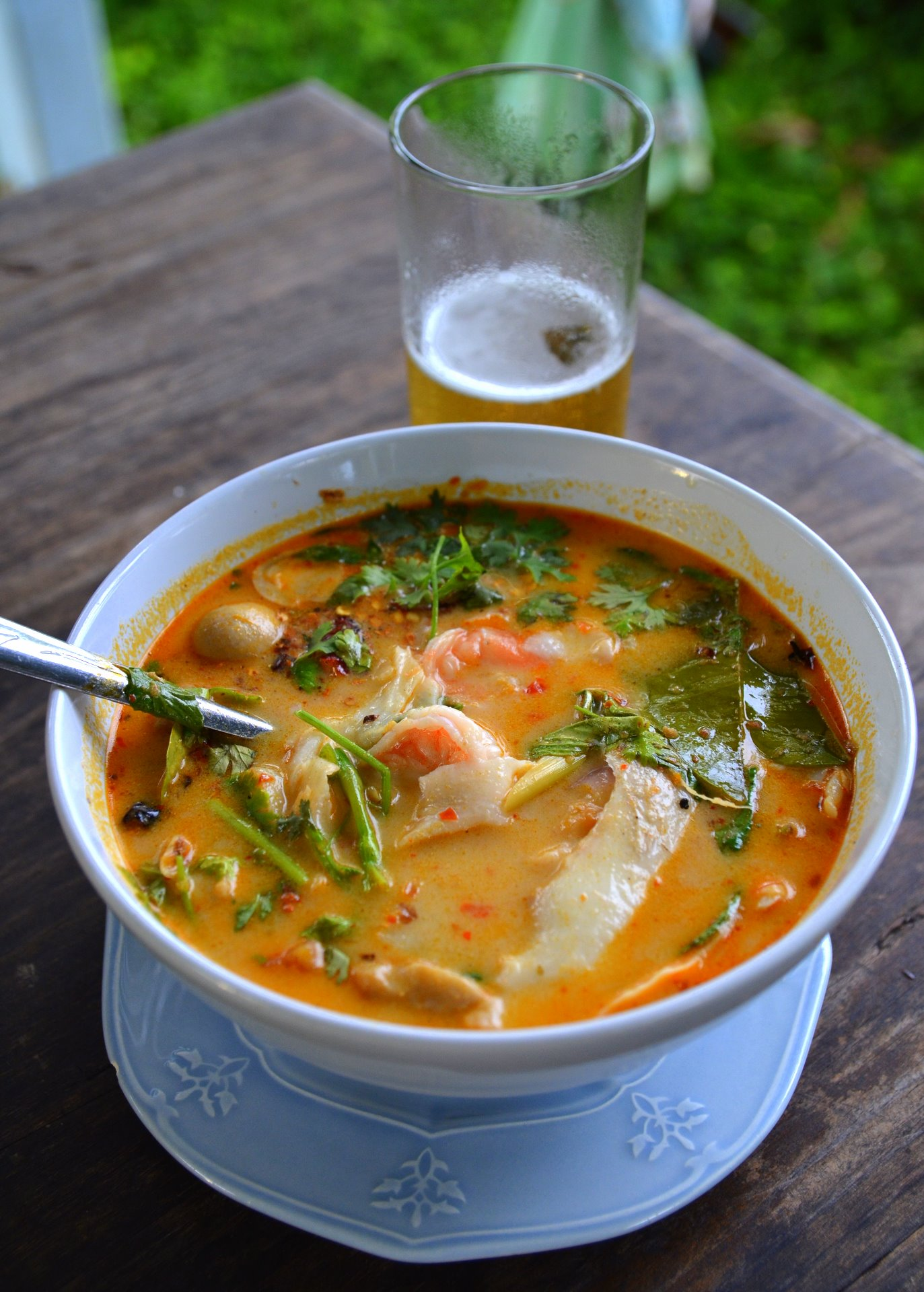
Tom yum kung maphrao on nam khon, as served in Uttaradit, Thailand

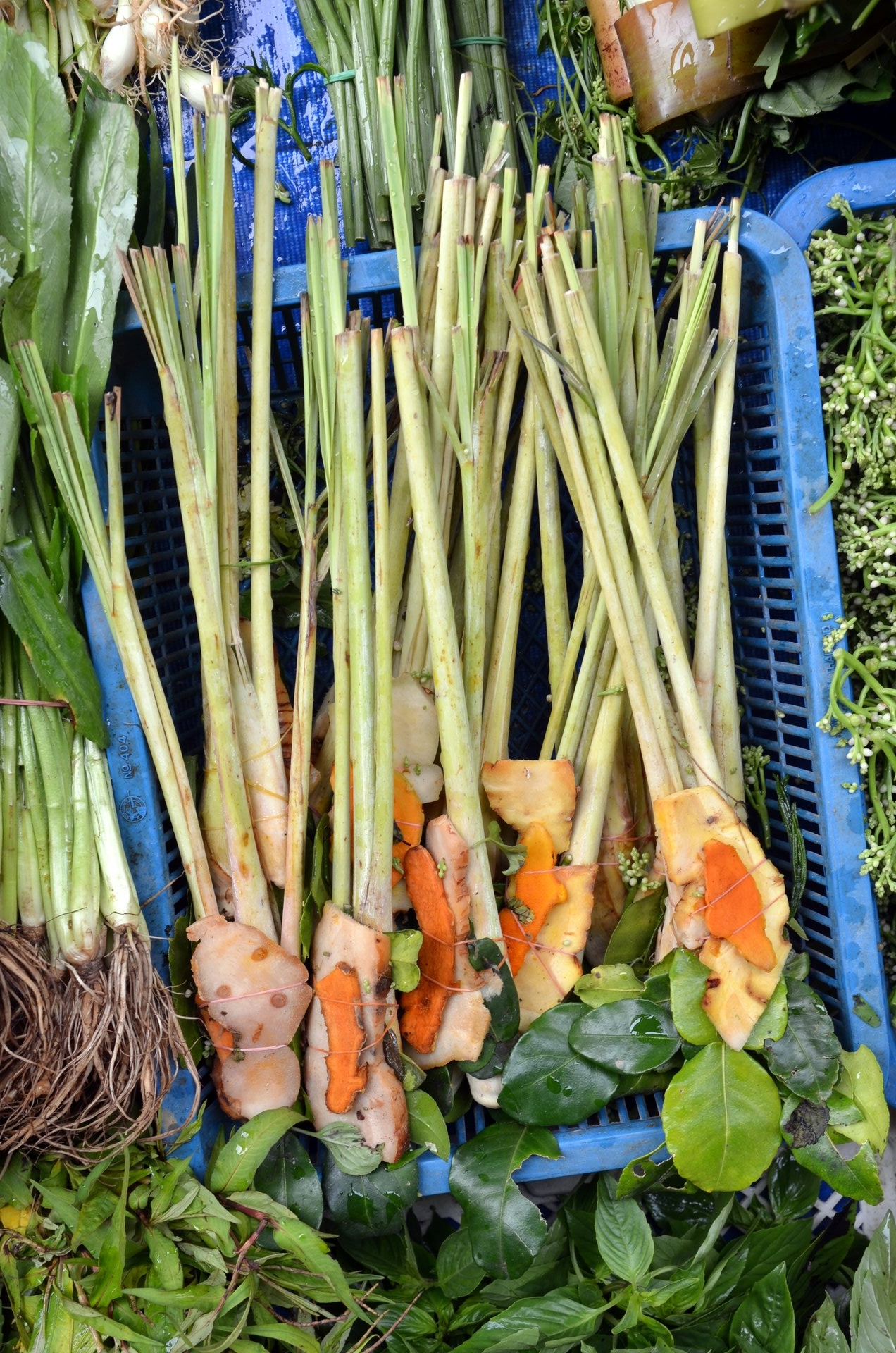
Ready-to-use bundles of lemongrass, galangal, lime leaves, and, for chicken tom yam, also turmeric, are sold at Thai markets.

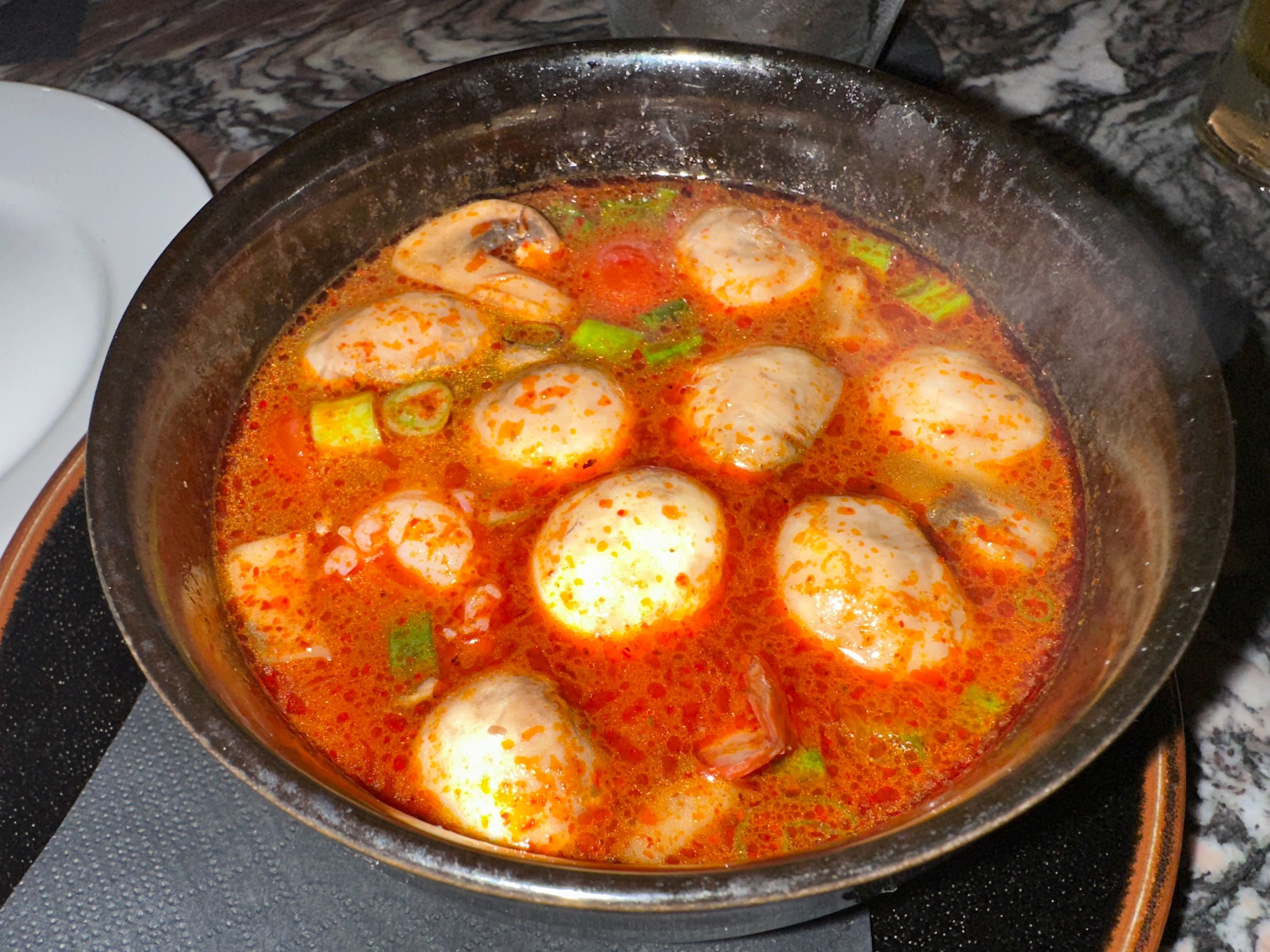
Shrimp tom yum soup from a Thai restaurant in Delray Beach, Florida

- Tom yam nam sai (Thai: ต้มยำน้ำใส), clear broth tom yam soup.
- Tom yam nam khon (Thai: ต้มยำน้ำข้น) is a more recent variation from the 1980s commonly with prawns as a main ingredient. Evaporated milk or non-dairy creamer powder is added to the broth as a finishing touch.
- Tom yam kathi (Thai: ต้มยำกะทิ) — coconut milk-based tom yum — is often confused with tom kha kai ("chicken galanga soup"), where galangal is the dominant flavour of the coconut milk-based soup.
- Tom yum kung (Thai: ต้มยำกุ้ง) — the version of the dish most popular among tourists — is made with prawns as the main ingredient. The dish originated during the Rattanakosin Kingdom.
- Tom yam pla (Thai: ต้มยำปลา) is a clear fish soup that was traditionally eaten with rice. It used to be the most widespread form of tom yam before mass-tourism came to Thailand, for fresh fish is readily available almost everywhere in the region's rivers, canals and lakes as well as in the sea. Usually fish with firm flesh that doesn't crumble after boiling is preferred for this type of soup.
- Tom yam gai (Thai: ต้มยำไก่) is the chicken version of the soup.
- Tom yam po taek (Thai: ต้มยำโป๊ะแตก) or tom yam thale (Thai: ต้มยำทะเล) is a variant of the soup with mixed seafood, like prawns, squid, clams and pieces of fish.
- Tom yam kung maphrao on nam khon (Thai: ต้มยำมะพร้าวอ่อนน้ำข้น) is a version of prawn tom yum with the meat of a young coconut and a dash of (coconut) milk.
- Tom yam kha mu (Thai: ต้มยำขาหมู), made with pork leg. These require a long cooking time under low fire.
- Tom yam sikhrong kraduk on (Thai: ต้มยำซี่โครงกระดูกอ่อน), made with pork ribs. The hot and spicy broth complements other Thai dishes well. In restaurants in Thailand, tom yum comes in a fire pot with hot flame flaring from the chimney in the middle.

== Other spicy and sour soups ==
Less well known outside Thailand is tom khlong (ต้มโคล้ง), a spicy sour soup where the sourness does not derive from lime juice but through the use of tamarind. Tom som (Thai: ต้มส้ม) are soups that are also very similar to tom yum but most often do not contain lemongrass or kaffir lime leaves. Depending on the type of tom som, the acidity can be derived from lime juice or from the use of tamarind. Another well-known and popular dish is tom saeb (ต้มแซ่บ), a spicy and sour soup originating from northeastern Thailand (Isan). It is typically made with pork bones or beef as the main ingredients. Tom saeb is characterized by its bold flavors and fragrant aroma, derived from herbs such as galangal, lemongrass, and kaffir lime leaves, along with seasonings like lime juice, chili, and fish sauce.

== Outside Thailand ==
=== Malaysia ===
Tom yum, locally spelled as tomyam, is very well-received among Malaysians, especially for dinner, since its introduction around the 1980s. The cuisine is now considered a must-have on most restaurant menus in Malaysia, especially the peninsular states. As of 2018, the popularity of tom yum and other Thai dishes had brought employment to at least 120,000 south Thai cooks, working restaurants mainly in Selangor state and the capital city of Kuala Lumpur, and owning 5000 to 6000 Thai restaurants throughout the country.

== See also ==
- Tom kha
- Thai cuisine
- Malay cuisine
- List of soups
- List of Thai ingredients
- Three grand soups
