= Opor =

Indonesian coconut milk dish

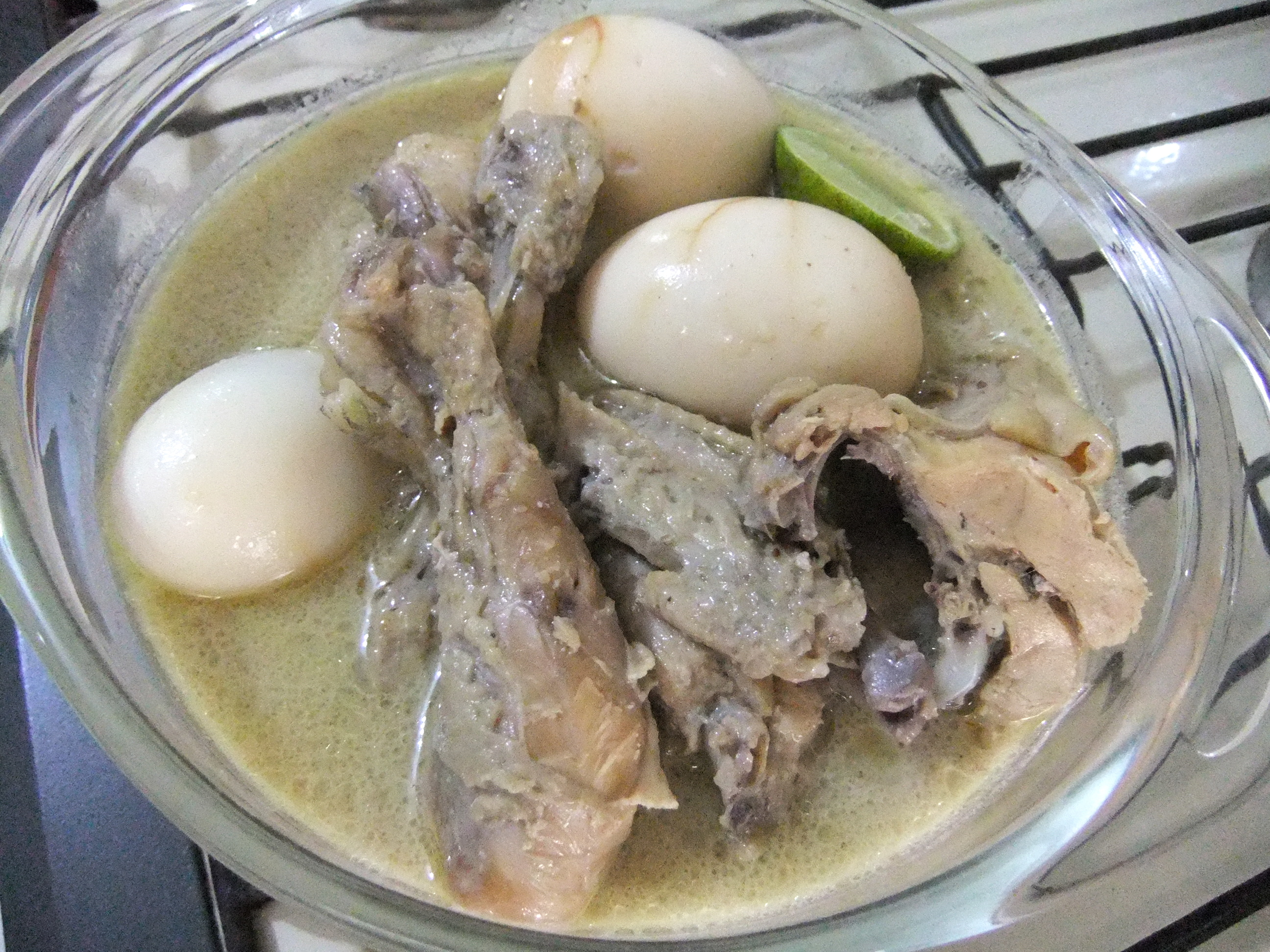
- Opor ayam telur, braised chicken and eggs in coconut milk, the most common type of opor
- Place of origin: Indonesia
- Region or state: Maritime Southeast Asia
- Associated cuisine: Indonesia
- Main ingredients: Various ingredients cooked in coconut milk and spices

Opor is a type of dish cooked and braised in coconut milk from Indonesia, especially from Central Java. In Indonesia the term 'opor' refers to the method of cooking in coconut milk. Opor is a popular dish for lebaran or Eid ul-Fitr, usually eaten with ketupat and sambal goreng ati (beef liver in sambal). In Yogyakarta chicken or egg opor is often eaten with gudeg and rice.

== Ingredients ==
The main ingredient is meat (most commonly chicken or beef) and/or eggs cooked in coconut milk with a mixture of spices consisting of palm sugar, lemongrass, lemon leaf, ground garlic, shallot, candlenut, black pepper, galangal, coriander, and cooking oil. The meat is braised on a small flame until it's cooked and the coconut milk has thickened. Opor has a grey-whitish color and a thin soupy consistency. Similar dishes to opor include sayur lodeh, gulai and kari, as they all use coconut milk as a base. Compared to other traditional Indonesian dishes, opor uses less spices, and the absence of turmeric and chilli pepper make opor maintain its whitish coconut milk-like color.

== Variants ==
The most common opor is opor ayam (chicken opor), although other ingredients are also can be cooked as opor. Opor daging (beef), opor bebek (duck), opor telur (hard boiled chicken egg), and opor tahu (tofu) are examples of opor variants. There is another variant of opor which uses milk instead of coconut milk called opor susu.

== See also ==
- Opor ayam – Indonesian chicken coconut milk dish
- Gulai – Southeast Asian dish
- Aji de gallina – Peruvian chicken stew
- Indonesian cuisine
