= Tamarind juice =

Juice made from tamarind

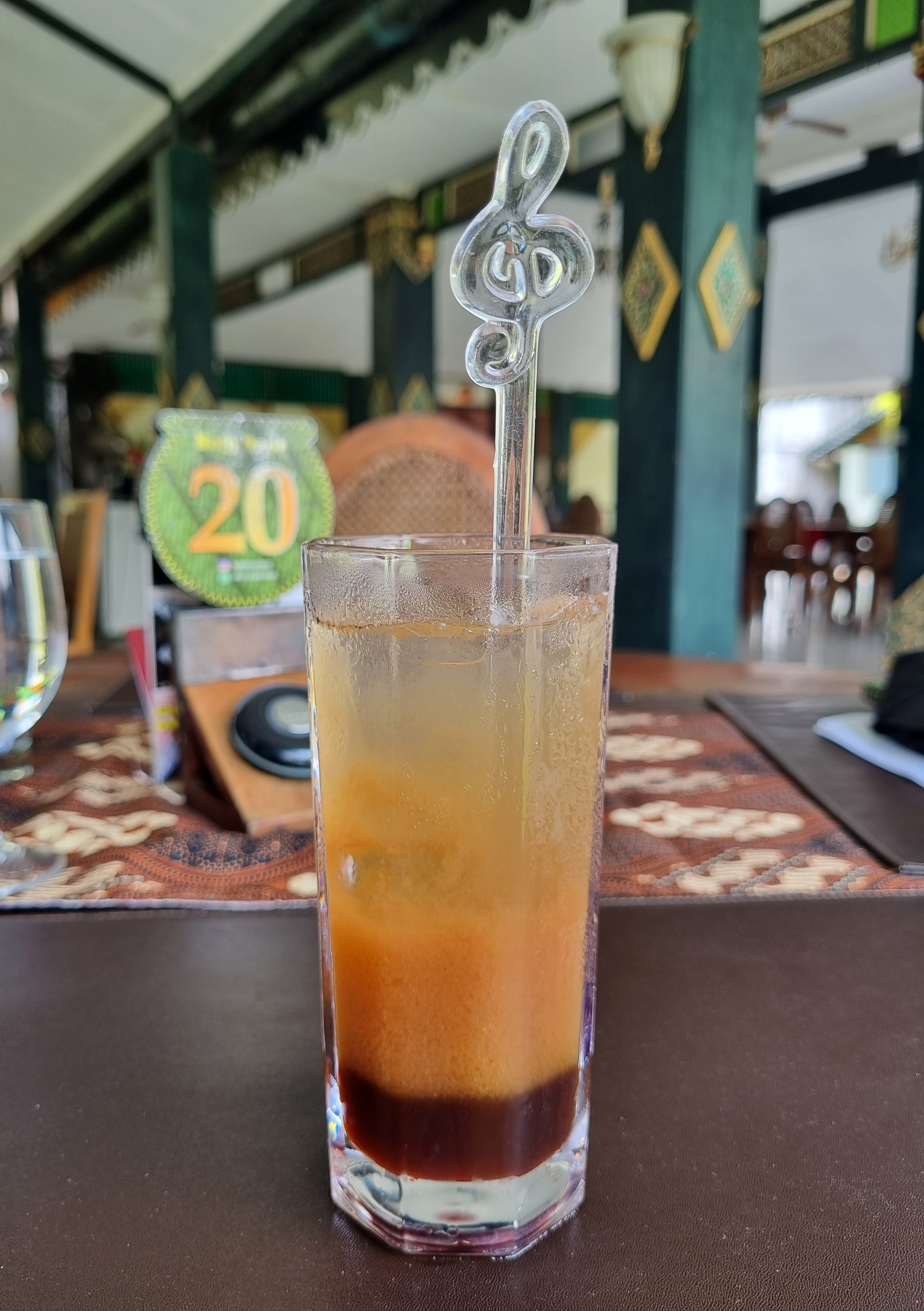
Es asem jawa or Javanese tamarind juice with liquid palm sugar and ice, served in Yogyakarta, Indonesia

Tamarind juice (also known as tamarind water) is a drink or ingredient made by extracting the sweet-sour pulp of tamarind (Tamarindus indica) into water. The tamarind tree is native to tropical Africa and has long been cultivated across tropical and subtropical regions, where its pulp is widely used in beverages as well as foods. Tamarind juice can be consumed as a beverage appreciated for its fresh sour taste, or used for culinary purposes as a sour flavouring agent. In addition to traditional uses, tamarind is used in some modern cocktails and non-alcoholic mixed drinks for its tart flavour.

== As beverage ==
The juice of tamarind fruit is produced by squeezing and mixing the pulp of tamarind fruit with water. Sometimes the process also include the boiling of tamarind pulp to further extracting the tamarind fruit essence.

Then the mixed liquid is sieved to separate the juice from tamarind seeds, fibers and bits of fruit shell. The sour-tasting tamarind juice is often sweetened with the addition of liquid palm sugar and often served with ice.In several regions, tamarind juice is prepared ad consumed as a traditional beverage. In Indonesia, tamarind juice is called air asem (tamarind water), es asem (tamarind ice) or gula asem (sugared tamarind). It is a popular traditional drink in Java, where it is commonly mixed with gula jawa or gula aren (palm sugar). It is also often served as fresh and sour palate cleansing drink after consuming the often bitter-tasting Javanese jamu herbal drinks. Tamarind is also used as an ingredient in Indonesian drinks in broader traditions beyond plain juice, including the jamu herbal drink.

Tamarind juice and tamarind-based drinks are also produced commercially and available in many countries.

In Indonesia, tamarind juice is also produced industrially as UHT packed drink marketed as healthy drink sari asem asli or real tamarind juice. There are also commercially mass-produced canned and bottled tamarind juice, offered especially in Asian supermarket.

=== Middle east ===
Comparable beverages also appear in other culinary traditions. In Turkish cuisine, tamarind juice is known as demirhindi şerbeti which is tamarind made into sharbat beverage.

=== Africa ===
In northern Cameroon, tamarind juice is known as the “djabbe” beverage in local usage. Field research described djabbe as among the most popular cooling drinks consumed in northern Cameroon.

=== Americas ===
In Mexico and other Latin American countries, tamarind juice is known as agua de tamarindo or "tamarind water". It is one of the most common agua fresca variant in Mexico.

== Culinary use ==
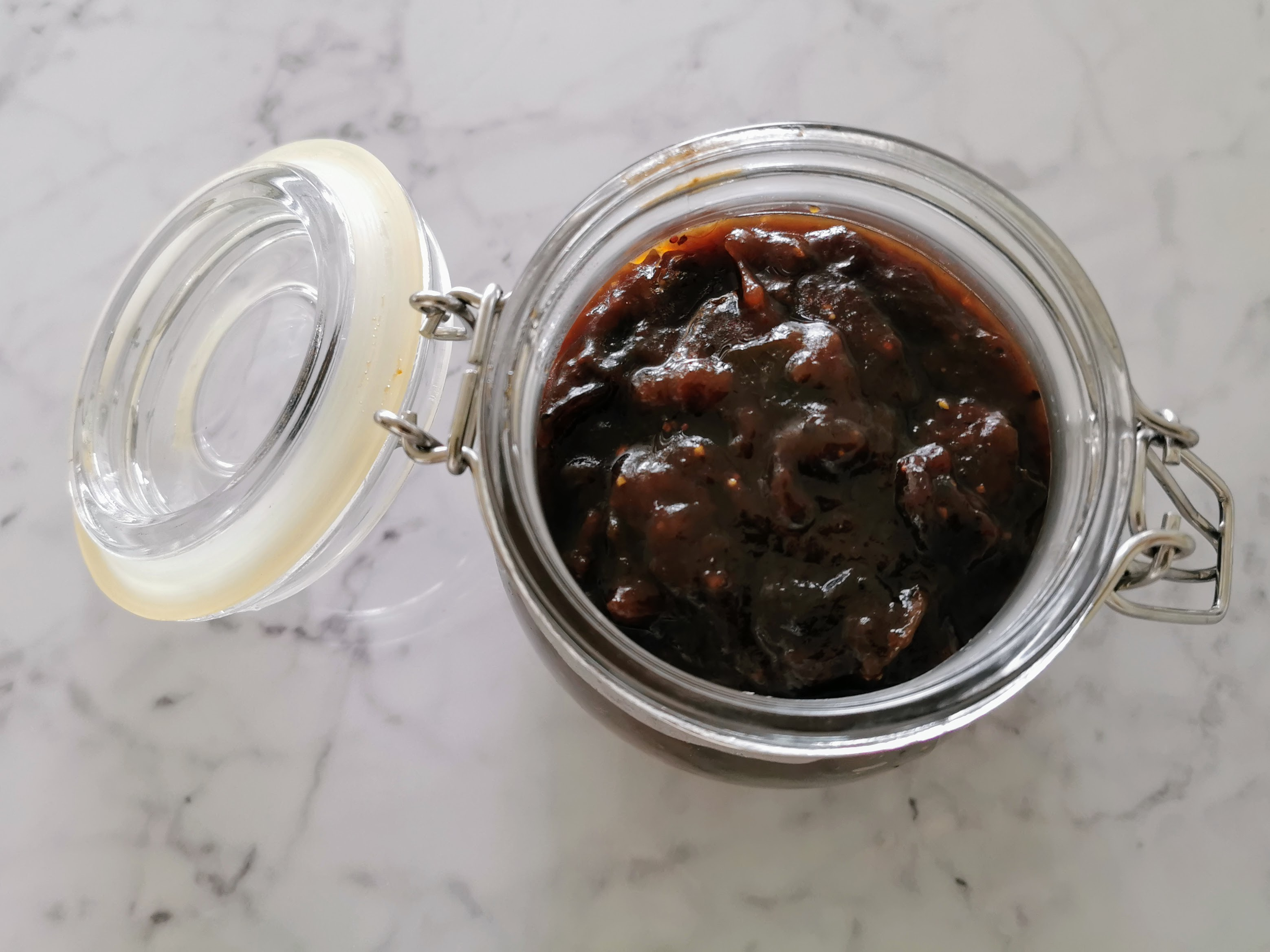
Puliynichi, tamarind paste used in Southern Indian cuisine

The juice of tamarind fruit pulp is often used as sour flavouring agent akin to vinegar in several Asian culinary traditions; e.g. Indonesian, Thai and Indian cuisine. In Indonesian cuisine, tamarind juice is an essential ingredients as a mixture in peanut sauce for gado-gado and pecel salad. It is also essential flavouring agent in asam pedas and pindang fish stew and sayur asem vegetable in tamarind soup.

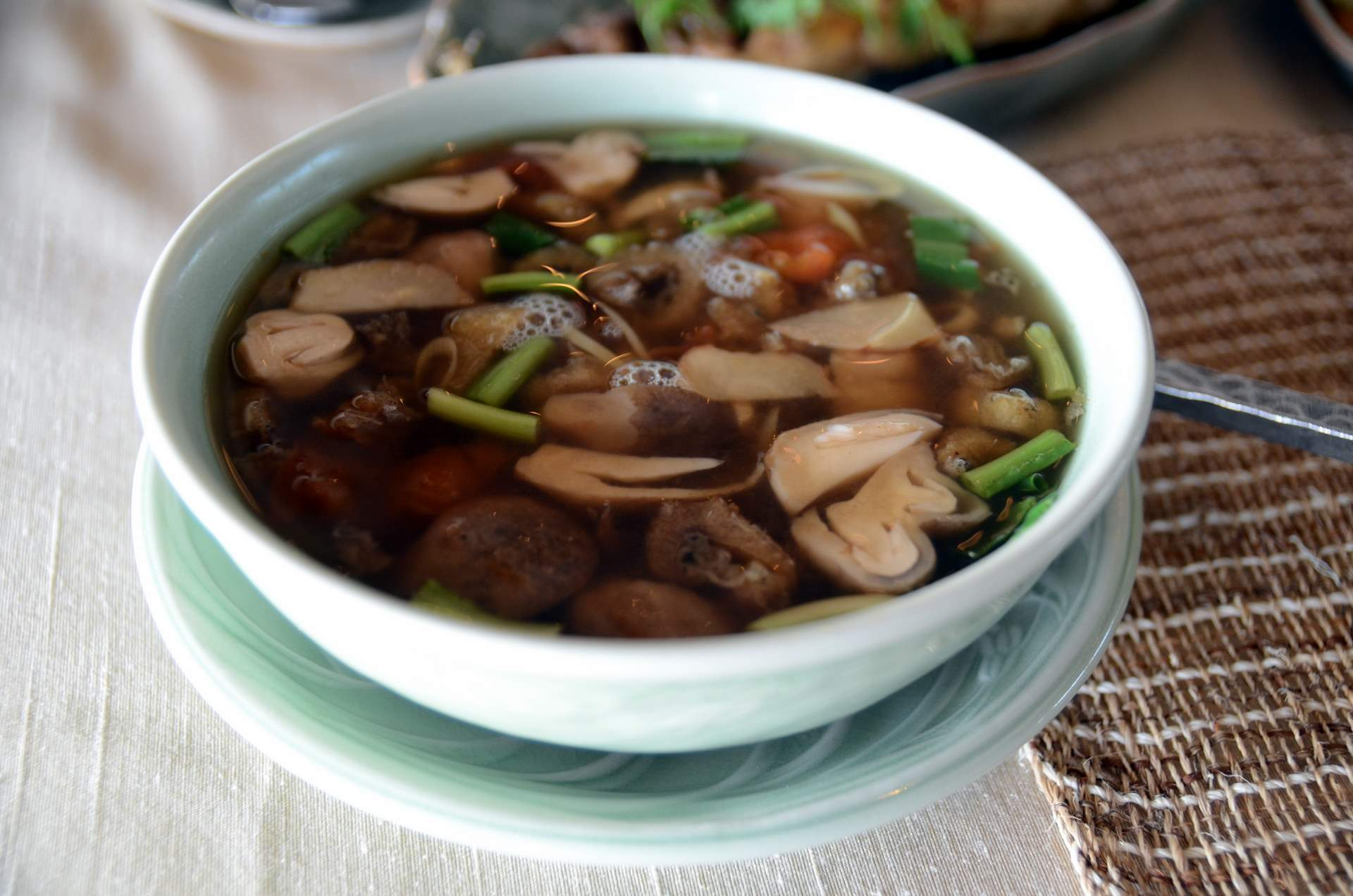
Tom khlong (Thai script: ต้มโคล้ง), a Thai spicy sour soup that uses tamarind juice

In the flavour of Thai cuisine, the distinctive sourness does not derive from vinegar or lime juice, but through the use of tamarind juice. It is used as a sour flavouring ingredient in pad thai rice noodle, tom khlong spicy sour soup and kaeng som kung sour fish curry.

In Indian cuisine, tamarind juice is often made into pulp, mixed with jaggery and used as flavouring agent for side dishes or condiment.

== See also ==
- Tamarindo
