= Galangal =

Member of the ginger family

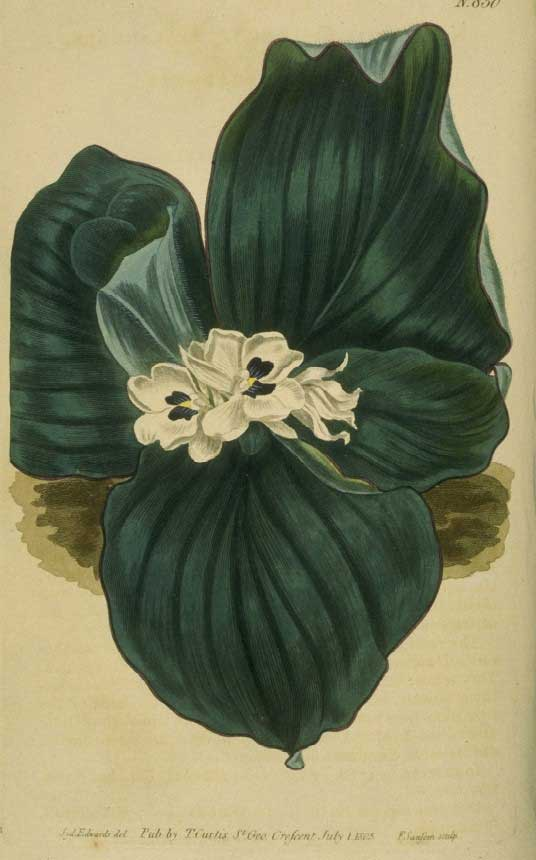
Kaempferia galanga

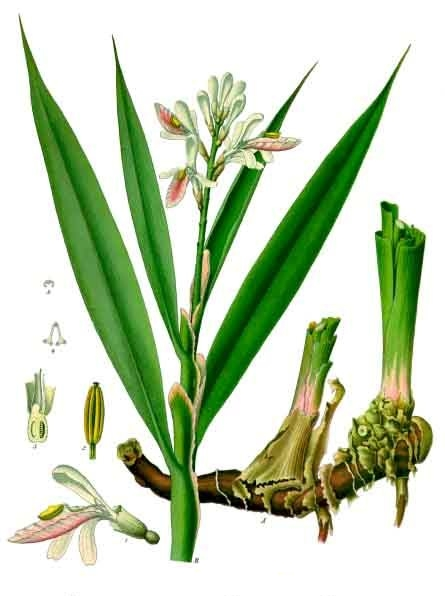
Lesser galangal (Alpinia officinarum)

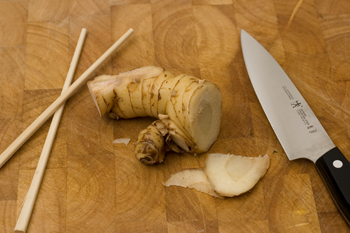
Galangal rhizome ready to be prepared for cooking

Galangal (/ˈɡæləŋɡæl/) is a rhizome of plants in the ginger family Zingiberaceae, with culinary and medicinal uses originating in Indonesia. It can be any of the four species listed below, and is known for its pungent, aromatic flavor.

Greater galangal (Alpinia galanga) is most commonly used, and is similar to ginger and turmeric. It is native to South Asia and Southeast Asia. Lesser galangal (Alpinia officinarum) and other types are also used, though less frequently. In traditional medicine, galangal is used to treat various ailments. It is a common ingredient in Cambodia (Khmer), Indonesian, Lao, Malaysian, Thai and Vietnamese cuisine, and is also used in some traditional Chinese medicine.

== Differentiation ==
The word galangal, or its variant galanga or archaically galingale, can refer in common usage to the aromatic rhizome of any of four plant species in the Zingiberaceae (ginger) family, namely:

- Alpinia galanga, also called greater galangal, lengkuas, Siamese ginger or laos
- Alpinia officinarum, or lesser galangal
- Boesenbergia rotunda, also called Chinese ginger or fingerroot
- Kaempferia galanga, also called kencur, black galangal or sand ginger

The term galingale is sometimes also used for the rhizome of an unrelated sweet cyperus (Cyperus longus), traditionally used as a folk medicine in Europe.

== Uses ==
=== Culinary ===
Various galangal rhizomes are used in traditional Southeast Asian cuisine, such as Khmer kroeung (Cambodian paste), Thai and Lao tom yum and tom kha gai soups, Vietnamese Huế cuisine (tré) and throughout Indonesian cuisine, as in soto and opor. Polish Żołądkowa Gorzka vodka is flavoured with galangal.

While all species of galangal are closely related to common ginger, each is unique in its own right. Due to their unique taste and 'hotness' profiles, the individual varieties are usually distinguished from ginger, and from each other, in traditional Asian dishes. The taste of galangal has been described as "flowery", "like ginger with cardamom" and "like peppery cinnamon". Lesser galangal was popular in European medieval cooking.

=== Medical ===
In ethnobotany, galangal has been used for its purported merits in promoting digestion and alleviating respiratory diseases and stomach problems. Specific medical virtues have been attributed to each galangal variety.

German medieval abbess and polymath, Hildegard of Bingen, used greater galangal to prevent various ailments including heart attacks and angina.
