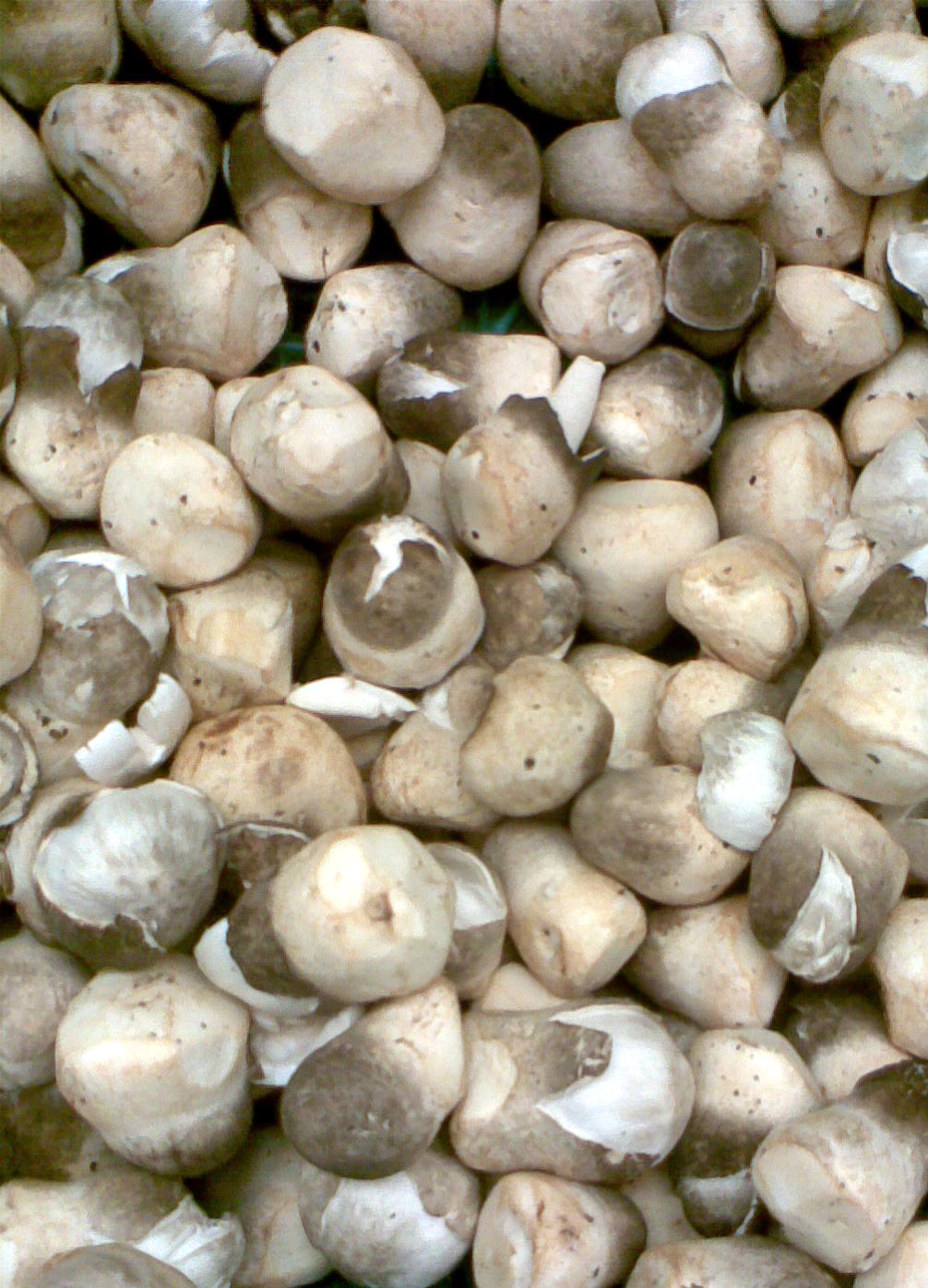
- Straw mushrooms, some still veiled, others opened—showing the cap inside

Scientific classification
- Kingdom: Fungi
- Division: Basidiomycota
- Class: Agaricomycetes
- Order: Agaricales
- Family: Pluteaceae
- Genus: Volvariella
- Species: V. volvacea

Binomial name
- Volvariella volvacea (Bul.) Singer (1951)

Synonyms
- Agaricus volvaceus Bull. (1786); Amanita virgata Pers. (1797); Vaginata virgata Gray (1821); Volvaria volvacea P. Kumm. (1871)

= Volvariella volvacea =

Volvariella volvacea
- Mycological characteristics
- Gills on hymenium
- Cap is conical or umbonate
- Hymenium is free
- Stipe has a volva
- Spore print is salmon
- Ecology is saprotrophic
- Edibility is choice

Volvariella volvacea (also known as paddy straw mushroom or straw mushroom) is a species of edible mushroom cultivated throughout East and Southeast Asia and used extensively in Asian cuisine. They are often available fresh in regions where they are cultivated, but elsewhere are more frequently found canned or dried. Worldwide, straw mushrooms are the third-most-consumed mushroom.

== Description ==
In their button stage, straw mushrooms resemble poisonous death caps, but can be distinguished by several mycological features, including their pink spore print (spore prints of death caps are white). The two mushrooms have different distributions, with the death cap generally not found where the straw mushroom grows natively, but immigrants, particularly those from Southeast Asia to California and Australia, have been poisoned due to misidentification.

== Uses ==
Straw mushrooms are grown on rice straw beds and are most commonly picked when immature (often labelled "unpeeled"), during their button or egg phase, and before the veil ruptures. They are adaptable, taking four to five days to mature, and are most successfully grown in subtropical climates with high annual rainfall. No record has been found of their cultivation before the 19th century.

=== Broth ===
In the finishing and aging process of making dark soy sauce, the broth of straw mushrooms can be mixed into the soy sauce, which is then exposed to the sun to make mushroom dark soy sauce (草菇老抽 cǎogū lǎochōu). The added broth gives this soy sauce a richer flavor than plain dark soy sauce.

=== Nutrition ===
One cup (182 grams or 6.4 ounces) of straw mushrooms is nutritionally dense and provides 240 kilojoules (58 kilocalories) of food energy, 27.7 μg selenium (50.36% of RDA), 699 mg sodium (46.60%), 2.6 mg iron (32.50%), 0.242 mg copper (26.89%), 69 μg vitamin B_{9} (folate) (17.25%), 111 mg phosphorus (15.86%), 0.75 mg vitamin B_{5} (pantothenic acid) (15.00%), 6.97 g protein (13.94%), 4.5 g total dietary fiber (11.84%), and 1.22 mg zinc (11.09%).
