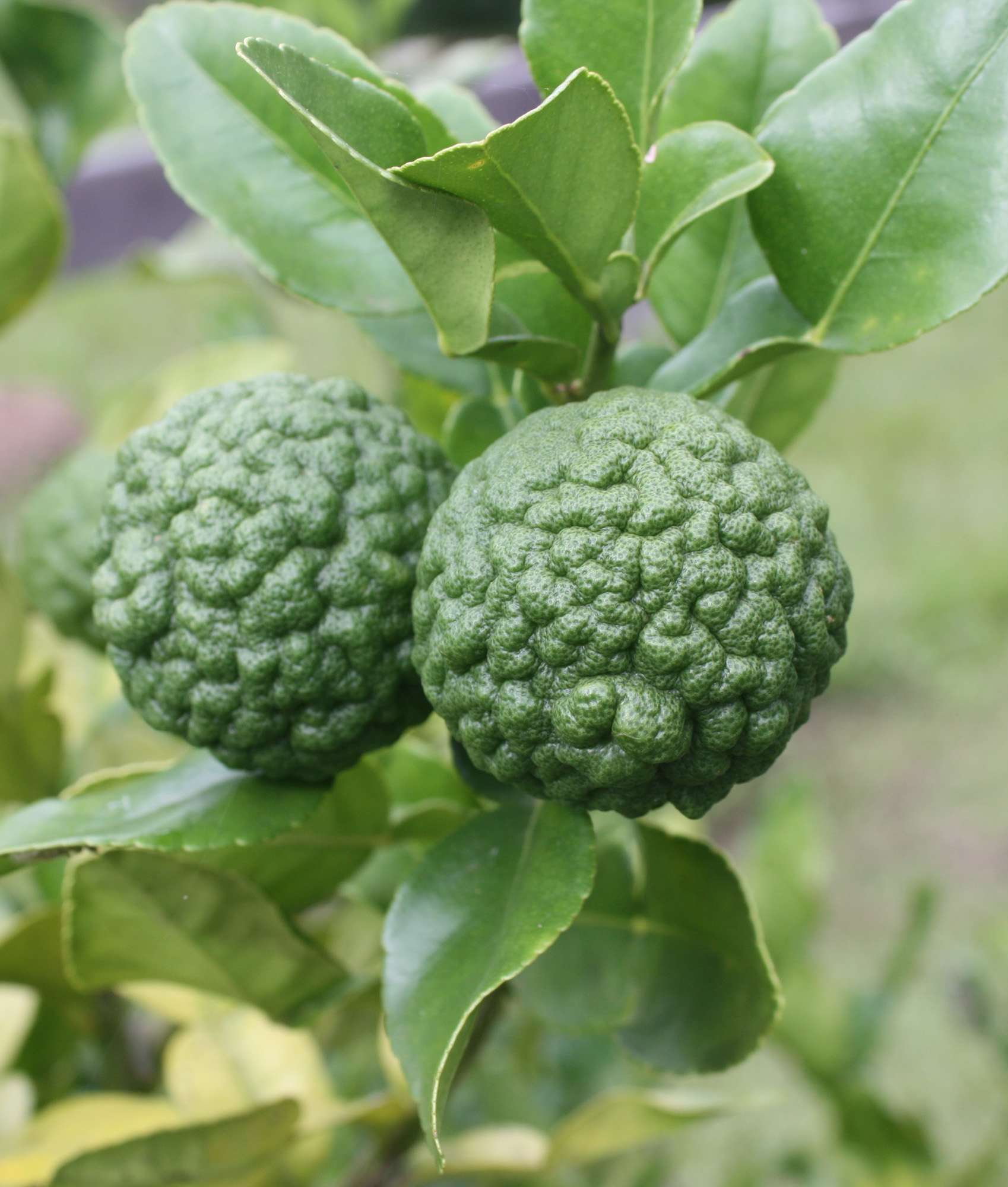
- Fruit on tree

Conservation status
- Least Concern (IUCN 3.1)

Scientific classification
- Kingdom: Plantae
- Clade: Tracheophytes
- Clade: Angiosperms
- Clade: Eudicots
- Clade: Rosids
- Order: Sapindales
- Family: Rutaceae
- Genus: Citrus
- Species: C. hystrix

Binomial name
- Citrus hystrix DC.
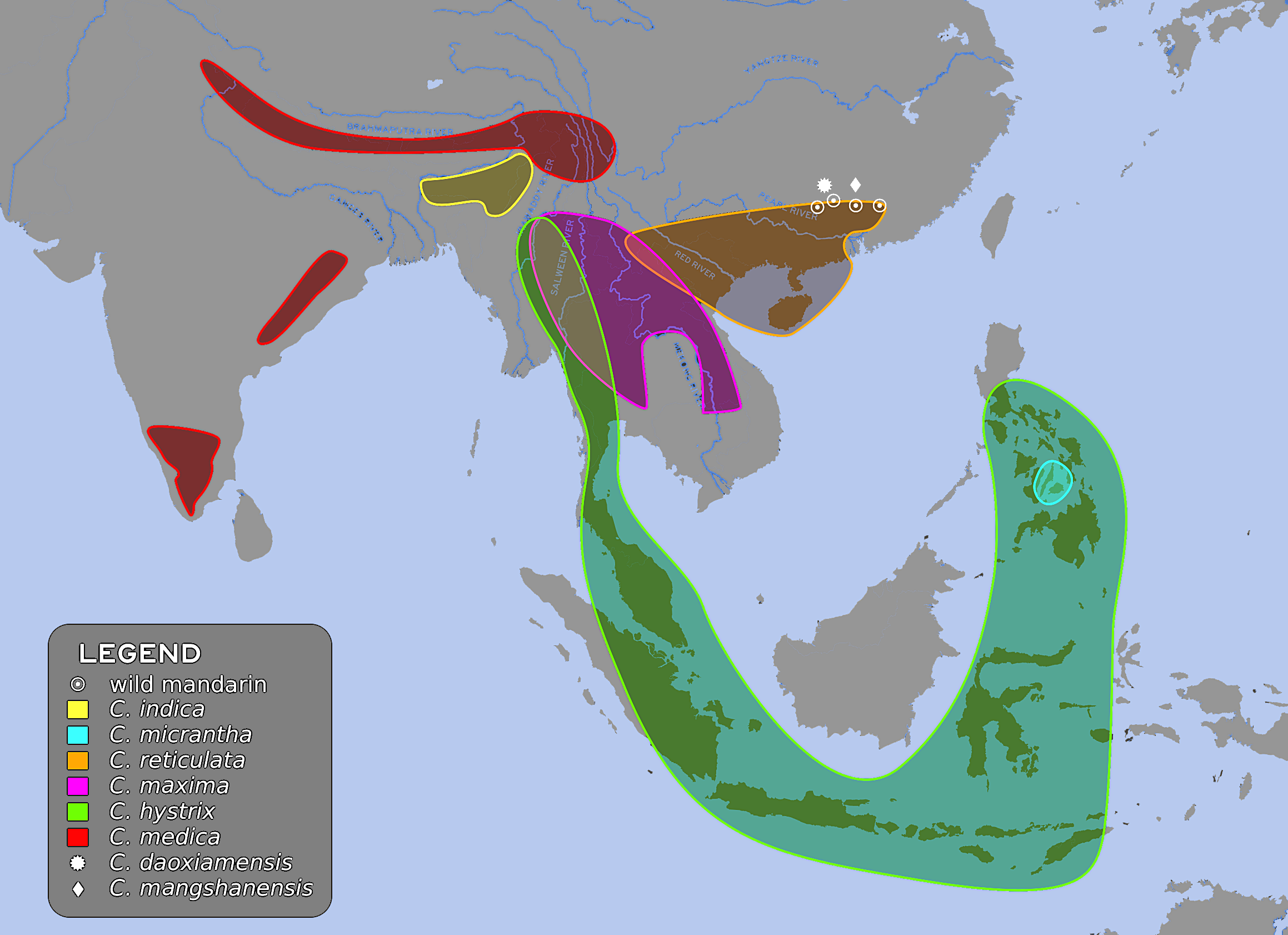
- Map of inferred original wild ranges of the main Citrus cultivars, with C. hystrix in pale green

Synonyms
- Synonymy: Citrus × aurantium hystrix (DC.) Jacquemont-Bonnefont; Citrus × aurantium var. saponacea Saff.; Citrus auraria Michel; Citrus balincolong (Yu.Tanaka) Yu.Tanaka; Citrus × bergamia var. unguentaria M.Roem.; Citrus × bergamia var. ventricosa (Michel) M.Roem.; Citrus boholensis (Wester) Yu.Tanaka; Citrus celebica Koord.; Citrus celebica var. southwickii (Wester) Swingle; Citrus combara Raf.; Citrus combara var. boholensis (Wester) Tanaka; Citrus combara var. macroptera (Montrouz.) Tanaka; Citrus combara var. micrantha (Wester) Tanaka; Citrus echinata St.-Lag., nom. illeg.; Citrus hyalopulpa Yu.Tanaka; Citrus hystrix var. annamensis (Yu.Tanaka) Guillaumin; Citrus hystrix var. balincolong Tanaka; Citrus hystrix var. boholensis Wester; Citrus hystrix var. micrantha (Wester) Merr.; Citrus hystrix var. microcarpa (Wester) Merr.; Citrus hystrix var. southwickii (Wester) Merr.; Citrus hystrix var. torosa (Blanco) Wester; Citrus kerrii (Swingle) Yu.Tanaka; Citrus latipes Hook.f. & Thomson; Citrus macroptera Montrouz.; Citrus macroptera var. annamensis Tanaka; Citrus macroptera var. boholensis (Wester) Tanaka; Citrus macroptera var. combara (Raf.) Tanaka; Citrus macroptera var. kerrii Swingle; Citrus macroptera var. micrantha (Wester) Tanaka; Citrus macroptera var. southwickii (Wester) Tanaka; Citrus megaloxycarpa Lush.; Citrus megaloxycarpa var. pennivesiculata Lush.; C. micrantha Wester; Citrus micrantha var. balincolong Wester; Citrus micrantha var. microcarpa Wester; Citrus papeda Miq.; Citrus papuana F.M.Bailey; Citrus pennivesiculata (Lush.) Tanaka; Citrus southwickii Wester; Citrus torosa Blanco; Citrus tuberoides J.W.Benn.; Citrus ventricosa Michel; Citrus vitiensis Yu.Tanaka; Citrus westeri Yu.Tanaka; Fortunella sagittifolia K.M.Feng & P.Y.Mao; Papeda rumphii Hassk.

= Kaffir lime =

Citrus fruit native to tropical Southeast Asia

Citrus hystrix, called the kaffir lime, Thai lime or makrut lime, (US: /ˈmækrət/, UK: /məkˈruːt/) is a citrus fruit native to tropical Southeast Asia.

Its fruit and leaves are used in Southeast Asian cuisine, and its essential oil is used in perfumery. Its rind and crushed leaves emit an intense citrus fragrance.

== Names ==
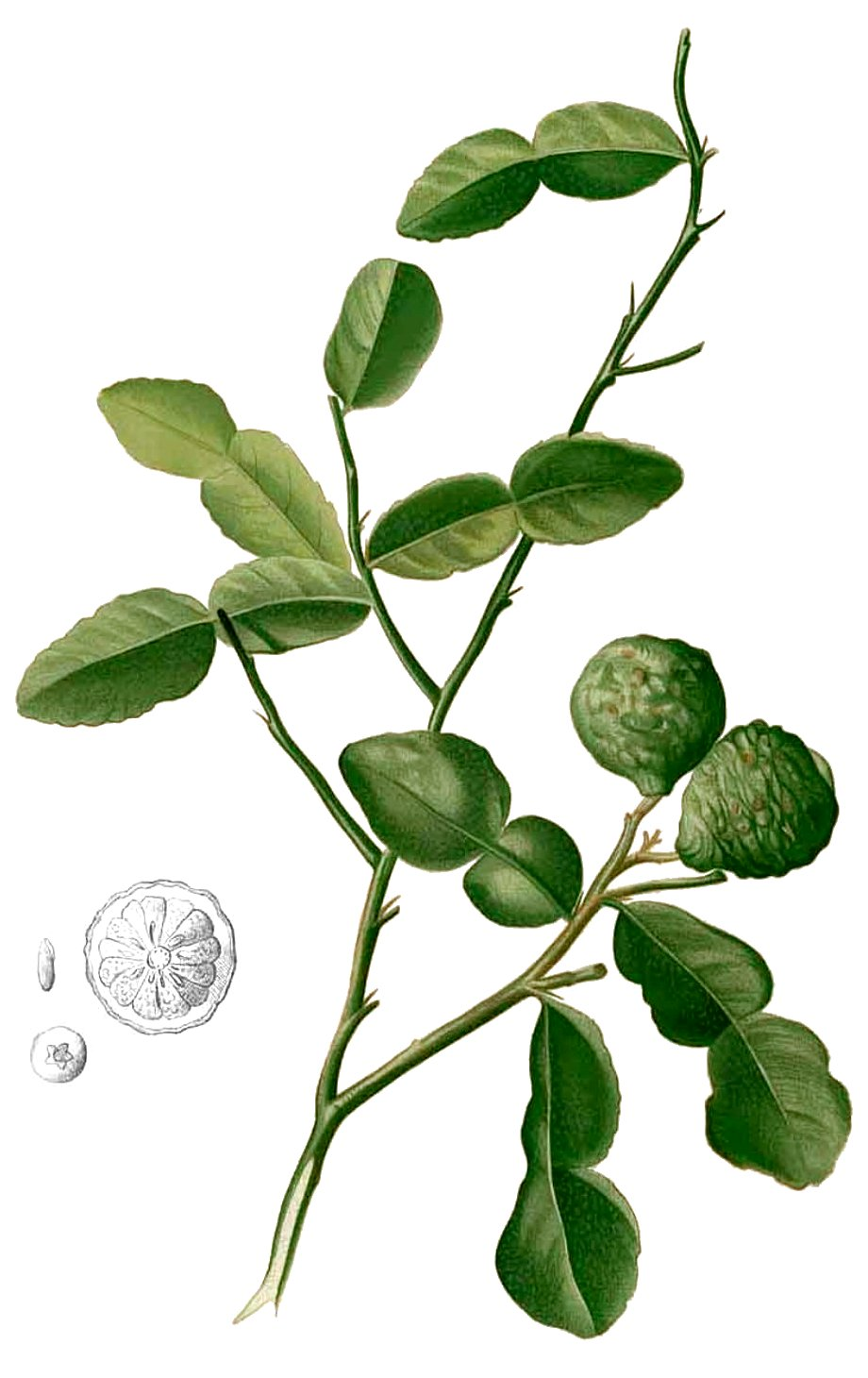
Illustration of C. hystrix by Francisco Manuel Blanco (c. 1880-1883).

The most likely etymology of the primary common name for the fruit, the kaffir lime, is through the Kaffirs, an ethnic group in Sri Lanka partly descended from enslaved Bantu. Another proposed etymology is directly from Indian Muslims of the imported fruit from non-Muslim lands to the east to "convey otherness and exotic provenance".

The earliest known reference, under the alternative spelling "caffre", is in the Emanuel Bonavia text The Cultivated Oranges, Lemons Etc. of India and Ceylon (1888), which notes: "The plantation coolies also smear it over their feet and legs, to keep off land leeches; and therefore in Ceylon [Sri Lanka] it has also got the name of Kudalu dchi, or Leech Lime. Europeans call it Caffre Lime." Similarly, the H.F. Macmillan text A Handbook of Tropical Gardening and Planting (1910) references: "The 'Kaffir Lime' in Ceylon."

Claims that the name of the fruit derives directly from the South African ethnic slur "kaffir" (see "South Africa" below) are not well supported.

"Makrut" comes from Thai: มะกรูด makrud or makrut (pronounced [máʔ.krùːt], name also used for the bergamot orange) encountered in Thai cuisine; it is related to Lao: ໝາກຂີ້ຫູດ mak khi hut (pronounced [ma᷆ːk.kʰi᷆ː.hu᷆ːt]).

=== Native names in other languages ===
C. hystrix is known by other various names in its native areas:

- jêruk purut in Javanese and limau purut in Malay (respectively into Indonesian and Malaysian) both meaning "wart-lime," after the fruit's bumpy texture.
- jiàn yè chéng (箭叶橙 "arrow-leaf lime") in Chinese.
- kabuyaw or kulubot in the Philippines. The city of Cabuyao in Laguna is named after the fruit.
- Kolumichai, கொலுமிச்சை in Kongu Tamil.
- chúc or chanh Thái in Vietnam.
- kroch saech (ក្រូចសើច) in Cambodia
- combava in Réunion Island.

The micrantha, a similar citrus fruit native to the Philippines that is ancestral to several hybrid limes, such as the Key lime and Persian lime, could represent the same species as C. hystrix, but the genomic characterization of the kaffir lime has not been performed in sufficient detail to allow a definitive conclusion.

=== South Africa ===
In the Dutch Cape Colony (today part of South Africa), the Arabic kafir was adopted by Dutch colonists as "kaffir", an ethnic slur for Bantu peoples. In reaction, some authors have favored "makrut lime", a lesser known but more neutral name. In South Africa, it is usually referred to as "Thai lime".

== Description ==
C. hystrix is a thorny shrub or small tree, 2 to 11 metres (6 to 35 ft) tall, with aromatic and distinctively shaped "double" leaves. These hourglass-shaped leaves comprise the leaf blade plus a flattened, leaf-like stalk (botanically, a winged petiole). The fruit is rough and green and ripens to yellow; it is distinguished by its bumpy exterior and small size, approximately 4 cm (2 in) wide. The fruits have thick skins (pericarps) and taste very acidic and slightly bitter. Flowers can have four to five petals that are white in color and are fragrant.

== History ==
Pierre Sonnerat (1748–1814) collected specimens of it in 1771–72, and it appears in Lamarck's Encyclopédie Méthodique (1796).

Makrut lime appears in texts under the name of kaffir lime in 1868, in Ceylon, where rubbing the juice onto legs and socks prevents leech bites. This could be a possible origin of the name leech lime.

== Uses ==
=== Culinary ===
C. hystrix leaves are used in Southeast Asian cuisines such as Indonesian, Laotian, Cambodian, and Thai. The leaves are the most frequently used part of the plant, fresh, dried, or frozen. The leaves are widely used in Thai cuisine (for dishes such as tom yum) and Cambodian cuisine (for the base paste "krueng"). The leaves are used in Vietnamese cuisine to add fragrance to chicken dishes and to decrease the pungent odor when steaming snails. Also, in Vietnamese villages that harvest silkworms, the silkworms in the pupa stage are stir-fried with the kaffir lime leaves. The leaves are used in Indonesian cuisine (especially Balinese cuisine and Javanese cuisine) for foods such as soto ayam and are used along with Indonesian bay leaf for chicken and fish. They are also found in Malaysian and Burmese cuisines.

The rind (peel) is commonly used in Lao and Thai curry paste, adding an aromatic, astringent flavor. The zest of the fruit, referred to as combava, is used in creole cuisine to impart flavor in infused rums and rougails in Mauritius, Réunion, and Madagascar. In Cambodia, the entire fruit is crystallized or candied for eating.

=== Medicinal ===
The juice and rinds of the peel are used in traditional medicine in some Asian countries; the fruit's juice is often used in shampoo and is believed to kill head lice.

=== Other uses ===
The juice is used as a cleanser for clothing and hair in Thailand and occasionally in Cambodia. Lustral water mixed with slices of the fruit is used in religious ceremonies in Cambodia.

Makrut lime oil is used as raw material in many fields, including pharmaceutical, agronomic, food, sanitary, cosmetic, and perfume industries. It is also used extensively in aromatherapy and as an essential ingredient in various cosmetic and beauty products.

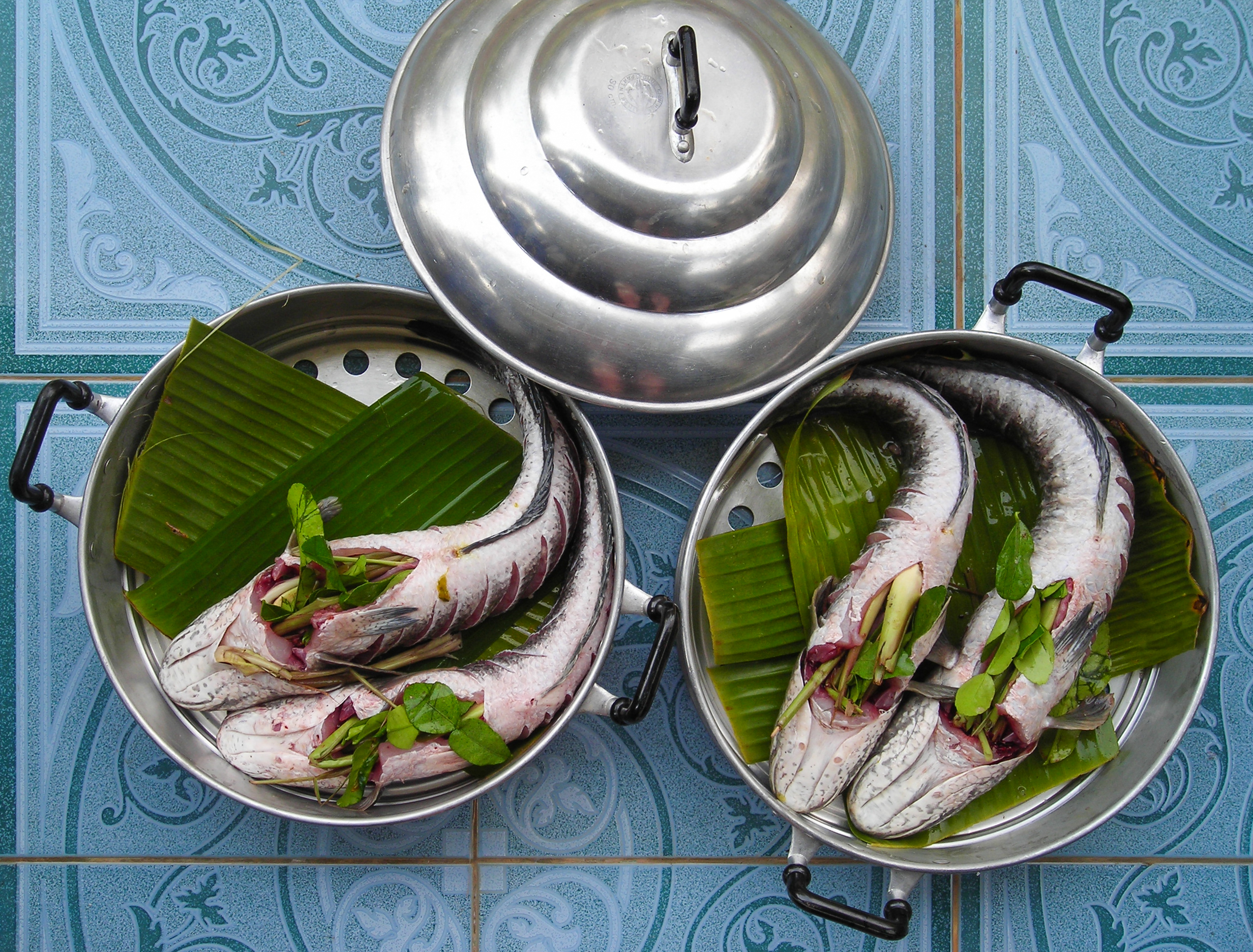
Striped snakehead fish stuffed with C. hystrix and lemongrass in preparation for steaming

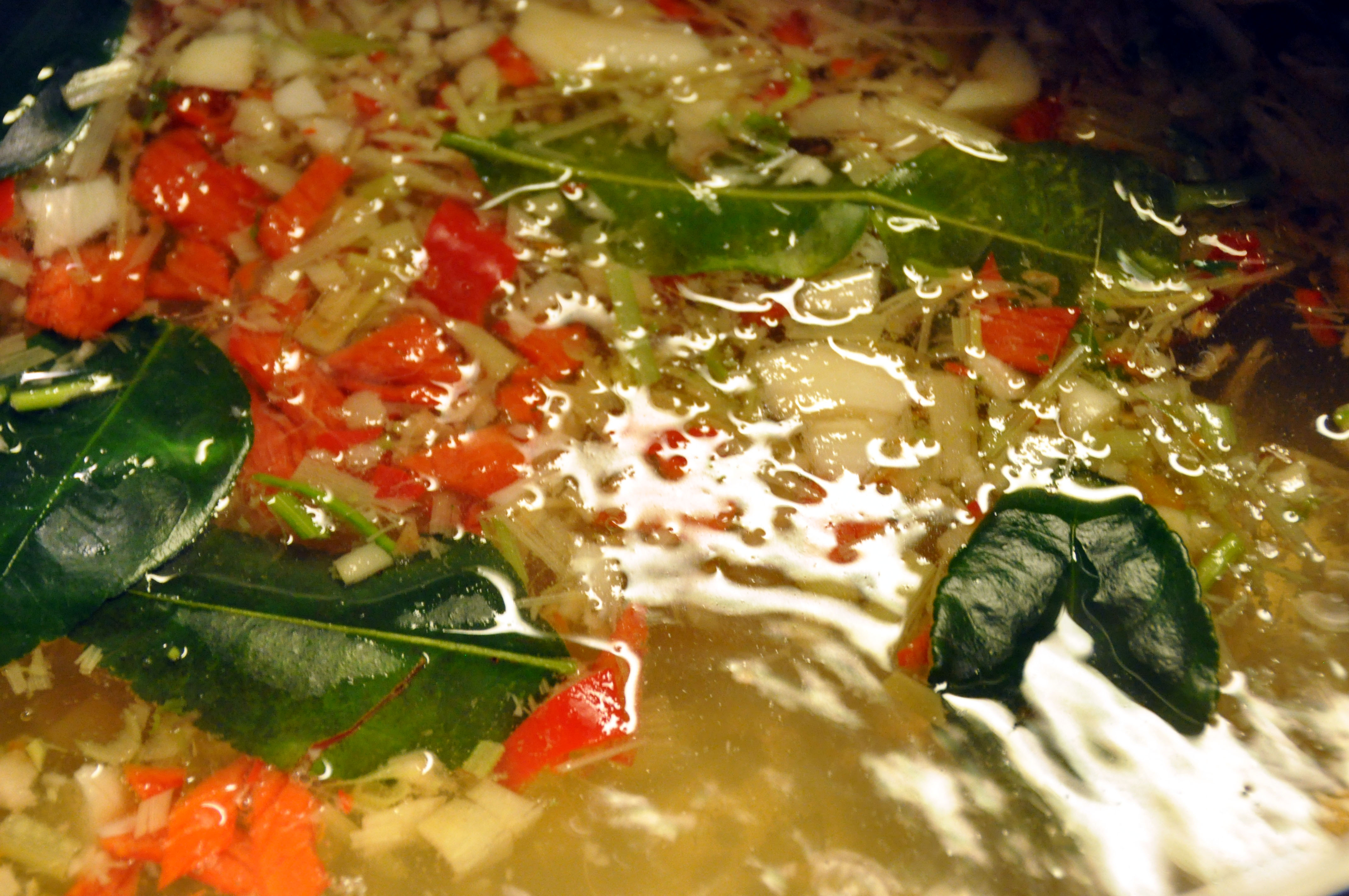
C. hystrix leaves floating in tom yum

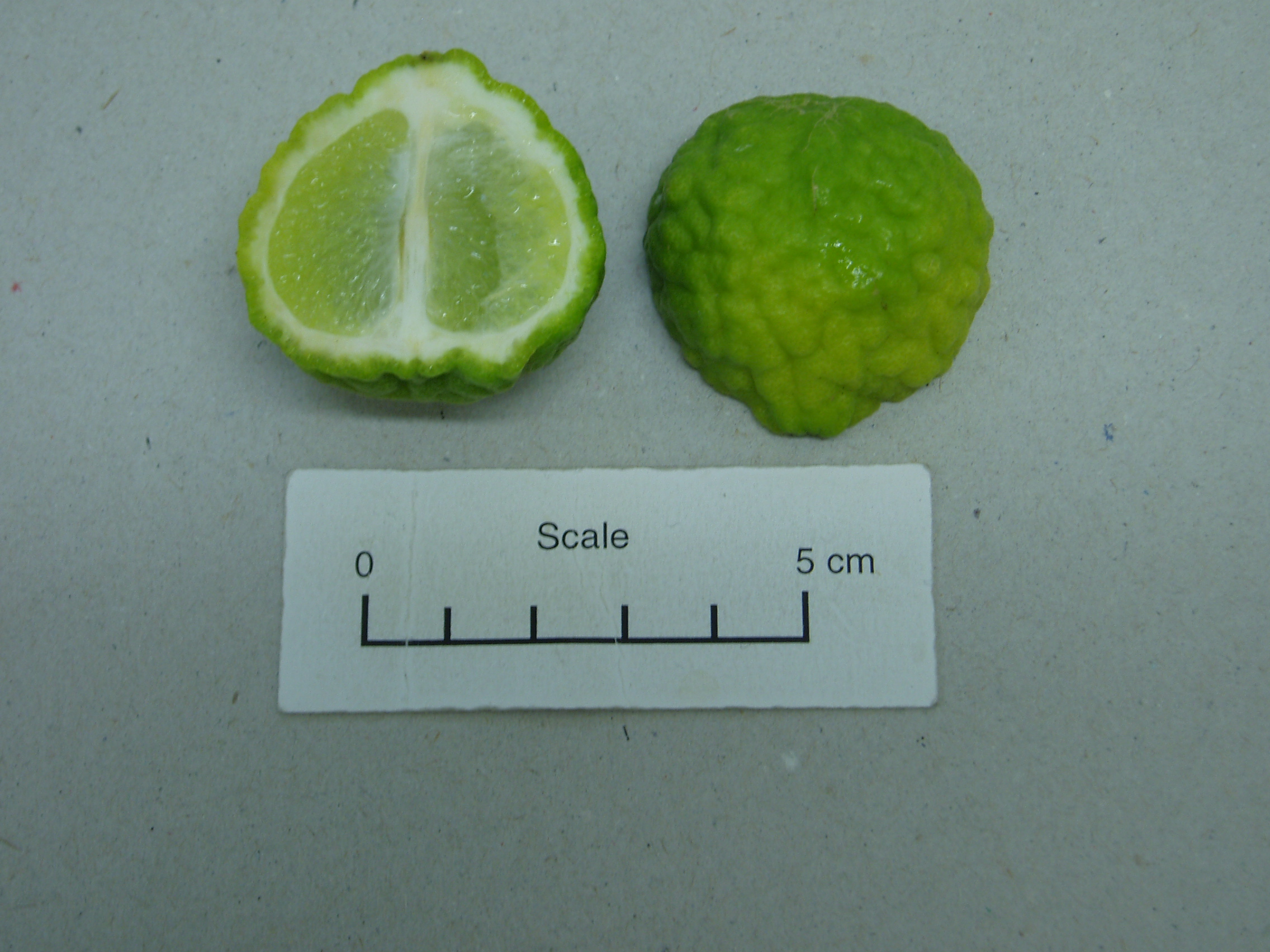
Fruit longitudinal section

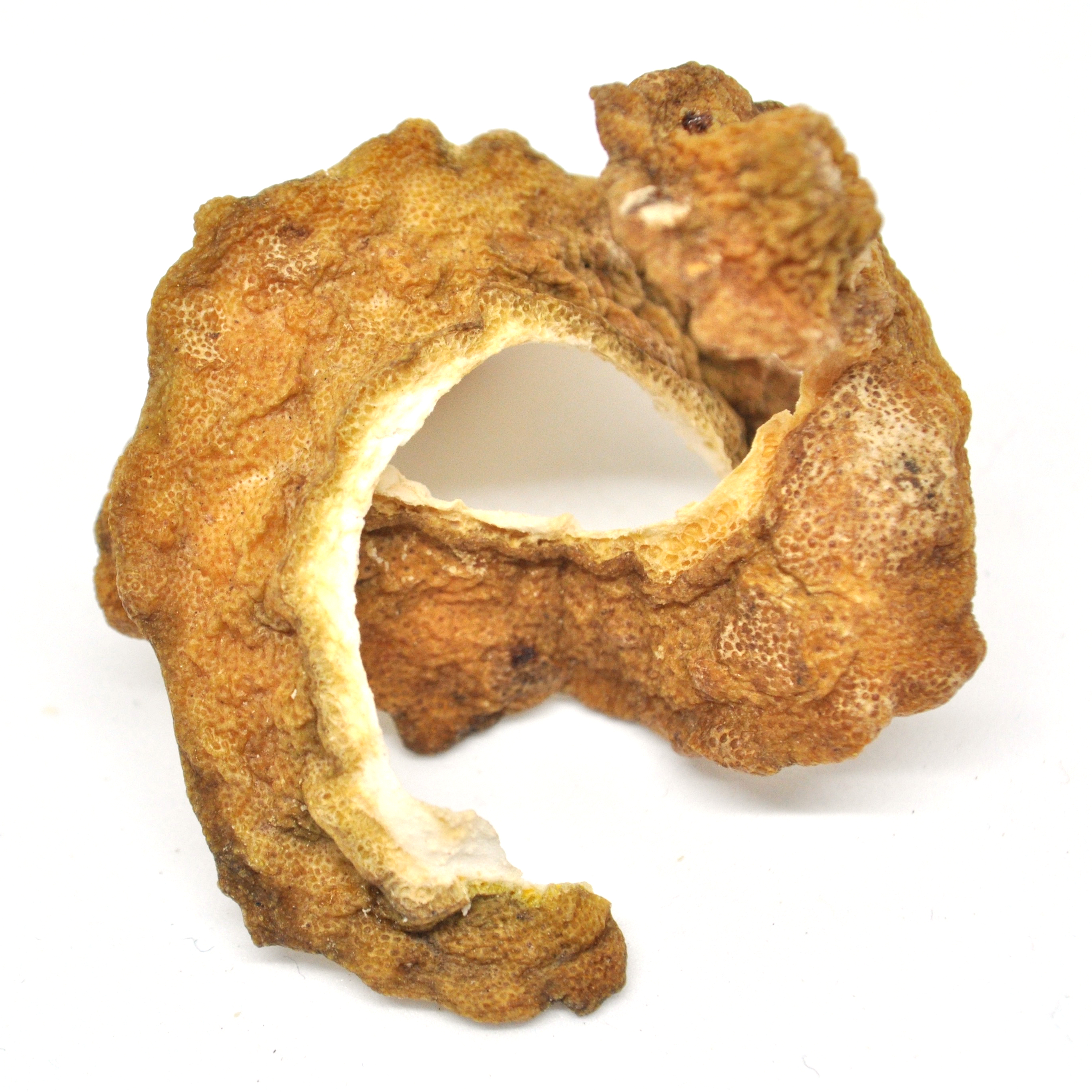
Dried fruit rinds

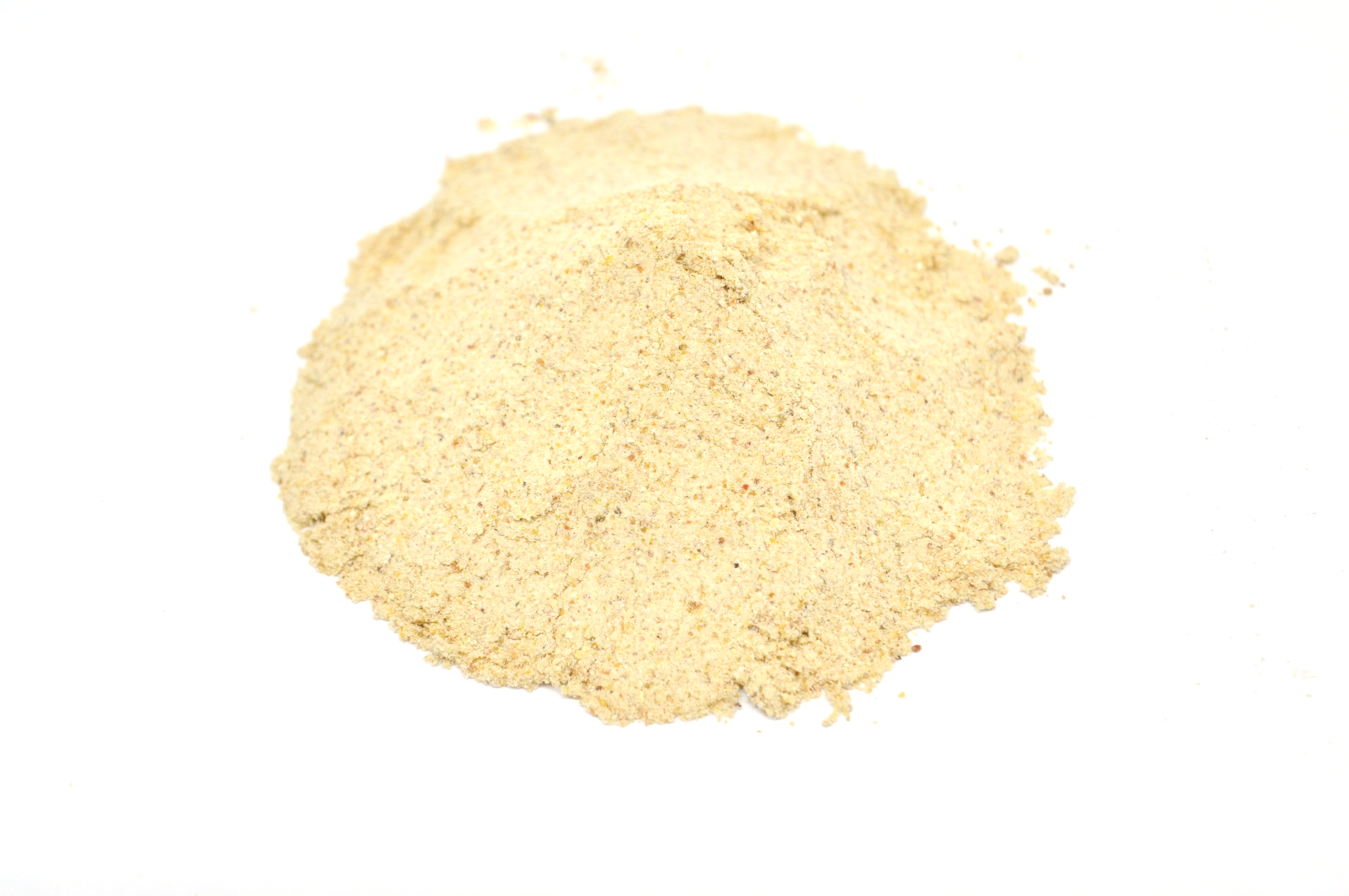
Powdered fruit rind, used in Malagasy cuisine

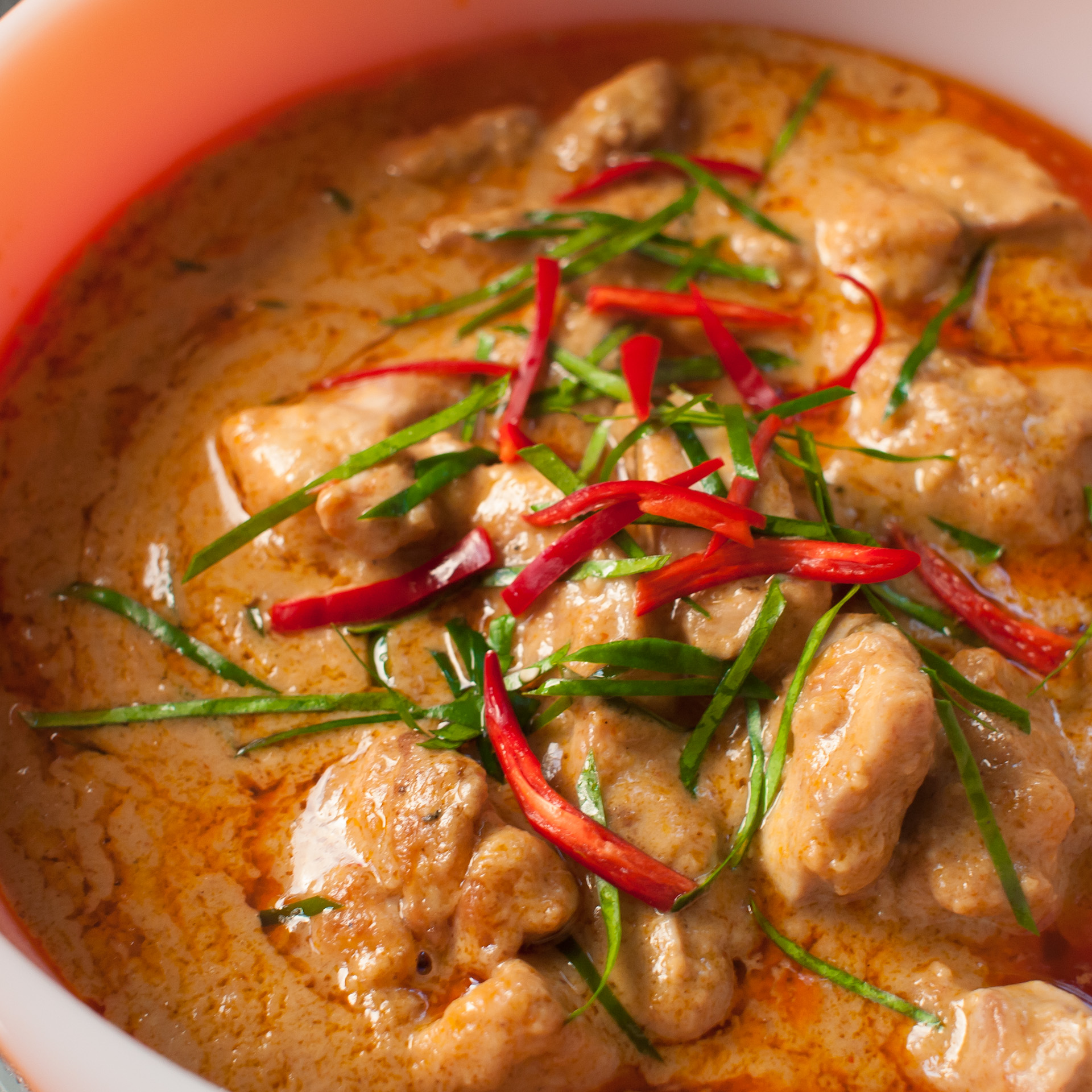
Cut leaf strips on chicken phanaeng

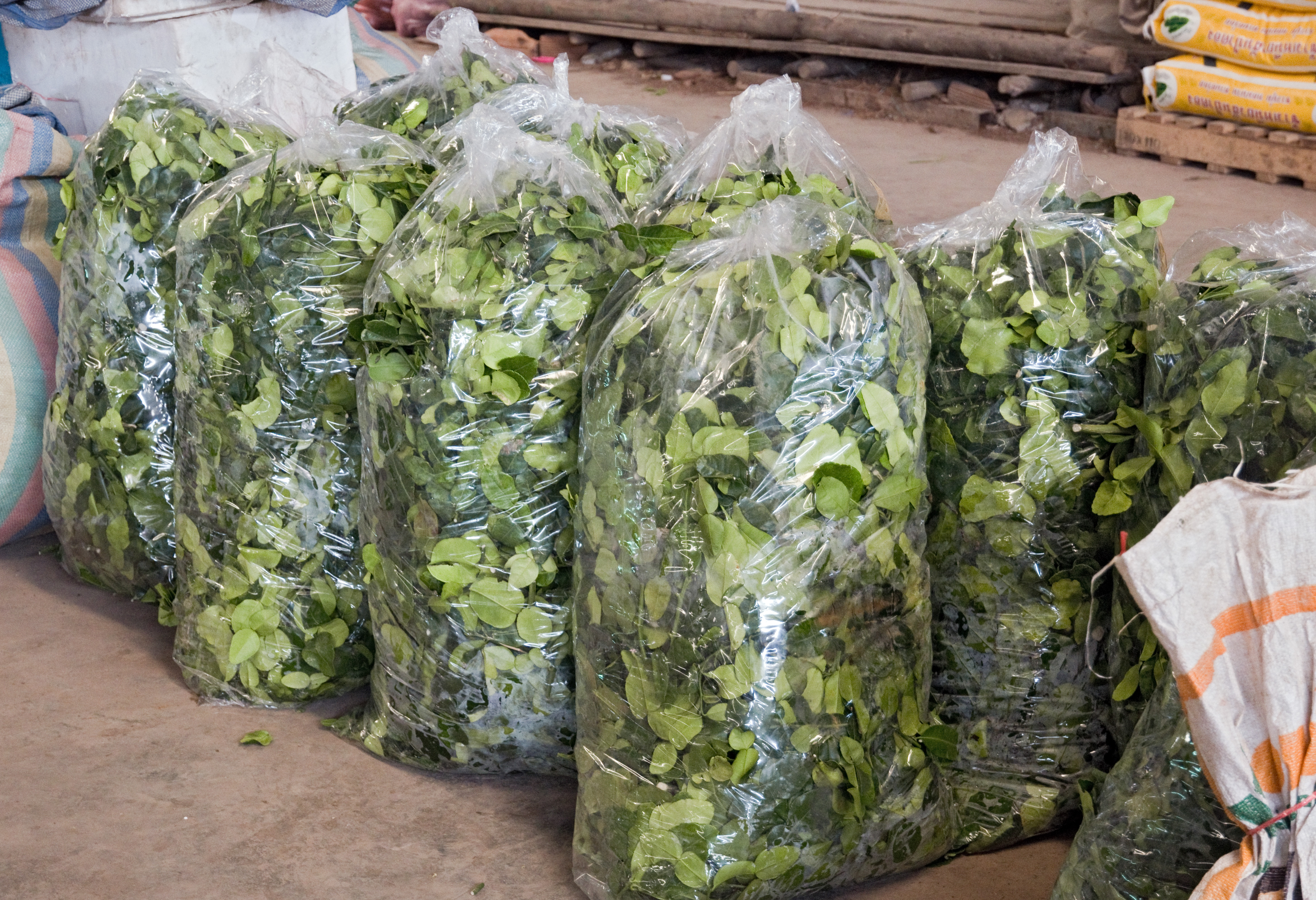
C. hystrix leaves for sale in Phou Puy Wholesale Vegetable Market in Battambang, Cambodia (August 2022)

== Cultivation ==
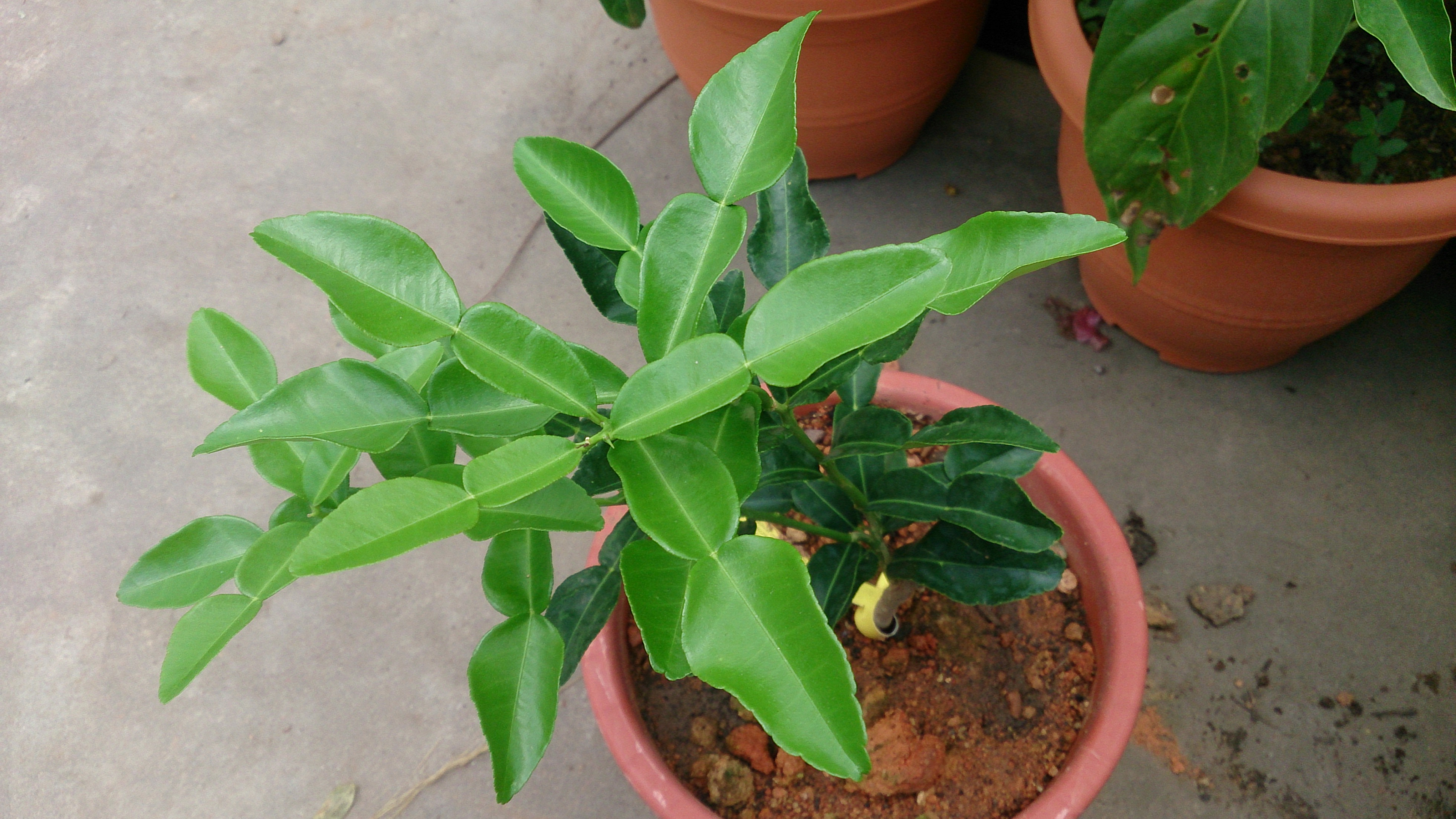
Small C. hystrix shrub in pot

C. hystrix is grown worldwide in suitable climates as a garden shrub for home fruit production. It is well suited to container gardens and for large garden pots on patios, terraces, and in conservatories.

== Main constituents ==
The compound responsible for the characteristic aroma was identified as (–)-(S)-citronellal, which is contained in the leaf oil up to 80 percent; minor components include citronellol (10 percent), nerol and limonene.

From a stereochemical point of view, it is remarkable that makrut lime leaves contain only the (S) stereoisomer of citronellal, whereas its enantiomer, (+)-(R)-citronellal is found in both lemon balm and (to a lesser degree) lemon grass, (however, citronellal is only a trace component in the latter's essential oil).

Makrut lime fruit peel contains an essential oil comparable to lime fruit peel oil; its main components are limonene and β-pinene.

== Toxicity ==
C. hystrix contains significant quantities of furanocoumarins, in both the peel and the pulp. Furanocoumarins are known to cause phytophotodermatitis, a potentially severe skin inflammation. Cases of phytophotodermatitis induced by external use of C. hystrix have been reported.

== See also ==
- Citrus taxonomy – Botanical classification of the genus Citrus
