= List of Scutellaria species =

The following species in the flowering plant genus Scutellaria, the skullcaps, are accepted by Plants of the World Online. Species are somewhat difficult to delineate by traditional morphological methods.

- Scutellaria adenostegia Briq.
- Scutellaria adenotricha X.H.Guo & S.B.Zhou
- Scutellaria adsurgens Popov
- Scutellaria agrestis A.St.-Hil. ex Benth.
- Scutellaria alabamensis Alexander
- Scutellaria albida L.
- Scutellaria albituba A.Pool
- Scutellaria alborosea Lem.
- Scutellaria alpina L.
- Scutellaria alta M.E.Jones
- Scutellaria altaica Ledeb. ex Sweet
- Scutellaria altamaha Small
- Scutellaria altissima L.
- Scutellaria amabilis H.Hara
- Scutellaria amicorum Rech.f.
- Scutellaria amoena C.H.Wright
- Scutellaria amphichlora Juz.
- Scutellaria anatolica Çiçek & Ketenoglu
- Scutellaria andamanica Prain
- Scutellaria andrachnoides Vved.
- Scutellaria androssovii Juz.
- Scutellaria angrenica Juz. & Vved.
- Scutellaria angustifolia Pursh
- Scutellaria anhweiensis C.Y.Wu
- Scutellaria anitae Juz.
- Scutellaria anomala Epling
- Scutellaria antirrhinoides Benth.
- Scutellaria arabica Jaub. & Spach
- Scutellaria arakensis Jamzad & Safikhani
- Scutellaria aramberrana B.L.Turner
- Scutellaria araxensis Grossh.
- Scutellaria arenicola Small
- Scutellaria arguta Buckley
- Scutellaria ariana Hedge
- Scutellaria artvinensis Grossh.
- Scutellaria asperiflora Nakai
- Scutellaria assamica Mukerjee
- Scutellaria atrocyanea Epling & Játiva
- Scutellaria attenuifolia Suddee & A.J.Paton
- Scutellaria aurantiaca A.Pool
- Scutellaria aurata Lem.
- Scutellaria aurea B.L.Rob. & Greenm.
- Scutellaria axilliflora Hand.-Mazz.
- Scutellaria baicalensis Georgi
- Scutellaria baldshuanica Nevski ex Juz.
- Scutellaria balearica Barceló
- Scutellaria bambusetorum C.Y.Wu
- Scutellaria barbata D.Don
- Scutellaria bartlettii B.L.Turner
- Scutellaria benthamiana (Mansf.) Epling
- Scutellaria blepharophylla Epling
- Scutellaria bolanderi A.Gray
- Scutellaria bornmuelleri Hausskn. ex Bornm.
- Scutellaria botbaevae Lazkov
- Scutellaria botschantzevii M.N.Abdull.
- Scutellaria brachyspica Nakai & H.Hara
- Scutellaria brevibracteata Stapf
- Scutellaria brittonii Porter
- Scutellaria bucharica Juz.
- Scutellaria bushii Britton
- Scutellaria calcarata C.Y.Wu & H.W.Li
- Scutellaria californica A.Gray
- Scutellaria cardiophylla Engelm. & A.Gray
- Scutellaria carmenensis Henrard
- Scutellaria caryopteroides Hand.-Mazz.
- Scutellaria catharinae Juz.
- Scutellaria caucasica A.Ham.
- Scutellaria caudifolia Y.Z.Sun
- Scutellaria chaematochlora Juz.
- Scutellaria chalicophila Loes.
- Scutellaria chamaedrifolia Hedge & A.J.Paton
- Scutellaria chekiangensis C.Y.Wu
- Scutellaria chenopodiifolia Juz.
- Scutellaria chevalieri Briq.
- Scutellaria chiangii B.L.Turner
- Scutellaria chihshuiensis C.Y.Wu & H.W.Li
- Scutellaria chimenensis C.Y.Wu
- Scutellaria chodshakasiani Kamelin ex Kochk.
- Scutellaria chungtienensis C.Y.Wu
- Scutellaria × churchilliana Fernald
- Scutellaria coccinea Kunth
- Scutellaria cochinchinensis Briq.
- Scutellaria colebrookeana Wall. ex Benth.
- Scutellaria colpodea Nevski
- Scutellaria columnae All.
- Scutellaria comosa Juz.
- Scutellaria cordifolia (Schltdl. & Cham.) Benth.
- Scutellaria cordifrons Juz.
- Scutellaria costaricana H.Wendl.
- Scutellaria cristata Popov
- Scutellaria cuatrecasasiana Fern.Alonso
- Scutellaria cuevasiana J.G.González & A.Vázquez
- Scutellaria cyanocheila Epling
- Scutellaria cylindriflora Epling & Játiva
- Scutellaria cypria Rech.f.
- Scutellaria daghestanica Grossh.
- Scutellaria darriensis Grossh.
- Scutellaria darvasica Juz.
- Scutellaria delavayi H.Lév.
- Scutellaria dependens Maxim.
- Scutellaria diffusa Benth.
- Scutellaria discolor Wall. ex Benth.
- Scutellaria dombeyi ined.
- Scutellaria drummondii Benth.
- Scutellaria dumetorum Schltdl.
- Scutellaria durangensis B.L.Turner
- Scutellaria ebracteata A.Pool
- Scutellaria edelbergii Rech.f.
- Scutellaria elliptica Muhl.
- Scutellaria eplingii Legname
- Scutellaria farsistanica Rech.f.
- Scutellaria fauriei H.Lév. & Vaniot
- Scutellaria fedschenkoi Bornm.
- Scutellaria filicaulis Regel
- Scutellaria flabellulata Juz.
- Scutellaria flocculosa Epling & Mathias
- Scutellaria floridana Chapm.
- Scutellaria formosa Leonard
- Scutellaria formosana N.E.Br.
- Scutellaria forrestii Diels
- Scutellaria fragillima Rech.f.
- Scutellaria franchetiana H.Lév.
- Scutellaria fraxinea Epling
- Scutellaria fruticetorum Epling
- Scutellaria galericulata L.
- Scutellaria galerita Epling
- Scutellaria gardoquioides Benth.
- Scutellaria gaumeri Leonard
- Scutellaria ghorana Hedge
- Scutellaria glabra Leonard
- Scutellaria glabrata Vved.
- Scutellaria glabriuscula Fernald
- Scutellaria glandulosa Hook.f.
- Scutellaria glaphymstachys Rech.f.
- Scutellaria glechomoides Boiss. ex Benth.
- Scutellaria glutinosa Benth.
- Scutellaria gontscharovii Juz.
- Scutellaria goulimyi Rech.f.
- Scutellaria grandiflora Sims
- Scutellaria granulosa Juz.
- Scutellaria grossa Wall.
- Scutellaria grossecrenata Merr. & Chun ex C.Y.Wu
- Scutellaria grossheimiana Juz.
- Scutellaria guatemalensis Leonard
- Scutellaria guilielmi A.Gray
- Scutellaria guttata Nevski ex Juz.
- Scutellaria haesitabunda Juz. ex Kochk.
- Scutellaria hainanensis C.Y.Wu
- Scutellaria hastifolia L.
- Scutellaria havanensis Jacq.
- Scutellaria helenae Albov
- Scutellaria heterophylla Montbret & Aucher ex Benth.
- Scutellaria heterotricha Juz. & Vved.
- Scutellaria heydei Hook.f.
- Scutellaria hintoniana Epling
- Scutellaria hintoniorum Henrard
- Scutellaria hirta Sm.
- Scutellaria hispidula B.L.Rob.
- Scutellaria hissarica B.Fedtsch.
- Scutellaria holguinensis I.E.Méndez
- Scutellaria holosericea Gontsch. ex Juz.
- Scutellaria honanensis C.Y.Wu & H.W.Li
- Scutellaria hookeri Epling
- Scutellaria hsiehii T.H.Hsieh
- Scutellaria humilis R.Br.
- Scutellaria hunanensis C.Y.Wu
- Scutellaria hypericifolia H.Lév.
- Scutellaria immaculata Nevski ex Juz.
- Scutellaria incana Biehler
- Scutellaria incarnata Vent.
- Scutellaria incisa Y.Z.Sun ex C.H.Hu
- Scutellaria incurva Wall.
- Scutellaria indica L.
- Scutellaria inflata Epling
- Scutellaria inghokensis Metcalf
- Scutellaria insignis Nakai
- Scutellaria integrifolia L.
- Scutellaria intermedia Popov
- Scutellaria irrasa Epling
- Scutellaria iskanderi Juz.
- Scutellaria isocheila Donn.Sm.
- Scutellaria iyoensis Nakai
- Scutellaria jaliscana Epling
- Scutellaria javanica Jungh.
- Scutellaria jodudiana B.Fedtsch.
- Scutellaria juzepczukii Gontsch.
- Scutellaria kamelinii M.N.Abdull.
- Scutellaria karatavica Juz.
- Scutellaria karjaginii Grossh.
- Scutellaria karkaralensis Juz.
- Scutellaria × ketenoglui Çiçek & Yaprak
- Scutellaria khaoyaiensis A.J.Paton
- Scutellaria khasiana C.B.Clarke ex Hook.f.
- Scutellaria kikai-insularis Hatus. ex T.Yamaz.
- Scutellaria kingiana Prain
- Scutellaria kiusiana H.Hara
- Scutellaria knorringiae Juz.
- Scutellaria kotkaiensis Rech.f.
- Scutellaria krasevii Kom. & I.Schischk. ex Juz.
- Scutellaria kugarti Juz.
- Scutellaria kujuensis Kadota & Mas.Saito
- Scutellaria kuromidakensis (Yahara) T.Yamaz.
- Scutellaria kurssanovii Pavlov
- Scutellaria lacei Hedge & A.J.Paton
- Scutellaria lactea A.Pool
- Scutellaria laeteviolacea Koidz.
- Scutellaria laevis Shinners
- Scutellaria langbianensis Wernham
- Scutellaria lanipes Juz.
- Scutellaria lateriflora L.
- Scutellaria laxa Dunn
- Scutellaria leptosiphon Nevski
- Scutellaria leptostegia Juz.
- Scutellaria leucantha Loes.
- Scutellaria likiangensis Diels
- Scutellaria lilungensis S.S.Ying
- Scutellaria linarioides C.Y.Wu
- Scutellaria linczewskii Juz.
- Scutellaria lindbergii Rech.f.
- Scutellaria lindeniana Benth.
- Scutellaria linearis Benth.
- Scutellaria lipskyi Juz.
- Scutellaria litwinowii Bornm. & Sint.
- Scutellaria longifolia Benth.
- Scutellaria longituba Koidz.
- Scutellaria lotienensis C.Y.Wu & S.Chow
- Scutellaria lundellii Epling
- Scutellaria lushuiensis Qiang Wang
- Scutellaria lutea J.D.Sm.
- Scutellaria luteocaerulea Bornm. & Sint.
- Scutellaria lutescens C.Y.Wu
- Scutellaria lutilabia T.M.Lane & G.L.Nesom
- Scutellaria macra Epling
- Scutellaria macrochlamys Rech.f. & Fitz
- Scutellaria macrodonta Hand.-Mazz.
- Scutellaria macrosiphon C.Y.Wu
- Scutellaria mairei H.Lév.
- Scutellaria maxonii Leonard
- Scutellaria meehanioides C.Y.Wu
- Scutellaria megalaspis Rech.f.
- Scutellaria megalodonta Juz.
- Scutellaria megaphylla C.Y.Wu & H.W.Li
- Scutellaria mellichampii Small
- Scutellaria mesostegia Juz.
- Scutellaria mexicana (Torr.) A.J.Paton
- Scutellaria microdasys Juz.
- Scutellaria microphylla Moc. & Sessé ex Benth.
- Scutellaria microphysa Juz.
- Scutellaria microviolacea C.Y.Wu
- Scutellaria × minkwitziae Juz.
- Scutellaria minor Huds.
- Scutellaria mocinoana Benth.
- Scutellaria modesta Játiva & Epling
- Scutellaria molanguitensis Hiriart
- Scutellaria molinarum A.Pool
- Scutellaria mollifolia C.Y.Wu & H.W.Li
- Scutellaria mollis R.Br.
- Scutellaria mongolica Sobolevsk.
- Scutellaria moniliorhiza Kom.
- Scutellaria montana Chapm.
- Scutellaria monterreyana B.L.Turner
- Scutellaria mulleri B.L.Turner
- Scutellaria multicaulis Boiss.
- Scutellaria multiflora Benth.
- Scutellaria multiglandulosa (Kearney) Small ex Harper
- Scutellaria multiramosa A.Pool
- Scutellaria muramatsui H.Hara
- Scutellaria muriculata Epling
- Scutellaria muzquiziana B.L.Turner
- Scutellaria nana A.Gray
- Scutellaria navicularis Juz.
- Scutellaria nepetifolia Benth.
- Scutellaria nepetoides Popov ex Juz.
- Scutellaria nervosa Pursh
- Scutellaria neubaueri Rech.f.
- Scutellaria × neumannii H.Melzer & Bregant
- Scutellaria nevskii Juz. & Vved.
- Scutellaria × nicholsonii Taub.
- Scutellaria nigricans C.Y.Wu
- Scutellaria nigrocardia C.Y.Wu & H.W.Li
- Scutellaria novae-zelandiae Hook.f.
- Scutellaria novorossica Juz.
- Scutellaria nummulariifolia Hook.f.
- Scutellaria oaxacana Greenm.
- Scutellaria oblonga Benth.
- Scutellaria oblongifolia A.Pool
- Scutellaria obtusifolia Hemsl.
- Scutellaria ocellata Juz.
- Scutellaria ochotensis Prob.
- Scutellaria ocmulgee Small
- Scutellaria ocymoides (Kunth) Epling
- Scutellaria oligodonta Juz.
- Scutellaria oligophlebia Merr. & Chun ex C.Y.Wu & S.Chow
- Scutellaria omeiensis C.Y.Wu
- Scutellaria orbicularis Bunge
- Scutellaria oreophila Grossh.
- Scutellaria orichalcea J.D.Sm.
- Scutellaria orientalis L.
- Scutellaria orizabensis Epling
- Scutellaria orthocalyx Hand.-Mazz.
- Scutellaria orthotricha C.Y.Wu & H.W.Li
- Scutellaria oschtenica Juz.
- Scutellaria ossethica Kharadze
- Scutellaria ovata Hill
- Scutellaria oxystegia Juz.
- Scutellaria pacifica Juz.
- Scutellaria pallidiflora Epling
- Scutellaria pamirica Juz.
- Scutellaria paradoxa Galushko
- Scutellaria parrae Fern.Alonso
- Scutellaria parvula Michx.
- Scutellaria patonii Jamzad & Safikhani
- Scutellaria paulsenii Briq.
- Scutellaria pekinensis Maxim.
- Scutellaria persica Bornm.
- Scutellaria petersoniae B.L.Turner & Reveal
- Scutellaria petiolata Hemsl. ex Lace & Prain
- Scutellaria phyllostachya Juz.
- Scutellaria physocalyx Regel & Schmalh.
- Scutellaria picta Juz.
- Scutellaria pingbienensis C.Y.Wu & H.W.Li
- Scutellaria pinnatifida A.Ham.
- Scutellaria platensis Speg.
- Scutellaria platystegia Juz.
- Scutellaria platystoma Epling
- Scutellaria playfairii Kudô
- Scutellaria poecilantha Nevski ex Juz.
- Scutellaria poliochlora Rech.f. & Edelb.
- Scutellaria polyadena Briq.
- Scutellaria polyadenia Rech.f.
- Scutellaria polyphylla Juz.
- Scutellaria polytricha Juz.
- Scutellaria pontica K.Koch
- Scutellaria popovii Vved.
- Scutellaria porphyrantha Rech.f.
- Scutellaria potosina Brandegee
- Scutellaria prilipkoana Grossh.
- Scutellaria prostrata Jacquem. ex Benth.
- Scutellaria przewalskii Juz.
- Scutellaria pseudocoerulea Briq.
- Scutellaria pseudocoleus Fern.Alonso
- Scutellaria pseudoserrata Epling
- Scutellaria pseudotenax C.Y.Wu
- Scutellaria purpurascens Sw.
- Scutellaria purpureocardia C.Y.Wu
- Scutellaria pycnoclada Juz.
- Scutellaria quadrilobulata Y.Z.Sun
- Scutellaria racemosa Pers.
- Scutellaria raddeana Juz.
- Scutellaria ramosissima Popov
- Scutellaria ramozanica Parsa
- Scutellaria regeliana Nakai
- Scutellaria rehderiana Diels
- Scutellaria repens Buch.-Ham. ex D.Don
- Scutellaria resinosa Torr.
- Scutellaria reticulata C.Y.Wu & W.T.Wang
- Scutellaria rhomboidalis Grossh.
- Scutellaria robusta Benth.
- Scutellaria rosei Fernald
- Scutellaria roseocyanea Epling
- Scutellaria rubicunda Hornem.
- Scutellaria rubromaculata Juz. & Vved.
- Scutellaria rubropunctata Hayata
- Scutellaria rupestris Boiss. & Heldr.
- Scutellaria russelioides Epling
- Scutellaria salviifolia Benth.
- Scutellaria sapphirina (Barneby) Olmstead
- Scutellaria sarmentosa Epling
- Scutellaria saslayensis A.Pool
- Scutellaria saxatilis Riddell
- Scutellaria scandens D.Don
- Scutellaria schachristanica Juz.
- Scutellaria schugnanica B.Fedtsch.
- Scutellaria schweinfurthii Briq.
- Scutellaria sciaphila S.Moore
- Scutellaria scordiifolia Fisch. ex Schrank
- Scutellaria scutellarioides (Kunth) Harley
- Scutellaria sedelmeyerae Juz.
- Scutellaria seleriana Loes.
- Scutellaria semicircularis S.Moore
- Scutellaria serboana B.L.Turner
- Scutellaria serrata Andrews
- Scutellaria sessilifolia Hemsl.
- Scutellaria sevanensis Sosn. ex Grossh.
- Scutellaria shansiensis C.Y.Wu & H.W.Li
- Scutellaria shikokiana Makino
- Scutellaria shweliensis W.W.Sm.
- Scutellaria sibthorpii (Benth.) Halácsy
- Scutellaria sichourensis C.Y.Wu & H.W.Li
- Scutellaria sieberi Benth.
- Scutellaria sieversii Bunge
- Scutellaria siphocampyloides Vatke
- Scutellaria sipilensis Cuevas
- Scutellaria slametensis Sudarmono & B.J.Conn
- Scutellaria somalensis Thulin
- Scutellaria sosnowskyi Takht.
- Scutellaria sporadum Bothmer
- Scutellaria squarrosa Nevski
- Scutellaria stachyoides Epling
- Scutellaria stenosiphon Hemsl.
- Scutellaria stewartii B.L.Turner
- Scutellaria stocksii Boiss.
- Scutellaria striatella Gontsch.
- Scutellaria strigillosa Hemsl.
- Scutellaria subcaespitosa Pavlov
- Scutellaria subcordata Juz.
- Scutellaria subintegra C.Y.Wu & H.W.Li
- Scutellaria sublitoralis J.G.González
- Scutellaria suffrutescens S.Watson
- Scutellaria supina L.
- Scutellaria swatensis Murata
- Scutellaria szovitziana Bunge
- Scutellaria tabrisiana Grossh.
- Scutellaria taiwanensis C.Y.Wu
- Scutellaria talamancana A.Pool
- Scutellaria talassica Juz.
- Scutellaria tapintzensis C.Y.Wu & H.W.Li
- Scutellaria tarokoensis T.Yamaz.
- Scutellaria tatianae Juz.
- Scutellaria tauricola Hand.-Mazz.
- Scutellaria tayloriana Dunn
- Scutellaria tenasserimensis A.J.Paton
- Scutellaria tenax W.W.Sm.
- Scutellaria tenera C.Y.Wu & H.W.Li
- Scutellaria teniana Hand.-Mazz.
- Scutellaria tenuiflora C.Y.Wu
- Scutellaria tenuipetiolata A.Pool
- Scutellaria ternejica Prob.
- Scutellaria texana B.L.Turner
- Scutellaria theobromina Rech.f.
- Scutellaria tienchuanensis C.Y.Wu & C.Chen
- Scutellaria titovii Juz.
- Scutellaria toguztoravensis Juz.
- Scutellaria tomentosa Bertol.
- Scutellaria tortumensis (Kit Tan & Sorger) A.P.Khokhr.
- Scutellaria tournefortii Benth.
- Scutellaria tsinyunensis C.Y.Wu & S.Chow
- Scutellaria tuberifera C.Y.Wu & C.Chen
- Scutellaria tuberosa Benth.
- Scutellaria tubiflora Benth.
- Scutellaria tucurriquensis A.Pool
- Scutellaria tuminensis Nakai
- Scutellaria turgaica Juz.
- Scutellaria tutensis A.Pool
- Scutellaria tuvensis Juz.
- Scutellaria uliginosa A.St.-Hil. ex Benth.
- Scutellaria umbratilis Epling
- Scutellaria urticifolia Juz. & Vved.
- Scutellaria utriculata Labill.
- Scutellaria valdiviana (Clos) Epling
- Scutellaria velutina Juz. & Vved.
- Scutellaria villosissima Gontsch. ex Juz.
- Scutellaria violacea B.Heyne ex Benth.
- Scutellaria violascens Gürke
- Scutellaria viscidula Bunge
- Scutellaria vitifolia Brandegee
- Scutellaria volubilis Kunth
- Scutellaria weishanensis C.Y.Wu & H.W.Li
- Scutellaria wendtii Henrard
- Scutellaria wenshanensis C.Y.Wu & H.W.Li
- Scutellaria wightiana Benth.
- Scutellaria wongkei Dunn
- Scutellaria woodii J.M.Mercado
- Scutellaria wrightii A.Gray
- Scutellaria wuana C.L.Xiang & F.Zhao
- Scutellaria xanthosiphon Juz.
- Scutellaria xylorrhiza Bornm.
- Scutellaria yangbiensis H.W.Li
- Scutellaria yezoensis Kudô
- Scutellaria yildirimlii Çiçek & Yaprak
- Scutellaria yingtakensis Y.Z.Sun
- Scutellaria yunnanensis H.Lév.
- Scutellaria yunyiana B.Y.Ding, Z.H.Chen & X.F.Jin
- Scutellaria zaprjagaevii Kochk. & Zhogoleva
- Scutellaria zivari Akhmed-zade
