= Cephalocereus swartzii =

Cephalocereus swartzii is a name which has been used for two species of cactus:

- Cephalocereus swartzii (Griseb.) Britton & Rose is a synonym of Stenocereus heptagonus.
- As used by Britton and Rose in 1909, Cephalocereus swartzii is an incorrect name for Pilosocereus jamaicensis.
