= Pilosocereus royenii =

Pilosocereus royenii is a name which has been used in different senses for a species of cactus. In the past, it has been treated as a distinct species with a wide distribution in the Caribbean and Mexico. As of June 2025, it is not accepted by Plants of the World Online.

- Populations in Puerto Rico and the Virgin Islands that have been treated as the variety armatus of Pilosocereus royenii are considered to be Pilosocereus armatus (Otto ex Pfeiff.) A.R.Franck.
- Populations in southeast Cuba that have been treated as the variety brooksianus of Pilosocereus royenii are considered to be Pilosocereus brooksianus (Britton & Rose) Byles & G.D.Rowley
- Populations in Mexico that have been called by this name are considered to be Pilosocereus gaumeri (Britton & Rose) Backeb.
- Pilosocereus royenii has been treated as a possible synonym of Pilosocereus polygonus (Lam.) Byles & G.D.Rowley, e.g. by Plants of the World Online.
