= Pilosocereus brooksianus =

Scientific classification
- Kingdom: Plantae
- Clade: Tracheophytes
- Clade: Angiosperms
- Clade: Eudicots
- Order: Caryophyllales
- Family: Cactaceae
- Subfamily: Cactoideae
- Genus: Pilosocereus
- Species: P. brooksianus

Binomial name
- Pilosocereus brooksianus (Britton & Rose) Byles & G.D.Rowley

Synonyms
- Cephalocereus brooksianus Britton & Rose; Cereus brooksianus (Britton & Rose) Vaupel; Pilocereus brooksianus (Britton & Rose) F.M.Knuth; Pilosocereus royenii subsp. brooksianus (Britton & Rose) Guiggi

Species of plant

Pilosocereus brooksianus is a species of flowering plant in the cactus family Cactaceae, endemic to Cuba. It was first described in 1912 by Nathaniel Lord Britton and Joseph Nelson Rose as Cephalocereus brooksianus.

== Description ==
Pilosocereus brooksianus has bluish to glaucous green stems with 8–10 ribs. It has more-or-less upright branches. The areoles have rigid spines up to 3 cm (1.2 in) long. Flowering areoles have dense tufts of silky hairs up to 5 cm (2.0 in) long; non-flowering areoles have few or no such hairs. The flower is 5–7 cm (2.0–2.8 in) long. The outer perianth segments are greenish, the inner ones white. The fruit is glaucous blue-green.

== Taxonomy ==
Pilosocereus brooksianus was first described in 1912 by Nathaniel Lord Britton and Joseph Nelson Rose as Cephalocereus brooksianus. The specific epithet brooksianus honours Theodore Brooks, the British consul in Guantánamo in the late 1800s and early 1900s. It was transferred to the genus Pilosocereus in 1957.

Some treatments of Pilosocereus in the Caribbean have used relatively few taxa, interpreting species such as P. polygonus and P. robinii broadly, with P. brooksianus as a synonym of one of these two. However, P. polygonus can be distinguished by the lack of bluish or glaucous stems and fruits and P. robinii by the absence of silky hairs.

== Distribution ==
Pilosocereus brooksianus is endemic to Cuba. It is found in southeastern Cuba, in the provinces of Guantánamo and Santiago de Cuba.
