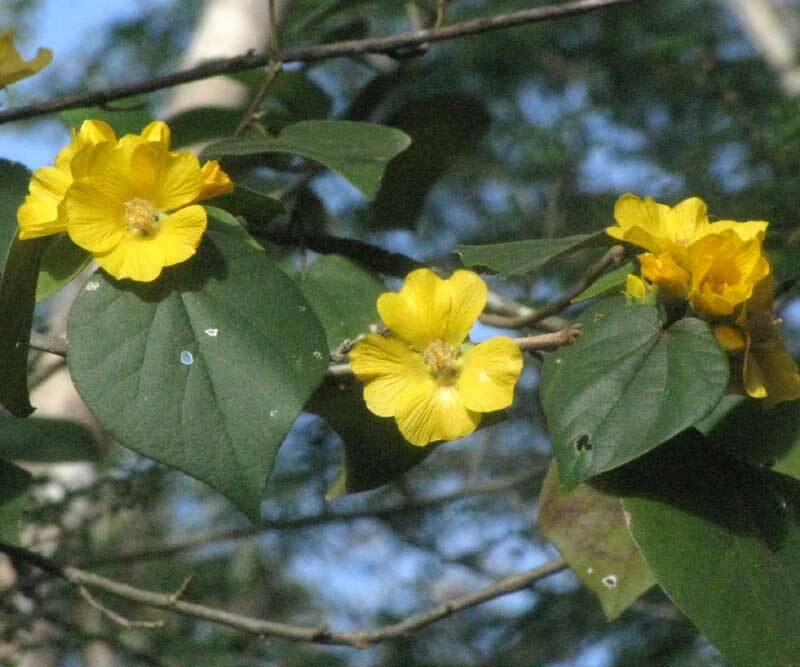
- Bakeridesia gaumeri woody, leafy, flowering stem

Scientific classification
- Kingdom: Plantae
- Clade: Embryophytes
- Clade: Tracheophytes
- Clade: Angiosperms
- Clade: Eudicots
- Clade: Rosids
- Order: Malvales
- Family: Malvaceae
- Genus: Bakeridesia
- Species: B. gaumeri

Binomial name
- Bakeridesia gaumeri (Standl.) D.M.Bates

Synonyms
- Abutilon gaumeri Standl.

= Bakeridesia gaumeri =

Species of flowering plant

Bakeridesia gaumeri, with no English name, is a species of bush or small tree native to Mexico's Yucatan Peninsula and Honduras. It belongs the family Malvaceae.

== Description ==
Here are noteworthy features of Bakeridesia gaumeri:

- Its woody stems stand up to 6.5 m (21 ft) tall. Young stems are densely covered with yellowish- to reddish-brown, "stellate"-branched hairs, or trichomes.
- Unequal and variable leaves have blades up to 15 cm (6 in) long, are broadest below their middles, and have margins bearing no teeth, lobes or indentations. About 7 primary veins radiate from the bases.
- One to up to 4 flowers on slender pedicels up to 4.5 cm (1 3/4 in) long cluster where leaves attach to stems. The bell-shaped calyces are up to 1 cm (3/8 in) long and densely covered with branched hairs. The yellow petals are up to 19 mm (3/4 in) long and nearly as wide. Sometimes flower petals are red at their bases.
- Schizocarp-type fruits develop 10 or sometimes fewer mericarp sections. Each mericarp section to a narrow, blunt projection at the top, outer edge.

== Distribution ==
Bakeridesia gaumeri is native to southeastern Mexico's Yucatan Peninsula, with a disjunct population in Honduras.

== Habitat ==
Bakeridesia gaumeri occurs in various types of Yucatán dry forests and sometimes in secondary vegetation.

== Phenology ==
Bakeridesia gaumeri flowers and fruits sporadically throughout the year but may peak around June.

== Human uses ==
Among the Mayan people of Mexico's Yucatan Peninsula, Bakeridesia gaumeri is considered medicinal, a source of material for textiles, and its flowers are important for honey production.

The textile function probably relates to the use of the strong phloem fibers for which some members of the Malvaceae are famous. Jute derived from the genus Corchorus may be the best known example of such use. The fibers of Bakeridesia gaumeri traditionally have been used by the Maya for making tumplines called mecapales, for carrying burdens on the back. Also, the fibers are used for tying together tamilitos, a small variation of the tamale.

=== Traditional medicine ===
Bakeridesia gaumeri is used in traditional medicine for the treatment of dysentery, enterocolitis and diarrhea. Modern studies demonstrate that stem extracts show significant antioxidant activity.

=== Landscaping ===
A study of home gardens in tropical Mexico found Bakeridesia gaumeri to be present. Bakeridesia gaumeri is encouraged for landscaping because of its "... attractive, bell-shaped yellow to orange flowers that are visited by bees and butterflies and performs well as an understory or hedge plant in warm climates."

== Taxonomy ==
In 1930 when Paul Carpenter Standley formally described Bakeridesia gaumeri under the name Abutilon gaumeri, he noted that his type specimen had been collected by G.F. Gaumer in the Yucatan.

In his 1973 Revision of Bakeridesia, David Martin Bates writes that in terms of physical features Bakeridesia gaumeri belongs to the section Minores of its subgenus, and that its corolla, calyx and staminal column all are unusually small, plus the number of carpels, ten or fewer, is unusually few for this group. Also, the carpels' "beak" demonstrates a complete or nearly complete loss of winglike projections; in terms of its section, it "... stands at the end of a floral reduction series."

=== Etymology ===
The genus name Bakeridesia was coined in 1913 by Bénédict Pierre Georges Hochreutiner in honor of Edmund Gilbert Baker. Both published important works dealing with the Malvaceae.

The species name gaumeri honors George Franklin Gaumer, who collected the type specimen from which the taxon was described.

== Gallery ==
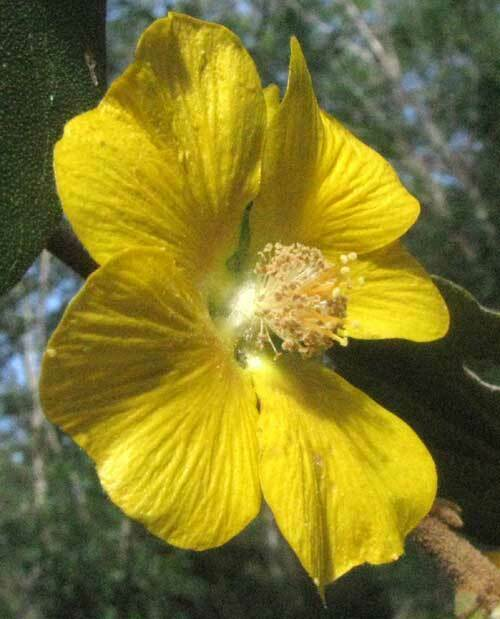
Flower

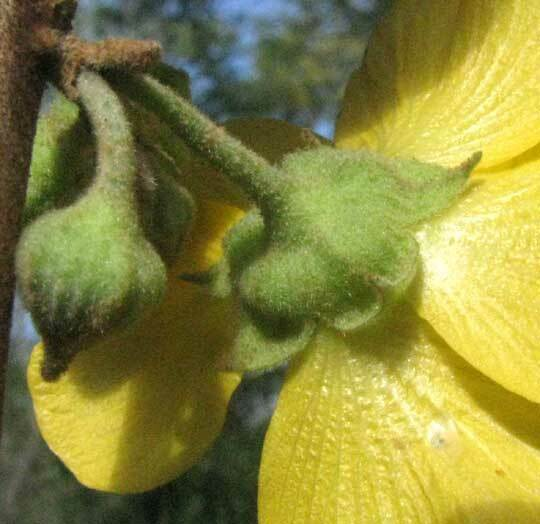
Hairy pedicel and calyx

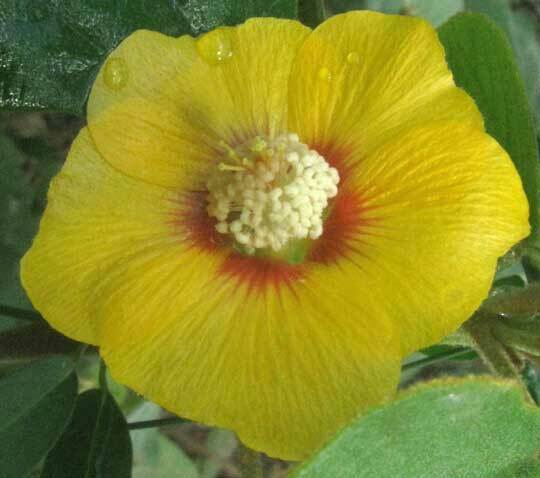
Petals with red bases

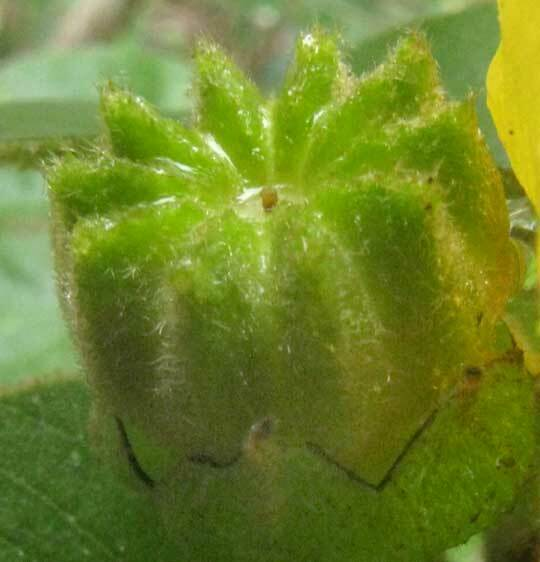
Schizocarp with ten sections
