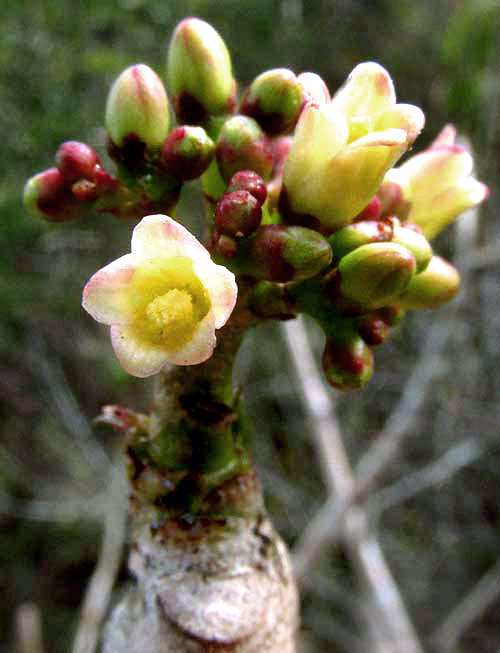
- Male flowers

Scientific classification
- Kingdom: Plantae
- Clade: Embryophytes
- Clade: Tracheophytes
- Clade: Spermatophytes
- Clade: Angiosperms
- Clade: Eudicots
- Clade: Rosids
- Order: Malpighiales
- Family: Euphorbiaceae
- Genus: Jatropha
- Species: J. gaumeri

Binomial name
- Jatropha gaumeri Greenm.

= Jatropha gaumeri =

Species of plant

Jatropha gaumeri, with no commonly used English name, is a shrub or small tree native to tropical Mexico and contiguous Central America. It belongs to the family Euphorbiaceae.

== Discription ==
Jatropha gaumeri is a shrub or small tree growing up to 10 m (33 ft) tall. It displays these noteworthy features:

- It tends to be shrubby in scrublands, sandy coastal areas and on heavy clay soil, and to grow into trees elsewhere. Its gray-green stems are much branched, thick, fleshy and pliable, and when injured issue a copious, pale, cloudy latex.
- Leaves are semi-evergreen with broad, somewhat leathery blades on petioles up to 12.5 cm (5 in) long. Blades are heart-shaped with 7 primary veins radiating from the base, rarely shallowly 3-lobed, usually up to about 12.5 cm (5 in) long, and a little broader than long. Occasionally leaf base margins develop 1 or 2 short-stemmed glands.
- Much-branched, panicle-type Inflorescences develop before new leaves appear, their peduncles reaching up to 3 cm (1 1/8 in) long.
- Flowers are either male or female, and both sexes occur on the same tree. The two sexes' general appearance and size is similar (petals of both around 6 mm (1/4 in) long) but male flowers have 8 stamens, while females have an ovary with 3 styles about 1.5 mm (1/16 in) long.
- Fruits are spherical capsules up to 2 cm (3/4 in) across, with 6 conspicuous ribs. When mature the capsule "explosively" snaps apart, releasing oval seeds which are brown with darker brown mottling, and up to 1.5 cm (5/8 in) cm long. Each seed bears a small but prominent caruncle.

== Distribution ==
In Mexico, Jatropha gaumeri occurs in the southern states of Campeche, Chiapas, Oaxaca and Tabasco, and throughout the Yucatan Peninsula, as well as in Belize and Guatemala.

== Habitat ==
In Mexico's Yucatan Peninsula, Jatropha gaumeri inhabits low- and medium-height forests with trees bearig deciduous or semi-deciduous leaves, including forests with columnar cacti, as well as disturbed areas such as roadsides and weedy fields. In Mexico the species is restricted to areas lower than 200 m (660 ft) above sea level.

== Human uses ==
=== Traditional medicine ===
Among the Mayan people in Mexico's Yucatan Peninsula, Jatropha gaumeri is one of the most frequently used plants in traditional medicine. When cut, the tree exudes a milky latex used to alleviate skin rashes, mouth blisters, fever and bone fractures. In fact, studies show that extracts from roots and leaves demonstrate antimicrobial and antioxidant activity. A study with mice found that latex from cut stalks and leaves showed a wound healing efficacy of 97%.

=== For making whistles ===
Traditionally the Mayan people took advantage of the thick stems of Jatropha gaumeri to make whistles, which they called chul.

== Taxonomy ==
In 1907, Jatropha gaumeri was named and described by Jesse More Greenman. The species has no recognized synonyms.

=== Etymology ===
The genus name Jatropha derives from the Greek iatros meaning "physician," and trophē meaning "nourishment." This relates to the medicinal features of various Jatropha species.

The species name gaumeri honors George Franklin Gaumer, a physician and prolific collector of plants and animals in Mexico's Yucatan Peninsula. When in 1907 Jesse More Greenman named and described Jatropha gaumeri, he referenced plants collected by Gaumer in his description.

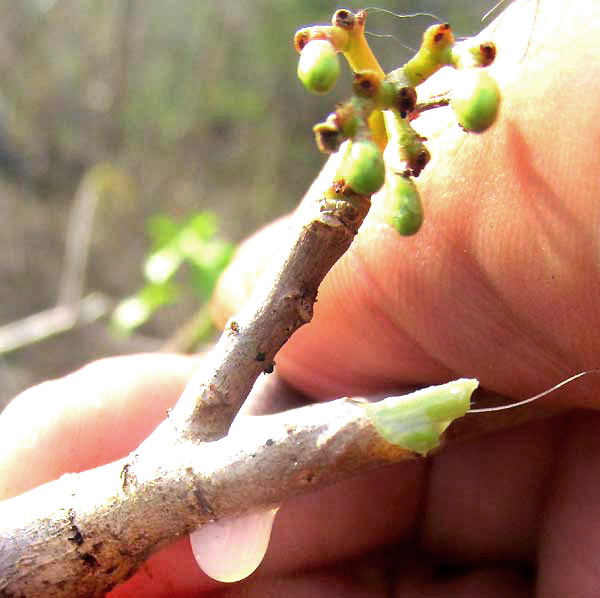
cloudy latex issuing from a broken stem

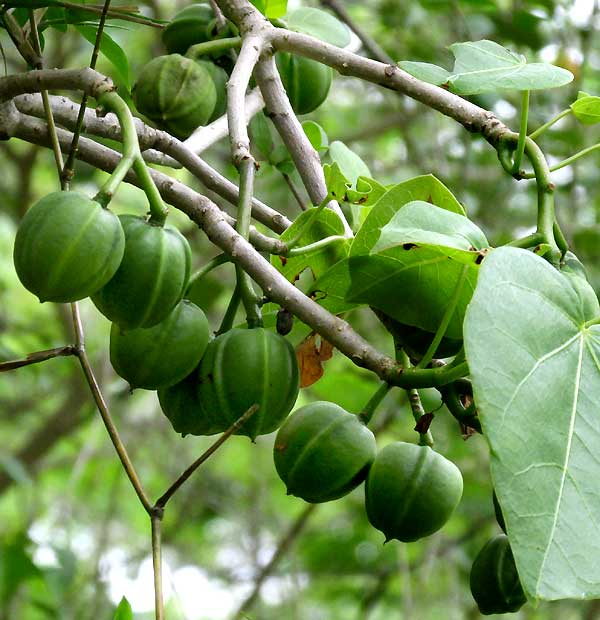
immature capsular fruits

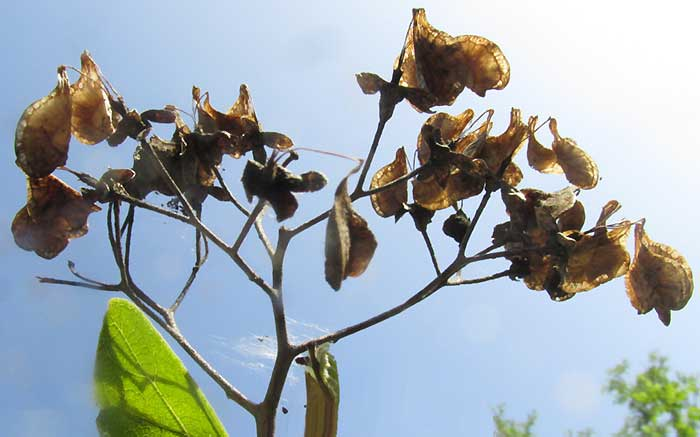
remains of capsules after explosive seed dispersal

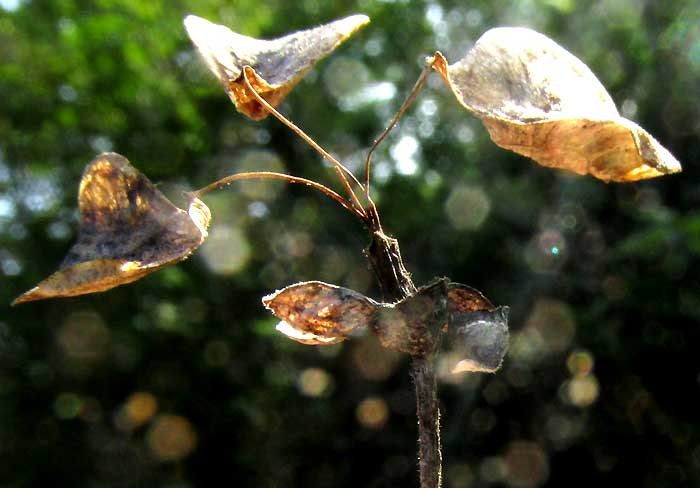
close-up of capsule remains

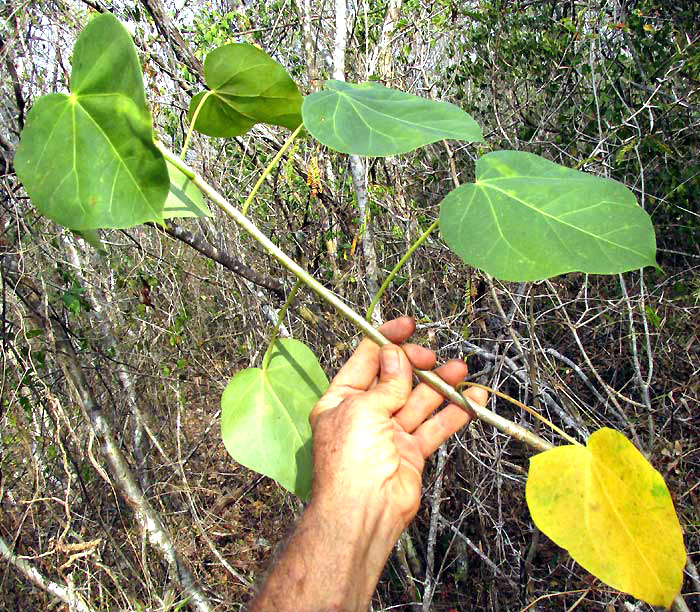
heart-shaped leaves

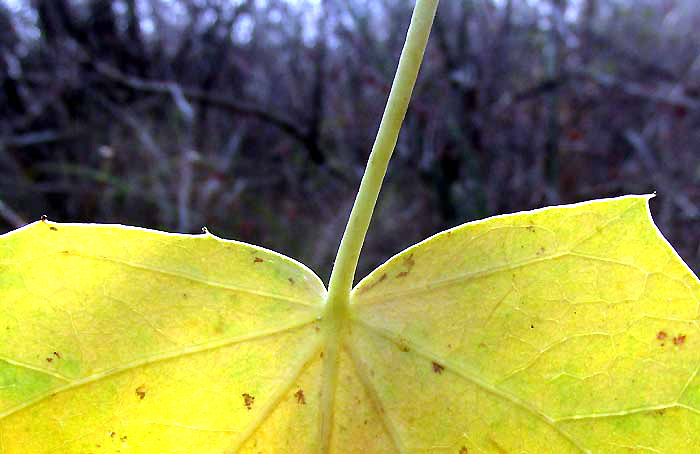
leaf base with 2 short-stalked glands

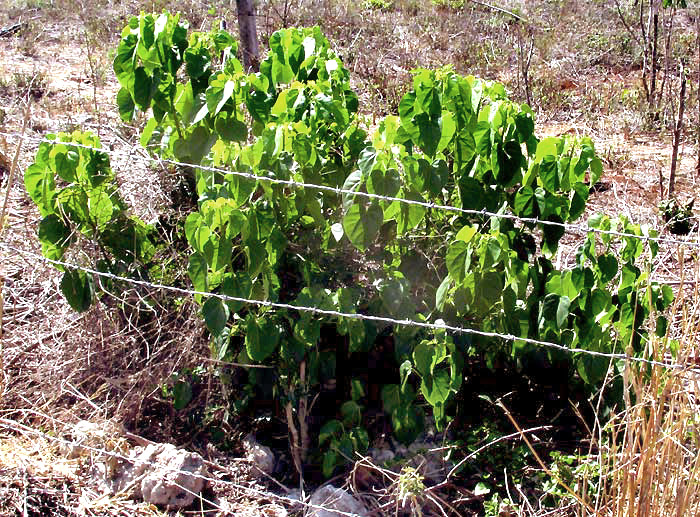
young, bushy shrub

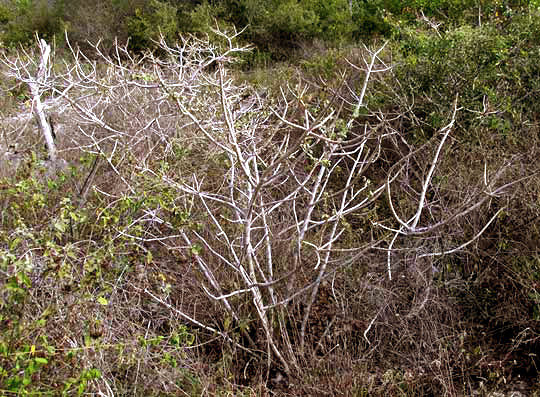
leafless state as first flowers begin appearing
