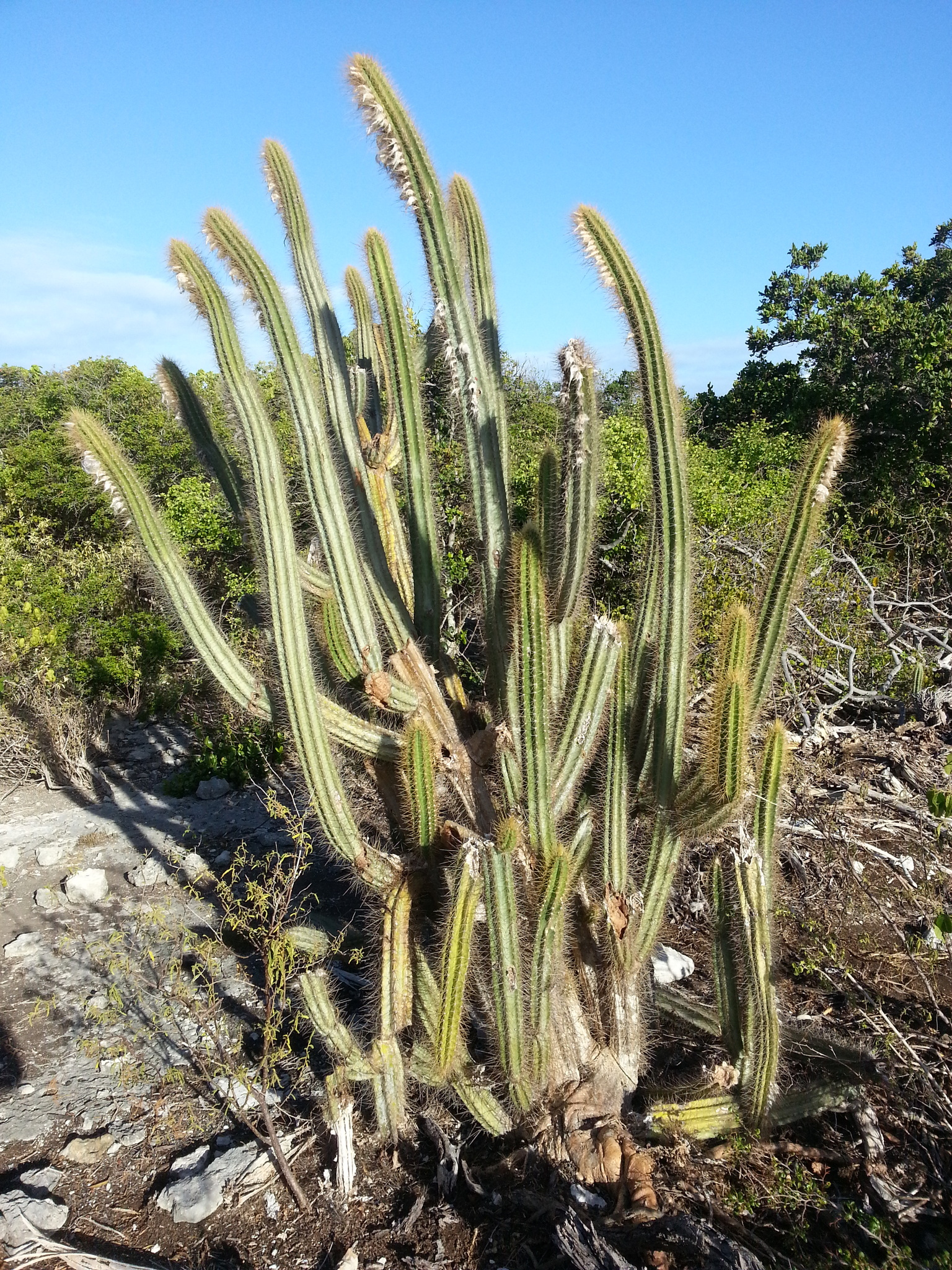
- In Anegada, British Virgin Islands

Scientific classification
- Kingdom: Plantae
- Clade: Tracheophytes
- Clade: Angiosperms
- Clade: Eudicots
- Order: Caryophyllales
- Family: Cactaceae
- Subfamily: Cactoideae
- Genus: Pilosocereus
- Species: P. curtisii

Binomial name
- Pilosocereus curtisii (Otto) A.R.Frank

Synonyms
- Cephalocereus barbadensis Britton & Rose; Cephalocereus nobilis var. curtisii (Pfeiff.) Borg; Cephalocereus urbanianus (K.Schum.) Britton & Rose; Cereus curtisii Otto; Cereus urbanianus (K.Schum.) A.Berger; Pilocereus curtisii (Pfeiff.) Salm-Dyck; Pilocereus urbanianus K.Schum.; Pilosocereus barbadensis (Britton & Rose) Byles & G.D.Rowley; Pilosocereus polygonus subsp. curtisii (Otto) Guiggi; Pilosocereus urbanianus (K.Schum.) Byles & G.D.Rowley

= Pilosocereus curtisii =

Species of cactus

Pilosocereus curtisii is a species of cactus (family Cactaceae) found in the Leeward Islands and the Windward Islands.

== Description ==
Pilosocereus curtisii has green stems, sometimes slightly glaucous, with 7–12 ribs. Its branches are often strictly upright. The areoles have spines up to 7 cm (2.8 in) long. Flowering areoles have dense tufts of silky hairs up to 6 cm (2.4 in) long. Non-flowering areoles have few or no such hairs. The flower is 5–7 cm (2.0–2.8 in). The outer segments (tepals) are pinkish to light green, sometimes slightly glaucous. The inner segments are white to pink. The fruit is red.

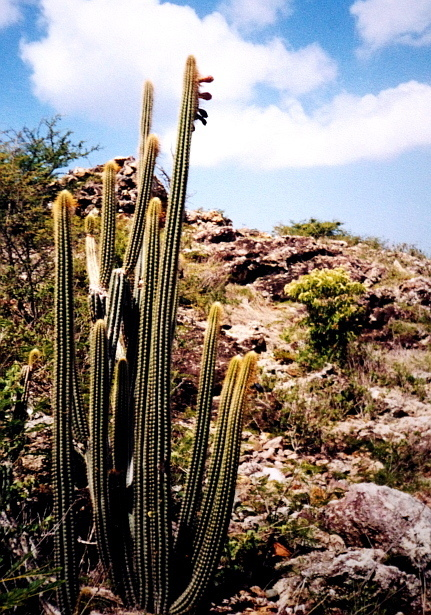
In Antigua

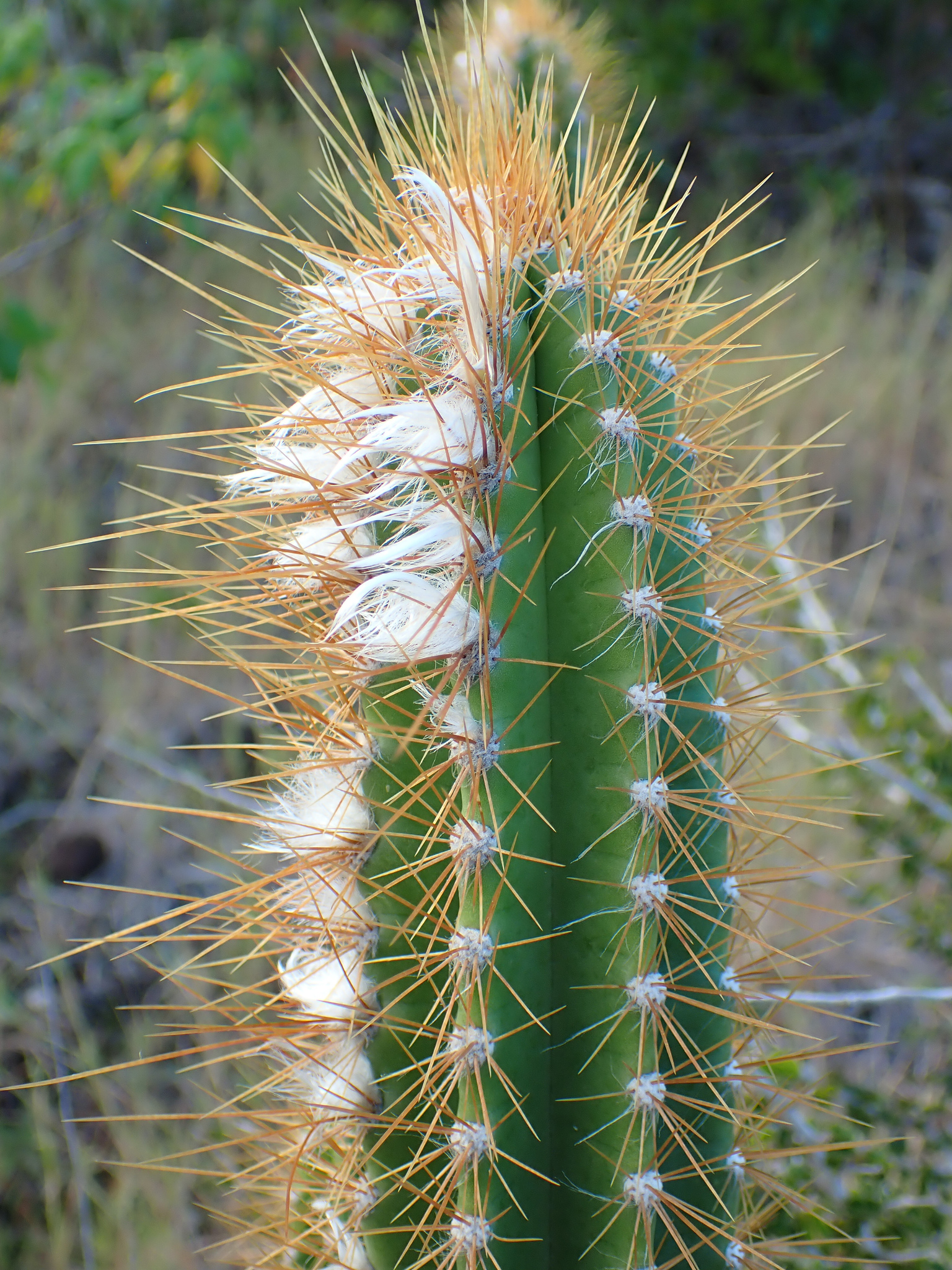
In Bequia, showing tufts of silky hairs

== Taxonomy ==
The species was first described by Christoph Friedrich Otto in 1833 as Cereus curtisii. The combination Pilosocereus curtisii was first published in 2019.

Some authors have recognized only one species, Pilosocereus royenii (a synonym of Pilosocereus armatus as of June 2025), native from Puerto Rico south to Grenada and Barbados. Alternatively, P. armatus may be used for plants found in Puerto Rico and most of the Virgin Islands, with P. curtisii native to Anegada in the northeastern corner of the Virgin Islands and southwards to Grenada. P. curtisii is distinguished by having green rather than bluish stems and longer radial spines. In 2020, Alessandro Guiggi accepted the distinctiveness of this taxon, but preferred to treat it as a subspecies of a very broadly defined P. polygonus, P. polygonus subsp. curtisii.

== Distribution ==
Pilosocereus curtisii is native to Anegada in the British Virgin Islands (in the north of the Leeward Islands) and to the Lesser Antilles when this is defined as the part of the Leeward and Windward Islands running from Sombrero south to Grenada.
