= Bakeridesia =

Scientific classification
- Kingdom: Plantae
- Clade: Tracheophytes
- Clade: Angiosperms
- Clade: Eudicots
- Clade: Rosids
- Order: Malvales
- Family: Malvaceae
- Genus: Bakeridesia; Hochr.

Genus of flowering plants

Bakeridesia is a genus of flowering plants belonging to the family Malvaceae.

Its native range is Mexico to Venezuela, Eastern Brazil.

Species:

- Bakeridesia amoena Fryxell
- Bakeridesia bakeriana (Rose) D.M.Bates
- Bakeridesia chittendenii (Standl.) Donnell
- Bakeridesia esculenta (A.St.-Hil.) Monteiro
- Bakeridesia exalata D.M.Bates
- Bakeridesia ferruginea (Martyn) Krapov.
- Bakeridesia gaumeri (Standl.) D.M.Bates
- Bakeridesia gloriosa D.M.Bates
- Bakeridesia guerrerensis Donnell
- Bakeridesia huastecana Donnell
- Bakeridesia integerrima (Hook.) D.M.Bates
- Bakeridesia jaliscana Donnell
- Bakeridesia molinae D.M.Bates
- Bakeridesia nelsonii (Rose) D.M.Bates
- Bakeridesia notolophium (A.Gray) Hochr.
- Bakeridesia parvifolia Donnell
- Bakeridesia pittieri (Donn.Sm.) D.M.Bates
- Bakeridesia vulcanicola (Standl.) D.M.Bates
- Bakeridesia yucatana (Standl.) D.M.Bates
- Bakeridesia zapoteca Donnell
