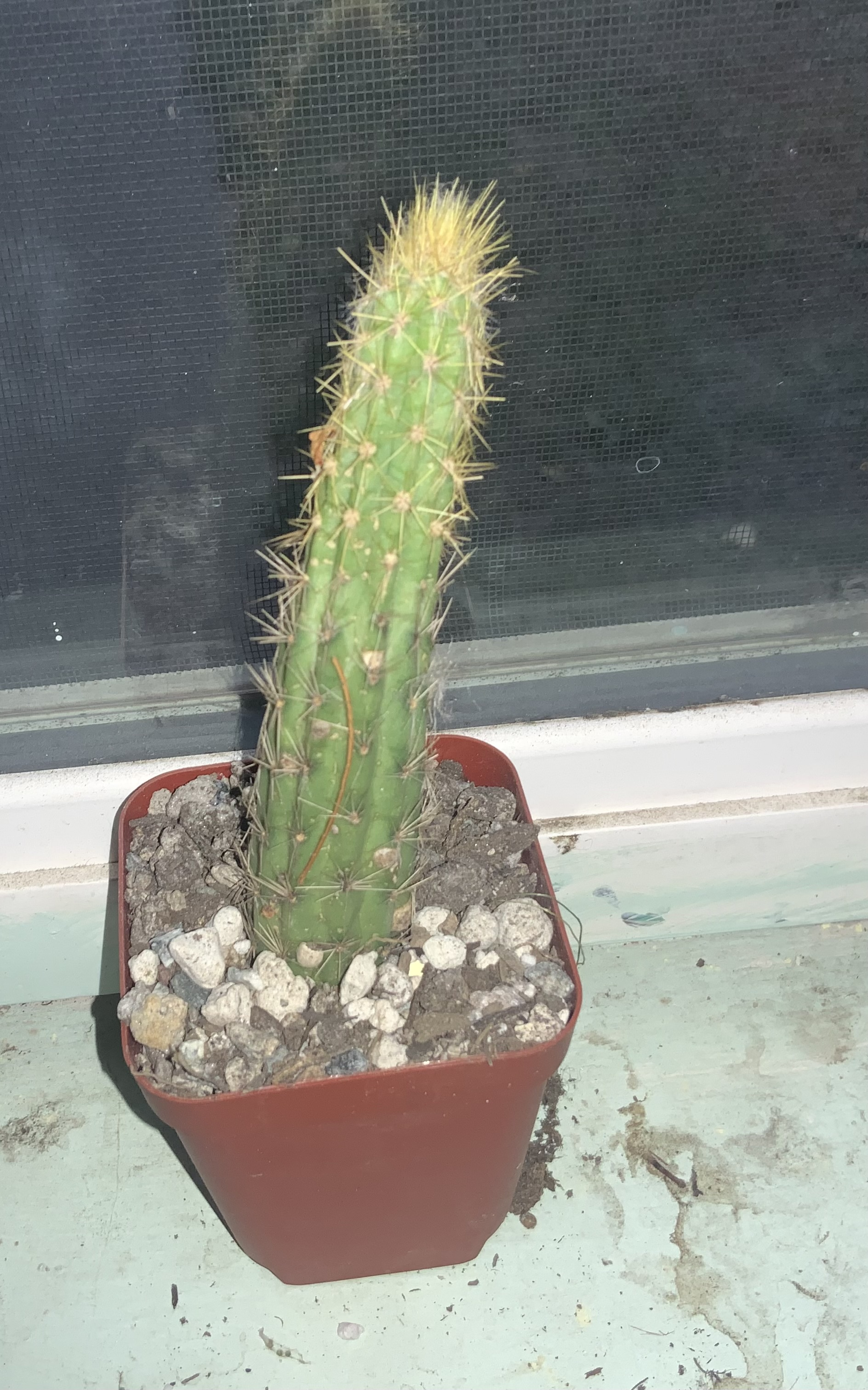

Scientific classification
- Kingdom: Plantae
- Clade: Tracheophytes
- Clade: Angiosperms
- Clade: Eudicots
- Order: Caryophyllales
- Family: Cactaceae
- Subfamily: Cactoideae
- Genus: Pilosocereus
- Species: P. gaumeri

Binomial name
- Pilosocereus gaumeri (Britton & Rose) Backeb.

= Pilosocereus gaumeri =

Species of cactus

Pilosocereus gaumeri is a species of columnar cactus endemic to the Yucatán Peninsula of Mexico. Its common name in Spanish is sabucán.

== Description ==
Pilosocereus gaumeri is a slender-growing branching cactus up to about 2.4 m (8 ft) tall. It has green to yellowish green stems with 8–13 ribs. The areoles are about 5 mm (0.2 in) across and have up to 15 rigid spines. The spines are up to 5 cm (2.0 in) long and yellow to brown when fresh. Flowering areoles have dense tufts of silky hairs up to 5 cm (2.0 in) long. Non-flowering areoles have few or no silky hairs. The flowers are 5–7 cm (2.0–2.8 in) long, occasionally up to 8 cm (3.1 in) long. The outer segments (tepals) are reddish green. The inner segments are white to yellowish green. The flowers last for one night. The fruits have purple pulp when ripe.

== Taxonomy ==
The species was first described by Nathaniel Lord Britton and Joseph Nelson Rose in 1920 as Cephalocereus gaumeri. In 1960, Curt Backeberg transferred it to the genus Pilosocereus. The epiphet gaumeri refers to the American botanist George Franklin Gaumer (1850-1929). Pilosocereus gaumeri has been treated under the incorrect name Pilosocereus royenii. It has also been considered to be a subspecies of Pilosocereus polygonus, P. polygonus subsp. gaumeri.

== Distribution ==
Pilosocereus gaumeri is endemic to the Yucatán Peninsula of Mexico, in particular the states of Campeche and Yucatán. It is the only Pilosocereus species found in this region.

== Ecology ==
Pilosocereus gaumeri is often found growing with Opuntia inaperta. The cactus stems also serve as a nesting site for wrens.
