= Pilosocereus brevispinus =

Scientific classification
- Kingdom: Plantae
- Clade: Tracheophytes
- Clade: Angiosperms
- Clade: Eudicots
- Order: Caryophyllales
- Family: Cactaceae
- Subfamily: Cactoideae
- Genus: Pilosocereus
- Species: P. brevispinus

Binomial name
- Pilosocereus brevispinus Hoxey & Gdaniec

Synonyms
- Pilosocereus polygonus subsp. brevispinus (Hoxey & Gdaniec) Guiggi

Species of cactus

Pilosocereus brevispinus is a species of flowering plant in the cactus family Cactaceae, native to central Hispaniola, occurring in both the Dominican Republic and Haiti. It was first described in 2021, when it was separated from Pilosocereus polygonus. It has also been treated as a subspecies of Pilosocereus polygonus, P. polygonus subsp. brevispinus.

== Description ==
Plants of Pilosocereus brevispinus have a tree-like habit, reaching 5 m (16 ft) in height when mature, with a woody trunk up to 1 m (3 ft) high and upright branches. The green or greyish green stems are 6–8 cm (2–3 in) across with 9–11 ribs. The areoles are about 3 mm (0.1 in) across and about 10 mm (0.4 in) apart. Flowering areoles have a dense tuft of white hairs 3–4 cm (1.2–1.6 in) long; non-flowering areoles have shorter hairs that may be lost with age. Both kinds of areole have 15–20 straight spines, generally 4–6 mm (0.16–0.24 in) long.

The flowers appear at night and have a smell described as "musty". Excluding the style, they are about 70 mm (2.8 in) long and about 45 mm (1.8 in) across. The white style is 55 mm (2.2 in) long. The outer perianth segments are rounded and fleshy, about 10 mm (0.4 in) long and wide. There are about 16 white inner perianth segments that are about 15 mm (0.6 in) long and 8 mm (0.3 in) wide. The fruit is spherical, about 40 mm (1.6 in) across, with red pulp and shiny black seeds.

== Taxonomy ==
Pilosocereus brevispinus was first described in 2021. The specific epithet brevispinus refers to the shortness of the spines. Previously, all the species of Pilosocereus found on the island of Hispaniola were treated as Pilosocereus polygonus. P. brevispinus is distinguished from P. polygonus by generally having a smaller number of spines per areole (12–20 rather than 20-30) that are distinctly shorter (up to 8 mm (0.3 in) long rather than 15–30 mm (0.6–1.2 in)). It also has a longer tuft of hairs in flowering areoles than P. polygonus. P. brevispinus has also been considered not to be sufficiently different from P. polygonus to justify treating it as a distinct species, and hence accepted as a subspecies, P. polygonus subsp. brevispinus.

== Distribution and habitat ==
Pilosocereus brevispinus is endemic to the island of Hispaniola. It is found in the centre of the island, in both Haiti and the Dominican Republic, at elevations of 300–500 m (1,000–1,600 ft). Larger specimens are found in open habitats, smaller ones in forests.
