= Pilosocereus jamaicensis =

Scientific classification
- Kingdom: Plantae
- Clade: Tracheophytes
- Clade: Angiosperms
- Clade: Eudicots
- Order: Caryophyllales
- Family: Cactaceae
- Subfamily: Cactoideae
- Genus: Pilosocereus
- Species: P. jamaicensis

Binomial name
- Pilosocereus jamaicensis Proctor

Synonyms
- Cephalocereus swartzii sensu Britton & Rose (1909) non Grisebach (1860); Pilosocereus polygonus subsp. jamaicensis (Proctor) Guiggi

Species of cactus

Pilosocereus jamaicensis is a species of flowering plant in the cactus family Cactaceae, native to the Cayman Islands and Jamaica. It was first described in 2019. It has also been treated as a subspecies of Pilosocereus polygonus, P. polygonus subsp. jamaicensis.

== Description ==
Pilosocereus jamaicensis has greyish stems, from glaucous grey to glaucous green, with 9–16 ribs. Its branches are usually upright. The areoles have rigid spines up to 5 cm (2.0 in) long. Flowering areoles have silky hairs up to 2 cm (0.8 in) long in dense tufts. Non-flowering areoles lack these hairs. The flowers are 5–7 cm (2.0–2.8 in) long, with green or pinkish green outer segments (tepals) and white inner segments. The fruit is red.

== Taxonomy ==
The Pilosocereus species native to the Cayman Islands and Jamaica had long been named using the specific epithet swartzii, based on Cereus swartzii. However, such names are synonyms of Stenocereus fimbriatus, itself a synonym of Stenocereus heptagonus. When it was realized in 2019 that the use of swartzii was incorrect, a new name was needed for the Cayman Islands and Jamaican species. George R. Proctor had used the unpublished name "Cephalocereus jamaicensis" for a herbarium specimen from northern Jamaica collected in 1955, so this epithet was published in 2019 to replace the incorrect use of swartzii. In 2020, Alessandro Guiggi accepted the distinctiveness of this taxon, but preferred to treat it as a subspecies of a very broadly defined P. polygonus, P. polygonus subsp. jamaicensis.

== Distribution ==
Pilosocereus jamaicensis is native to the Cayman Islands and Jamaica. It has been suggested that plants found in the Cayman Islands may be a distinct species; those from western Cayman Brac and Little Cayman appear to have lost their silky hairs by the time flowers and fruits mature, whereas those from eastern Cayman Brac have not. In Jamaica, populations are found on the northern and southern coasts as well as in the centre.
