= Scutellaria gaumeri =

- Scutellaria gaumeri flowers densely covered with gland-tipped trichomes

Scientific classification
- Kingdom: Plantae
- Clade: Tracheophytes
- Clade: Angiosperms
- Clade: Eudicots
- Clade: Asterids
- Order: Lamiales
- Family: Lamiaceae
- Genus: Scutellaria
- Species: S. gaumeri

Binomial name
- Scutellaria gaumeri Leonard

Synonyms
- Scutellaria petenensis Lundell

Species of flowering plant

Beside weedy traditional Mayan cornfield

Scutellaria gaumeri, with no commonly used English name -- though all Scutellaria species can be called skullcaps -- is a herbaceous plant which grows as a perennial. Native to southern Mexico and northern Central America, it belongs to the family Lamiaceae.

== Description ==
These key features distinguish Scutellaria gaumeri from many similar species:

- Several branching stems reaching up to 60 cm (24 in) tall bear leaves and other green parts usually variously covered with upright hairs, or trichomes, up to 1.1 mm (1/32 in) tall; many hairs are tipped with glands. Sometimes green parts are hairless, and glands may not be present in certain parts. Stems are squared in cross-section.
- Leaves are up to 3 cm (1 1/8 in) long and 2 cm (3/4 in) wide. On petioles up to 1 cm (3/8 in) long, the blades are broadest below their middles and have scalloped, or crenate, margins.
- Raceme-type inflorescences up to 15 cm (6 in) tall grow at stem tips and where leaves attach to the stems. Flowers attach opposite one another on the inflorescence's rachises but when fully open the pedicels bend so that the two corollas are positioned beside one another and facing in the same direction. Calyces bear on their upper sides a conspicuous cap-like projection, the "scutellum," up to 5 mm (3/16 in) high. The corolla is blue to purple, possibly sometimes white. It is strongly two-lipped, the corolla tube with its extended upper lip, the "galea," reaching up to 13.5 mm (9/16 in) long. The corolla tube emerging from the calyx is markedly up-curved.
- Fruits are schizocarps which split into 4 tiny, black "nutlets" covered with bumps, or "papillae."

== Distribution ==
In Mexico's Yucatan Peninsula, Scutellaria gaumeri occurs in the states of Campeche, Quintana Roo and Yucatán. In Central America it is found in Guatemala and Honduras.

== Habitat ==
In Mexico's Yucatan Peninsula, Scutellaria gaumeri is found in dry forest and moist forest with lengthy dry seasons, and disturbed, weedy areas.

== Pollinators ==
Although in general hummingbirds are most attracted by red flowers, the blue-flowered Scutellaria gaumeri is known to be pollinated by the Cozumel emerald hummingbird. Scutellaria species can attract both bees and hummingbirds.

== Raindrop seed dispersal mechanism ==
The conspicuous appendage atop the calyx is somewhat scoop-shaped – concave on the back side. Such scoop-shaped appendages in other Scutellaria species have been observed facilitating seed dispersal. After the corolla falls off and the fruit matures into 4 nutlets, the calyx nods earthward, and when a raindrop splashes into the appendage's depression, it shakes the calyx so violently that the nutlets may be catapulted from the plant. Then rainwater may wash the nutlets a distance from the plant.

== Uses by humans ==
=== In traditional medicine ===
In Mexico's Yucatan Peninsula, Scutellaria gaumeri has been used medicinally to relieve back pain, and as a tonic.

=== In gardening ===
In family gardens in Mexico's state of Yucatán, Scutellaria gaumeri sometimes is recognized as an ornamental.

== Taxonomy ==
In 1927, Emery Clarence Leonard formally described and named Scutellaria gaumeri, noting that his type specimen had been collected in 1895 by G. F. Gaumer at Pocoboch, Yucatán, Mexico, his #2392. He also noted the species' similarity to Scutellaria guatemalensis and Scutellaria seleriana.

=== Phylogeny ===
In 2026, DNA sequencing on Scutellaria gaumeri had not been accomplished. However, in 2024, a phylogenetic analysis based on 234 complete chloroplast genomes of about 500 Scutellaria species occurring worldwide found that, of the genus's six sections, the Mexican species Scutellaria seleriana belongs to tropical American Scutellaria section, clade 5. Since Scutellaria seleriana is similar to Scutellaria gaumeri and with the two species' distribution areas largely overlapping, a good bet is that Scutellaria gaumeri similarly occupies a phylogenetic position in the authors' Scutellaria section, clade 5.

== Etymology ==
The genus name Scutellaria comes from the Latin word scutella meaning "small dish, small saucer." This refers to the shape of the species' calyces, which persist through the seed dispersal period.

The species name gaumeri honors George Franklin Gaumer who collected the plants from which Emery Clarence Leonard described and named the species.
