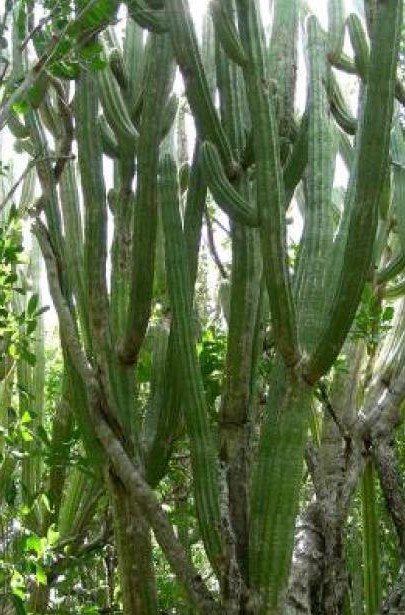

Conservation status
- Critically Imperiled (NatureServe)

Scientific classification
- Kingdom: Plantae
- Clade: Tracheophytes
- Clade: Angiosperms
- Clade: Eudicots
- Order: Caryophyllales
- Family: Cactaceae
- Subfamily: Cactoideae
- Genus: Pilosocereus
- Species: P. robinii

Binomial name
- Pilosocereus robinii (Lem.) Byles & G.D.Rowley

Synonyms
- Cephalocereus bahamensis Britton & Rose; Cephalocereus bakeri Britton & Rose; Cephalocereus deeringii Small; Cephalocereus keyensis Britton & Rose; Cephalocereus robinii (Lem.) Britton & Rose; Cereus bahamensis (Britton & Rose) Vaupel; Cereus bakeri (Britton & Rose) Vaupel; Cereus keyensis (Britton & Rose) Vaupel; Cereus robinii (Lem.) L.D.Benson; Pilocereus bahamensis (Britton & Rose) F.M.Knuth; Pilocereus deeringii (Small) F.M.Knuth; Pilocereus keyensis (Britton & Rose) F.M.Knuth; Pilocereus robinii Lem.; Pilosocereus bahamensis (Britton & Rose) Byles & G.D.Rowley; Pilosocereus deeringii (Small) Byles & G.D.Rowley; Pilosocereus keyensis (Britton & Rose) Byles & G.D.Rowley; Pilosocereus robinii subsp. keyensis (Britton & Rose) Guiggi

= Pilosocereus robinii =

Species of cactus

Pilosocereus robinii is a species of cactus known by the common name Key tree-cactus. It is native to the Florida Keys in the United States, northwestern Cuba, and the north of The Bahamas. It has been erroneously reported from Puerto Rico, the Virgin Islands, and Mexico.

== Description ==
Pilosocereus robinii is a large cactus growing erect, often with many parallel or spreading branches. It may become a tree up to 10 m (33 ft) tall. The stem is green in color with a blue tinge when young and has 9 to 13 ribs. The areoles are covered in long or short hairs and have up to 31 spines each. The spines are no more than a centimeter long. The bell-shaped flower is 5–6 cm (2.0–2.4 in) long. The outer tepals are greenish with brownish midstripes and the inner tepals are white. The flower has a scent similar to garlic. It opens at night and contains a sweet nectar.

== Taxonomy ==
The species was first described by Charles Lemaire in 1864 as Pilocereus robinii. However, Pilocereus is an illegitimate genus name, and was replaced by Pilosocereus in 1957, when the name Pilosocereus robinii was also published. It was formerly included in Pilosocereus polygonus. Pilocereus robinii is distinguished from other species of Pilosocereus by the absence of silky hairs on its areoles. P. deeringii and P. keyensis, both described from Florida, and P. bahamensis, described from The Bahamas, appear to fall within the range of variation of P. robinii, and are treated as synonyms.

== Distribution and habitat ==
Pilosocereus robinii is native to the north of The Bahamas (Andros and Cat Island north to Abaco), northwestern Cuba (the provinces of La Habana, Matanzas, and Mayabeque), and the United States (the Florida Keys). It is the only Pilosocereus species native to the United States.

In the Florida Keys, P. robinii grows in upland tropical hardwood hammocks on limestone or coral substrates. It sometimes grows on sparsely vegetated coral rock and just above the high tide mark. Few of these plants produce fruits. Their seeds are dispersed by frugivores. Windy conditions also spread the seeds and can also break off branches which can root themselves in the soil. Storm surges and sea level rise may inundate its shoreline habitat and increase the salinity beyond the tolerable range for the cactus.

== Conservation ==
Threats to the species include the destruction of its habitat during development. In the US, populations on the Upper and Lower Matecumbe Keys have been mostly eliminated due to residential development. Development also leads to habitat fragmentation. Hurricanes are a threat to the cactus because the winds can break cactus branches or bring down taller vegetation, causing injury; however, hurricane action may open the canopy, providing sunlight to the cactus, which may be beneficial. As of 2009, there were only seven known populations of this plant in Florida, located on four of the Florida Keys.
