= Scutellaria holguinensis =

Scientific classification
- Kingdom: Plantae
- Clade: Tracheophytes
- Clade: Angiosperms
- Clade: Eudicots
- Clade: Asterids
- Order: Lamiales
- Family: Lamiaceae
- Genus: Scutellaria
- Species: S. holguinensis

Binomial name
- Scutellaria holguinensis I.E.Méndez

Species of plant in the mint family

Scutellaria holguinensis is a species of flowering plant in the family Lamiaceae, native to Cuba. It is found on serpentine soils in Holguín Province, northeastern Cuba.
