= Scutellaria tuvensis =

Scientific classification
- Kingdom: Plantae
- Clade: Embryophytes
- Clade: Tracheophytes
- Clade: Spermatophytes
- Clade: Angiosperms
- Clade: Eudicots
- Clade: Asterids
- Order: Lamiales
- Family: Lamiaceae
- Genus: Scutellaria
- Species: S. tuvensis

Binomial name
- Scutellaria tuvensis Juz.

Species of plant

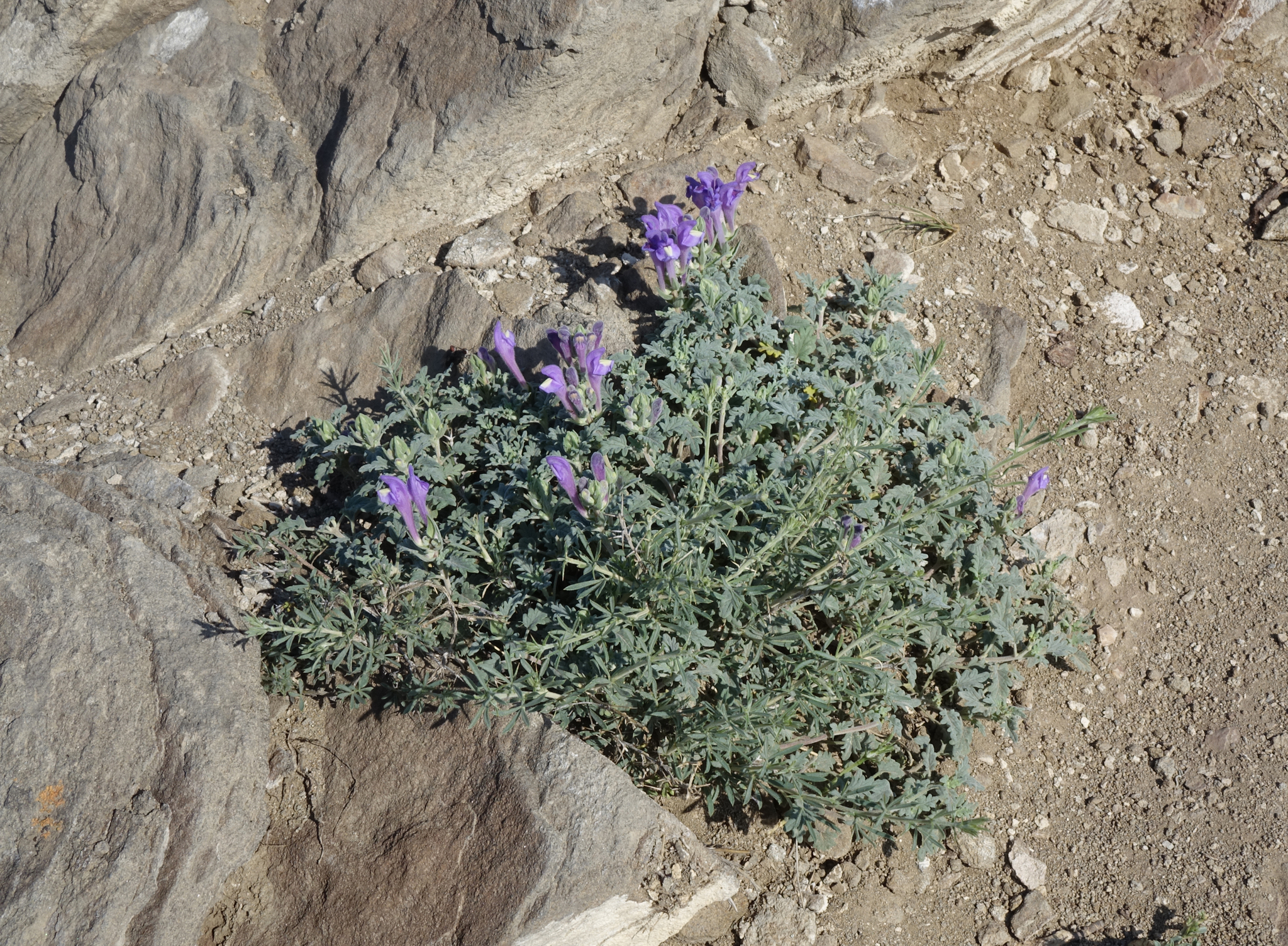
Scutellaria tuvensis

Scutellaria tuvensis is a species of flowering plant in the family Lamiaceae, native to Tuva in southern Siberia. A perennial, it is found in dry and desert steppes on thin soils, gravel, scree, and rocky outcrops.
