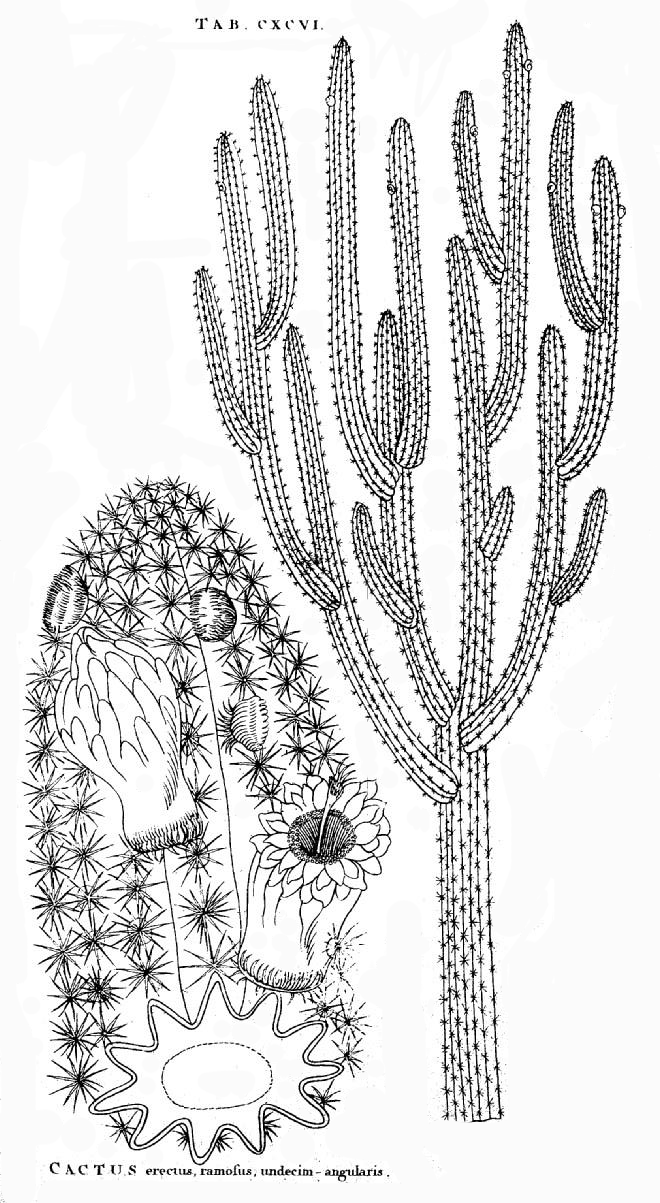
- Botanical illustration – the lectotype

Scientific classification
- Kingdom: Plantae
- Clade: Tracheophytes
- Clade: Angiosperms
- Clade: Eudicots
- Order: Caryophyllales
- Family: Cactaceae
- Subfamily: Cactoideae
- Genus: Pilosocereus
- Species: P. polygonus

Binomial name
- Pilosocereus polygonus (Lam.) Byles & G.D.Rowley

Synonyms
- List: Cactus polygonus Lam.; Cactus royenii L.; Cephalocereus monoclonos (DC.) Britton & Rose; Cephalocereus polygonus (Lam.) Britton & Rose; Cephalocereus royenii (L.) Britton & Rose; Cephalocereus schlumbergeri (F.A.C.Weber ex K.Schum.) Urb.; Cereus monoclonos DC.; Cereus polygonus (Lam.) DC.; Cereus royenii (L.) Mill.; Pilocereus monoclonos (DC.) F.M.Knuth; Pilocereus plumieri Lem.; Pilocereus polygonus (Lam.) Salm-Dyck; Pilocereus royenii (L.) Haw. ex Rümpler; Pilocereus schlumbergeri F.A.C.Weber ex K.Schum.; Pilosocereus monoclonos (DC.) Byles & G.D.Rowley; Pilosocereus royenii (L.) Byles & G.D.Rowley, tentatively listed as a synonym.

= Pilosocereus polygonus =

Species of cactus

Pilosocereus polygonus is a species of cactus (family Cactaceae). Like all species in the genus Pilosocereus, it has a shrub- or tree-like growth habit. It has been treated very differently at times. In the narrow circumscription adopted here, it is endemic to Hispaniola, a position adopted by Britton and Rose in 1920 and endorsed in a 2019 review of the genus in the Caribbean and northern Andes. Treatments in the late 1990s and early 2000s used a much broader circumscription, which included species now recognized as separate, thus giving P. polygonus a much wider distribution. As of July 2025, Plants of the World Online accepted Pilosocereus royenii as a synonym; however it has also been treated as a separate species. Broadly applied English names include dildo cactus, pipe organ cactus, and Royen's tree cactus.

== Description ==
When Pilosocereus polygonus is narrowly circumscribed, it is a species of cactus having green to gray-green stems with 8–13 ribs. Its branches are ascending, sometimes completely upright. The areoles have rigid spines up to 3 cm (1.2 in) long that are dull yellowish when new. Flowering areoles have dense tufts of silky hairs up to 3 cm (1.2 in) long. Non-flowering areoles have fewer hairs. The flowers are 5–7 cm (2.0–2.8 in) long, with reddish green outer segments (tepals) and white inner segments. The fruit is red.

== Taxonomy ==
Pilosocereus polygonus has a complicated taxonomic history. The species was first described by Jean-Baptiste Lamarck in 1785 as Cactus polygonus. It was transferred to the genus Pilocereus in 1845, but this genus name is illegitimate, and was replaced by Pilosocereus in 1957. In 1909, Britton and Rose placed the species in the genus Cephalocereus. In their 1920 treatment of this genus, Britton and Rose recognized 18 species in the Caribbean and northern Andes, one of which was Cephalocereus polygonus, which they regarded as endemic to Hispaniola. Many subsequent authors followed this approach when Cephalocereus was split and the relevant species placed in Pilosocereus. However, treatments in the late 1990s and early 2000s used many fewer species, often only three, with Pilosocereus polygonus given a very broad circumscription. A 2019 review of Pilosocereus in the Caribbean and northern Andes returned to a larger number of species with narrower circumscriptions. Pilosocereus polygonus was again regarded as endemic to Hispaniola.

The relationship between P. polygonus and the name Pilosocereus royenii has also varied. In 2001, Anderson described them as separate species. As of July 2025, Plants of the World Online regarded them as synonyms. Populations in Mexico treated as P. royenii by some authors are considered to be P. gaumeri by others, including Plants of the World Online as of July 2025. A species found in Puerto Rico and the Virgin Islands that has been called P. royenii is now treated as Pilosocereus armatus.

=== Subspecies ===
No subspecies were accepted by Plants of the World Online as of June 2025. Those that have been proposed are treated as full species:

- Pilosocereus polygonus subsp. brevispinus = Pilosocereus brevispinus – central Hispaniola
- Pilosocereus polygonus subsp. curtisii = Pilosocereus curtisii – Lesser Antilles
- Pilosocereus polygonus subsp. gaumeri = Pilosocereus gaumeri – southeast Mexico
- Pilosocereus polygonus subsp. jamaicensis = Pilosocereus jamaicensis – Cayman Islands, Jamaica

== Conservation ==
Under the synonym Pilosocereus royenii, it was assessed in 2011 as "Least Concern", but with a very much wider distribution.
