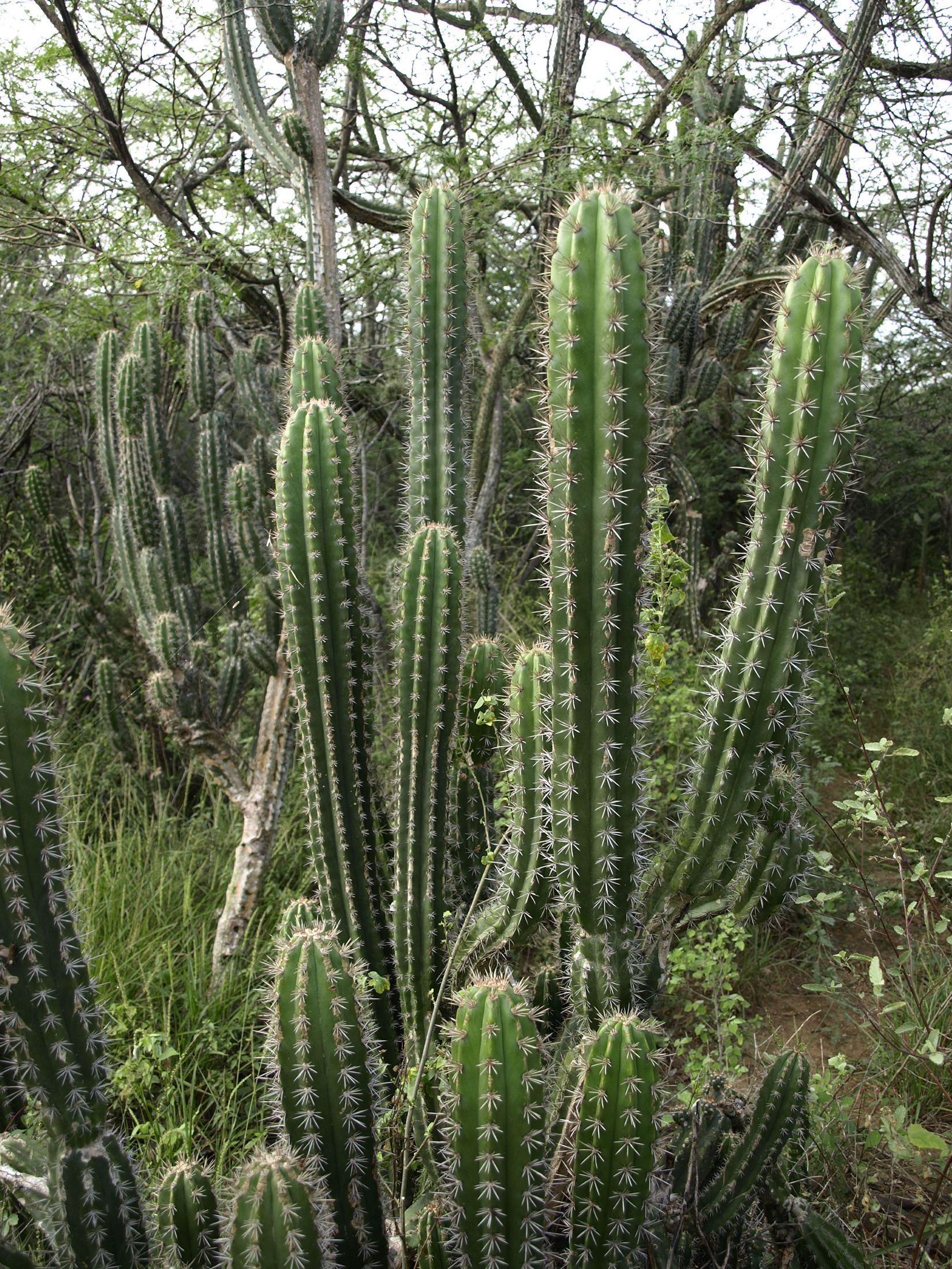

Conservation status
- Least Concern (IUCN 3.1)

Scientific classification
- Kingdom: Plantae
- Clade: Tracheophytes
- Clade: Angiosperms
- Clade: Eudicots
- Order: Caryophyllales
- Family: Cactaceae
- Subfamily: Cactoideae
- Genus: Stenocereus
- Species: S. heptagonus

Binomial name
- Stenocereus heptagonus (L.) Mottram

Synonyms
- Cactus heptagonus L. 1753; Cereus heptagonus (L.) Mill. 1768; Cactus fimbriatus Lam. 1785; Cactus hystrix Haw. 1819; Cephalocereus swartzii (Griseb.) Britton & Rose 1909; Cereus fimbriatus (Lam.) DC. 1828; Cereus grandispinus Haw. 1830; Cereus hystrix (Haw.) Salm-Dyck 1822; Cereus swartzii Griseb. 1861; Echinocactus hystrix Haw. 1830; Griseocactus fimbriatus (Lam.) Guiggi 2012; Griseocereus fimbriatus (Lam.) Guiggi 2012; Harrisia fimbriata (Lam.) F.M.Knuth 1936; Lemaireocereus hystrix (Haw.) Britton & Rose 1909; Neogriseocereus fimbriatus (Lam.) Guiggi 2013; Pilocereus fimbriatus Lem. 1862; Pilocereus grandispinus Lem. 1862; Pilosocereus swartzii (Griseb.) Byles & G.D.Rowley 1957; Rathbunia fimbriata (Lam.) P.V.Heath 1992; Ritterocereus fimbriatus (Lam.) Backeb. 1960; Stenocereus fimbriatus (Lam.) Lourteig 1991; Stenocereus hystrix (Haw.) Buxb. 1961

= Stenocereus heptagonus =

Species of cactus found in the West Indies

Stenocereus heptagonus is a species of cactus.

== Description ==
Stenocereus heptagonus grows as a tree-like cactus with numerous candelabra-like branches, reaching heights of 8 to 12 meters. It forms a distinct trunk, and its upright to slightly spreading shoots can reach up to 30 centimeters in diameter. The cactus has 9–12 sharply defined ribs, each up to 1.5 centimeters high. Its spines include three gray central spines, one longer than the others, up to 4 centimeters long, and about ten grayish peripheral spines.

The flowers, which open at night, are 7–9 centimeters long, greenish to slightly purple on the outside, and white on the inside. Its spherical, red fruits are 5–6 centimeters in diameter, covered with spines that fall off when ripe. The pulp is red, and the seeds are black.

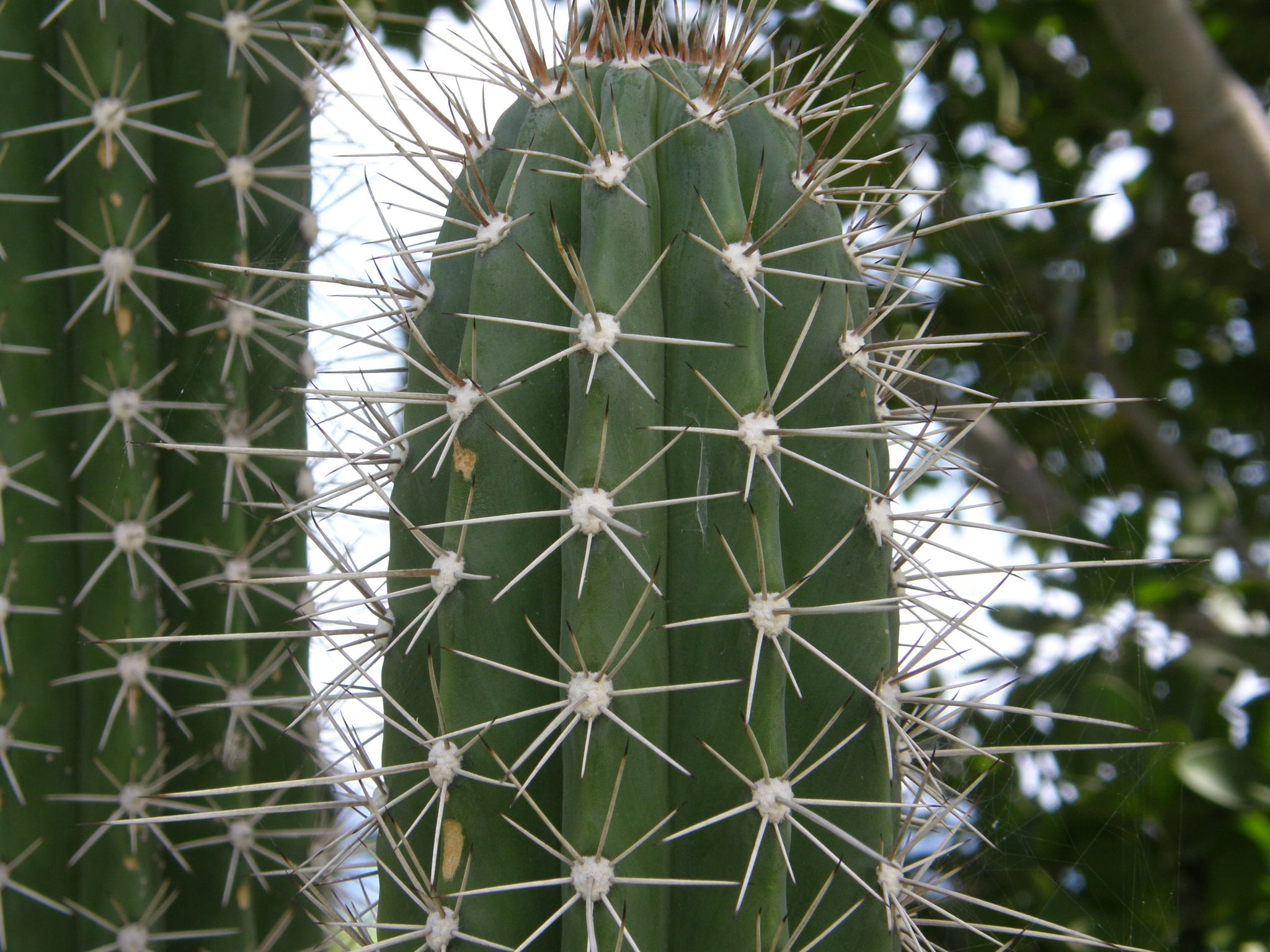
Stem tip

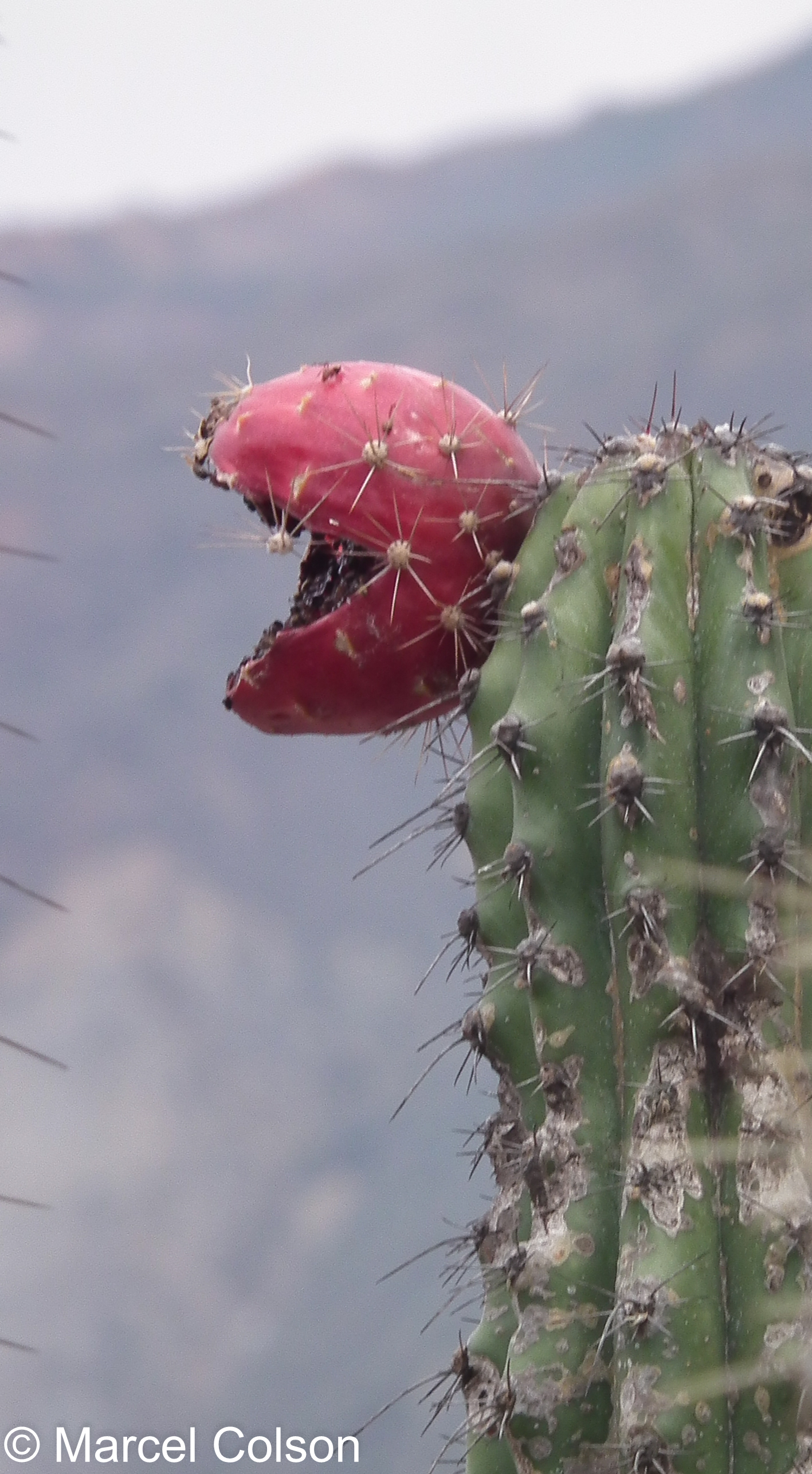
Fruit

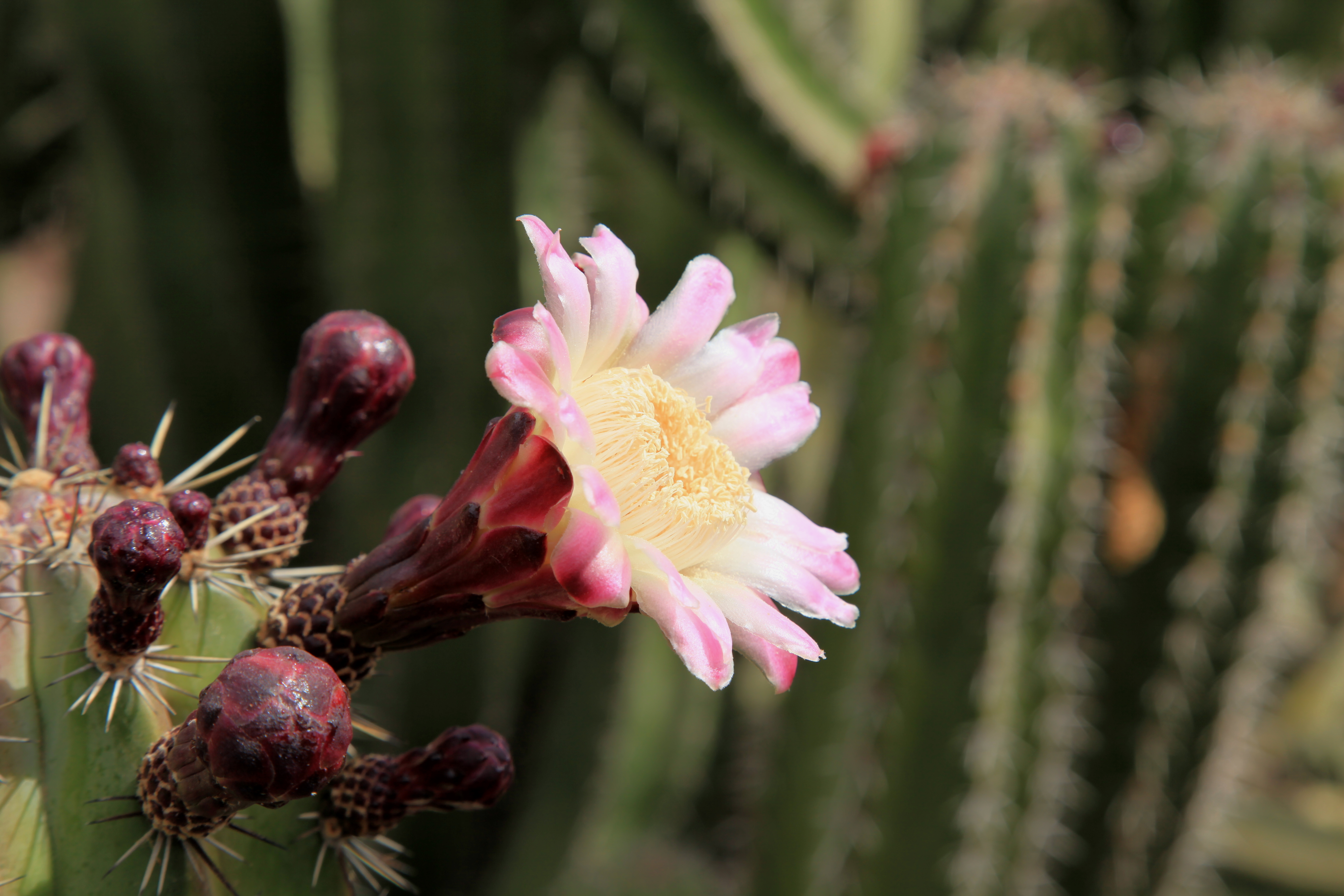
Flower

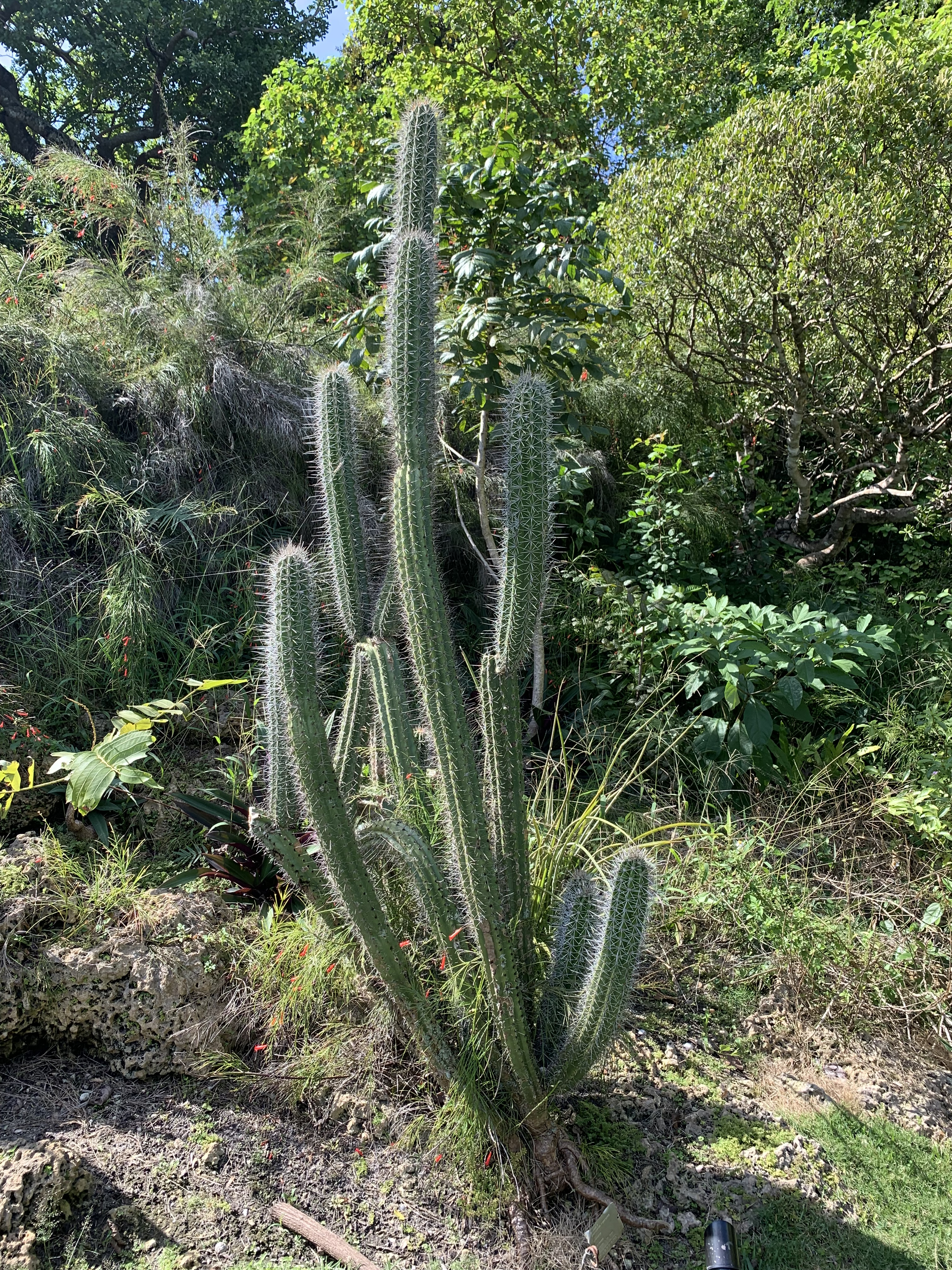
Adult Plant

== Distribution ==
Stenocereus heptagonus is endemic to the West Indies, including Saint John in the Virgin Islands, Jamaica, Cuba, Hispaniola (the Dominican Republic and Haiti), and Puerto Rico (mainly the islands of Caja de Muertos, Culebra, Desecheo, Magueyes and Mona). Its flowers are pollinated by bats such as Brachyphylla nana, Monophyllus redmani, and Phyllonycteris poeyi. Plants are found growing along with Bonellia stenophylla, Bourreria succulenta, Guaiacum officinale, and Maytenus loeseneri.

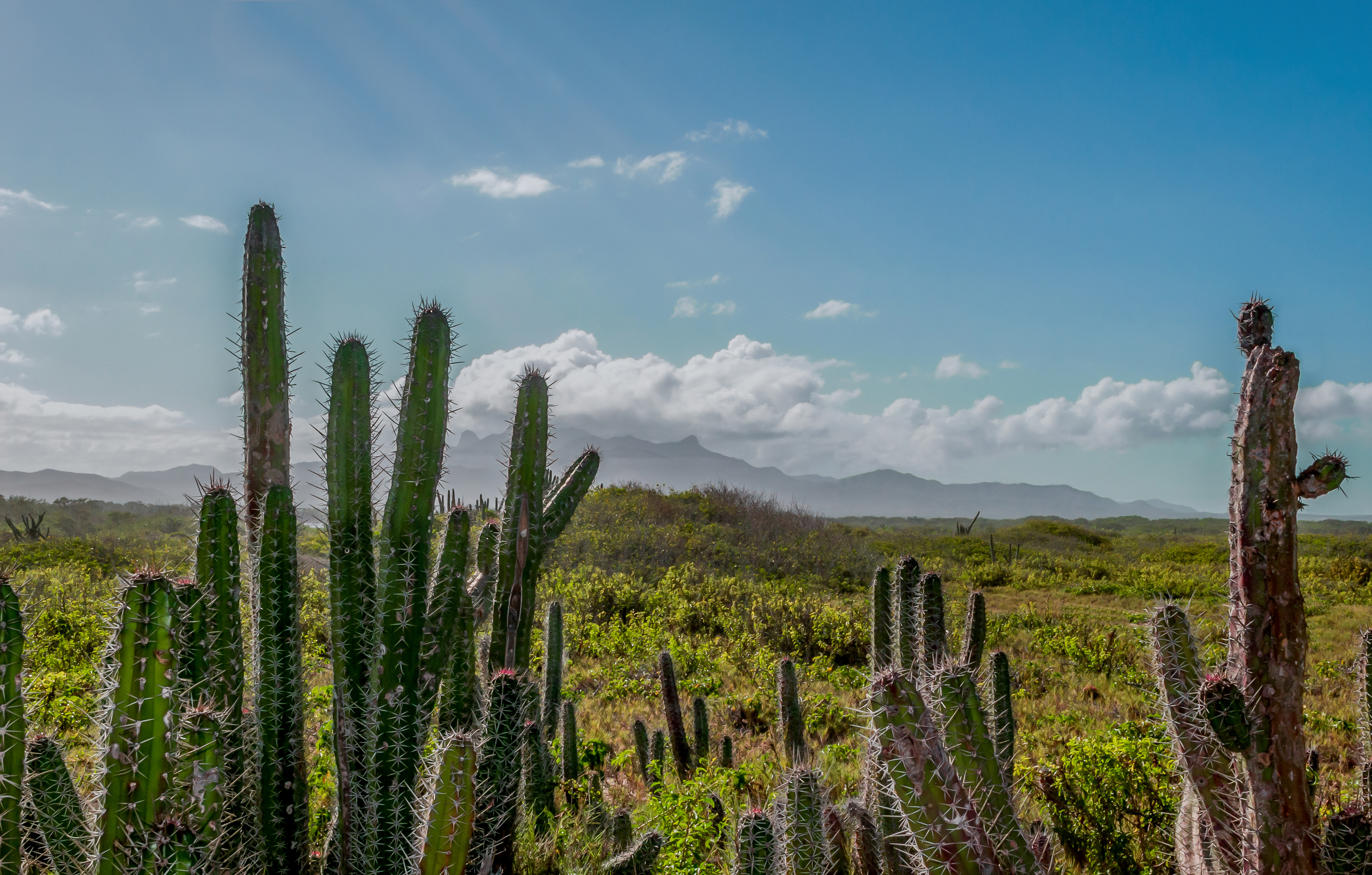
habitat in Macanao Peninsula, Margarita Island

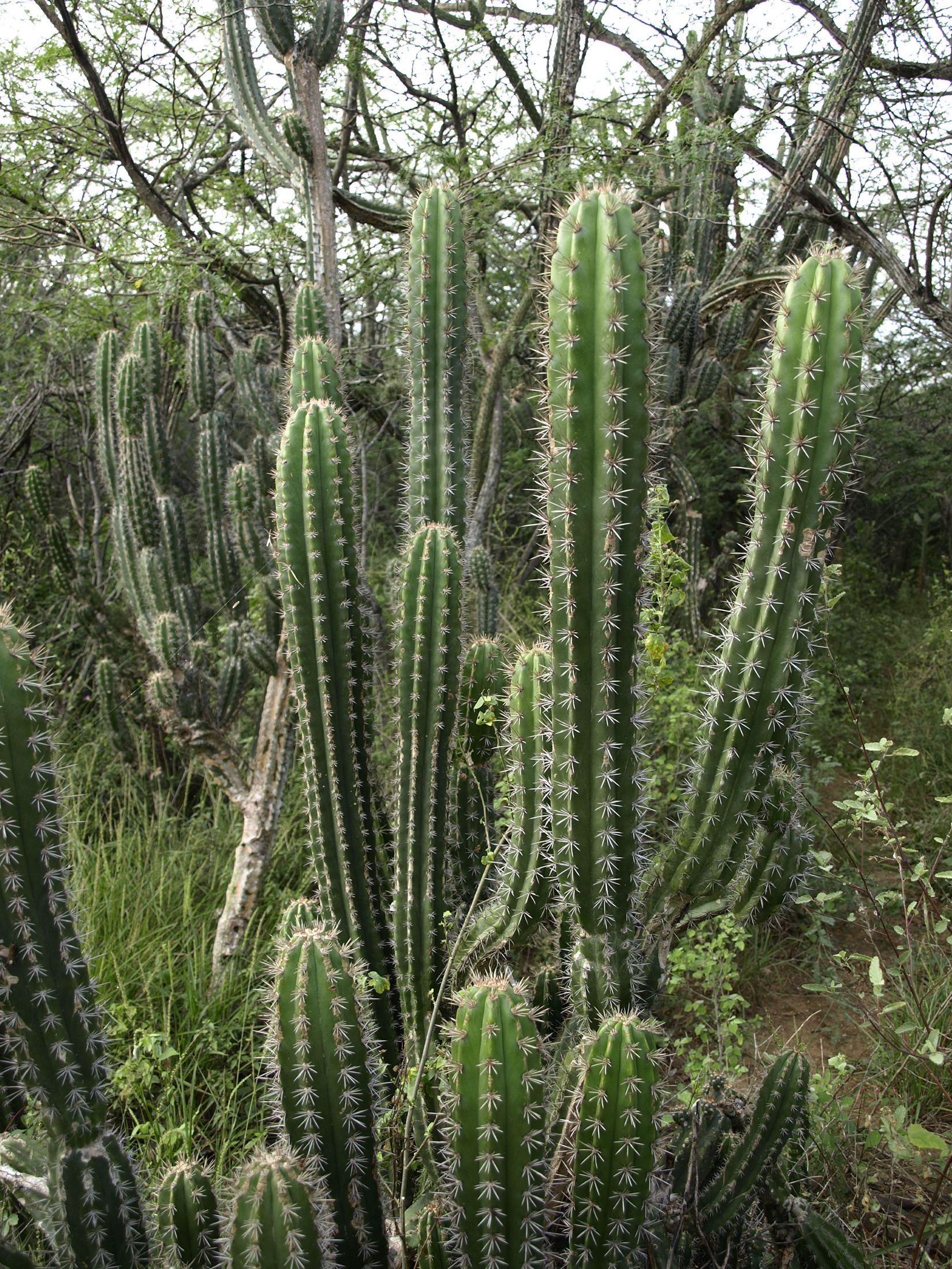
Plant growing in habitat in the Dominican Republic

== Taxonomy ==
The species was first described as Cactus fimbriatus by Jean-Baptiste de Lamarck in 1785 and reclassified into the genus Stenocereus by Alicia Lourteig in 1991.
