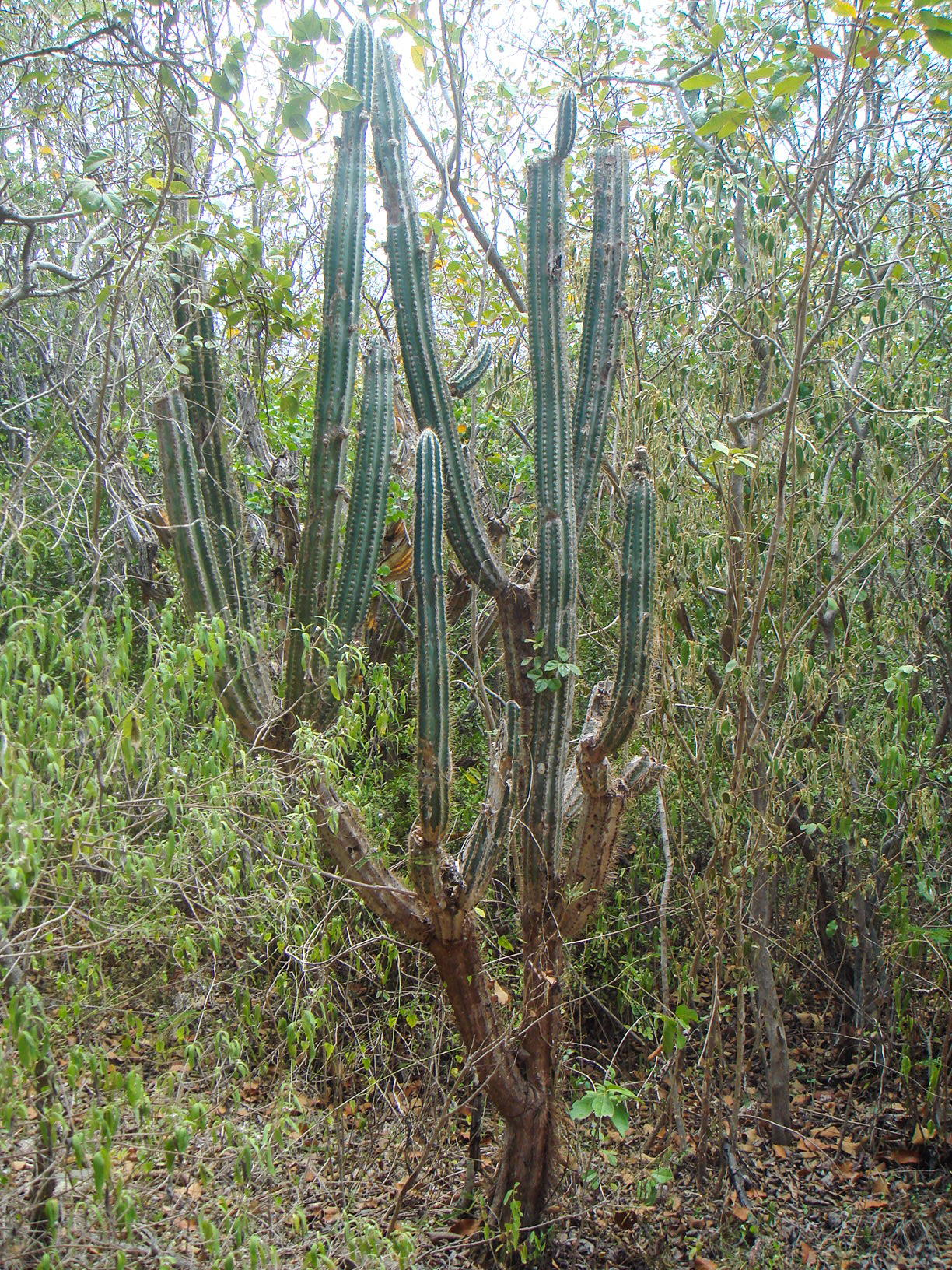
- In Guánica State Forest, Puerto Rico

Scientific classification
- Kingdom: Plantae
- Clade: Embryophytes
- Clade: Tracheophytes
- Clade: Angiosperms
- Clade: Eudicots
- Order: Caryophyllales
- Family: Cactaceae
- Subfamily: Cactoideae
- Genus: Pilosocereus
- Species: P. armatus

Binomial name
- Pilosocereus armatus (Otto ex Pfeiff.) A.R.Franck

Synonyms
- List: Cactus fimbriatus Descourt., nom. illeg.; Cactus fulvispinosus Spreng.; Cactus haworthii (DC.) Spreng.; Cactus niger (Salm-Dyck) Spreng.; Cactus strictus Willd., nom. illeg.; Cephalocereus nobilis var. nigricans Borg; Cephalocereus nobilis (Haw.) Britton & Rose; Cephalocereus nobilis f. cristatus P.V.Heath; Cephalocereus royenii f. cristatus P.V.Heath; Cephalocereus strictus (Link & Otto) Borg; Cereus armatus Otto ex Pfeiff.; Cereus barbadensis A.Berger; Cereus floccosus Otto ex Pfeiff.; Cereus fouachianus (F.A.C.Weber) Vaupel; Cereus fulvispinosus Haw.; Cereus fulvispinus Salm-Dyck, sphalm.; Cereus gloriosus Pfeiff.; Cereus haworthii DC.; Cereus leiocarpus Bello; Cereus lutescens Salm-Dyck ex Pfeiff.; Cereus mollis Pfeiff.; Cereus niger Salm-Dyck; Cereus nigricans J.Forbes; Cereus nigricans Lem., nom. illeg.; Cereus nobilis Haw.; Cereus pfeifferi J.Parm. ex Pfeiff.; Cereus polyptychus Lem.; Cereus royenii var. armatus (Otto ex Pfeiff.) Salm-Dyck ex Walp.; Cereus royenii var. floccosus Monv. ex Labour.; Cereus strictus Link & Otto; Cereus trichacanthus Salm-Dyck; Pilocereus barbadensis A.Berger; Pilocereus floccosus (Otto ex Pfeiff.) Lem.; Pilocereus fouachianus F.A.C.Weber; Pilocereus fulvispinosus (Haw.) K.Schum.; Pilocereus haworthii (DC.) Console; Pilocereus lutescens (Salm-Dyck ex Pfeiff.) C.F.Först. & Rümpler; Pilocereus niger (Salm-Dyck) Poit.; Pilocereus nigricans (J.Forbes) Sencke ex Lem.; Pilocereus nobilis (Haw.) A.Berger; Pilocereus polyptychus (Lem.) Rümpler; Pilocereus royenii var. armatus Rümpler; Pilocereus strictus (Link & Otto) C.F.Först. & Rümpler; Pilocereus trichacantus C.F.Först. & Rümpler; Pilosocereus nobilis (Haw.) Byles & G.D.Rowley; Pseudopilocereus nobilis (Haw.) Buxb.

= Pilosocereus armatus =

Species of cactus

Pilosocereus armatus is a species of flowering plant in the cactus family Cactaceae, native to the Virgin Islands and Puerto Rico. It was first described by Christoph Friedrich Otto in 1837 as Cereus armatus, and transferred to the genus Pilosocereus in 2021. It has been treated as Pilosocereus royenii, and Pilocereus royenii var. armatus is among its many synonyms. However, P. royenii is a name without a clear application.

== Description ==
Pilosocereus armatus has bluish green stems with 7–11 ribs. Its branches are usually upright. Areoles have spines up to 6 cm (2.4 in) long and silky hairs up to 4 cm (1.6 in) long. Non-flowering areoles have fewer hairs. The flower is 5–7 cm (2.0–2.8 in) long. The inner perianth segments are pinkish, the outer ones pinkish to pale green. The fruit is red.

== Taxonomy ==
There has been considerable confusion over the correct name for a species of the genus Pilosocereus found in Puerto Rico and the Virgin Islands. Sources have used Pilosocereus royenii, a name based on Linnaeus' Cactus royenii. However, the original description of C. royenii does not make clear its origin and precise identification. In 2019, an attempt was made to validate C. royenii by designating a neotype. This did not succeed because it did not take into account the earlier designation of a different neotype in 2013, which also failed to make clear its origin and precise identification. The earliest available basionym is Cereus armatus; hence as of June 2025, the accepted name was Pilosocereus armatus.

== Distribution ==
Pilosocereus armatus is native to Puerto Rico and the Virgin Islands.
