= George Franklin Gaumer =

Early naturalist in Mexico's Yucatan

George Franklin Gaumer in 1917

George Franklin Gaumer (1850–1929) was an American doctor and naturalist, born in Monroe, Indiana. In 1868, he enrolled at a university in Kansas, graduating in 1876. He traveled to Cuba in 1878, to Mexico's Yucatán Peninsula from 1878 to 1881, and through the Southwestern United States from 1882 to 1884. During these expeditions, he collected numerous biological specimens, particularly birds.

In 1884, Gaumer settled permanently in the Yucatán Peninsula, where he practiced medicine in Izamal while continuing his extensive biological collecting. He is credited with discovering several species previously unknown to science. Many of his collections were sent to specialists at the British Museum in London and the Field Museum of Natural History in Chicago. He published his scientific observations in both English and Spanish.

== As a doctor in Yucatán ==
In Izamal, Gaumer established a chemical and botanical laboratory, which he named the Izamal Chemical Company. After his death, the company was continued by his two sons. A catalog published in Spanish in 1908 described the company's services and products, beginning with a list of fluid extracts of medicinal plants sold in half-liter bottles.

The first item listed is an extract of Adiantum tricolipis Fee (sic). This name appears to correspond to Adiantum tricholepis, a species of maidenhair fern found throughout much of Mexico. Traditionally known in Spanish as cilantrillo, the plant has been reputed to have medicinal properties. Its extracts have been used as a mouthwash for tooth abscesses and other dental problems, and applied to the skin for conditions described as "scabs caused by filth" as well as for fungal infections.

The Izamal Chemical Company received official recognition, being awarded a silver medal and a special diploma. Gaumer and his son George, who was also a physician, were awarded a bronze medal and a diploma.

== As a naturalist ==
During his travels in Cuba, Mexico, and the Southwestern United States, Gaumer focused primarily on collecting bird specimens, though he also gathered plants, for Godman and Salvin's Biologia Centrali-Americana (1888). Later, in Mexico's Yucatán Peninsula, his work centered mainly on plants, although he also collected numerous animal specimens. Organisms preserved by Gaumer are now housed in institutions around the world, including the Swedish Museum of Natural History, the Field Museum of Natural History in Chicago, the Real Jardín Botánico de Madrid, the Royal Botanic Gardens, Kew in London, the Missouri Botanical Garden in St. Louis, the Berlin Botanical Garden and Botanical Museum and Free University of Berlin, and the Herbario Nacional de México in Mexico City.

According to specimen data from the Global Biodiversity Information Facility (GBIF), the Bionomia website lists 14,881 specimens collected and/or identified by Gaumer. The records show that his interests extended broadly across taxa; the first specimen listed is a mushroom.

== Collecting plants in the Yucatán Peninsula ==
Gaumer is primarily remembered for his botanical collections from the Yucatán. With assistance at times from his two sons, he is estimated to have preserved more than 24,000 specimens, pressed and dried as herbarium material, which were distributed to numerous institutions.

Of these collections, about 226 have been designated as types for species that were new to science at the time of description. Over the years, some of these names have been reclassified as synonyms of previously known species. Nevertheless, Gaumer's contributions have been acknowledged by researchers, with approximately 50 plant species named in his honor. One example is the large cactus Pilosocereus gaumeri.

The significance of Gaumer's collections can be illustrated through his contributions to orchidology. In a 2009 review of 500 years of orchid studies in Central America by Carlos Ossenbach, two orchid species are noted as first described from specimens collected by Gaumer: Triphora yucatanensis Ames and Epidendrum yucatanense Schltr., later reclassified as Encyclia xipheres (Rchb.f.) Schltr.

Other orchid species collected by Gaumer include:

- Ionopsis utricularioides (Sw.) Lindl.
- Rhyncholaelia digbyana (Lindl.) Schltr.
- Leochilus scriptus (Scheidw.) Rchb.f.
- Harrisella porrecta (Rchb.f.) Fawc. & Rendle, now Dendrophylax porrectus
- Oncidium sphacelatum Lindl.
- Psygmorchis pusilla (L.) Dodson & Dressler, now Erycina pusilla
- Lophiaris oerstedii (Rchb.f.) R. Jiménez & Carnevali, now Trichocentrum oerstedii (Rchb.f.) R. Jiménez & Carnevali
- Encyclia belizensis (Rchb.f.) Schltr., later revised as Encyclia alata subsp. virella

== Collecting animals in the Yucatán Peninsula ==
Gaumer also made significant contributions to the study of animals in the Yucatán. In 1917, he published a detailed monograph of more than 300 pages on the mammals of the region. One species, Gaumer's spiny pocket mouse (Heteromys gaumeri), was named in his honor.

Gaumer was also noted for his extensive collecting of seashells. The website Conchology.be includes him in its "Shellers from the Past and Present" section.

== Gaumer's work in historical context ==
Gaumer's contributions from the Yucatán Peninsula can be better understood within the context of the difficulties and dangers associated with scientific collecting in the region during the late 19th century. Writing in 1891, the geologist Angelo Heilprin observed:

It is currently believed that no white man, except at extreme risk to his life, can penetrate into the interior either from the west or from the north; but the experience of Consul Thornpson [sic] (Edward Herbert Thompson), as proved by his travels, shows that good judgment and a knowledge of the Maya language may effectually protect a non-Mexican from the dangers of assault which are certainly intended to be directed solely against the Mexicans and their supporters—in other words, against those to whom the revolted Indians decline to recognize allegiance.

Heilprin added that it was easier to enter the region from the British possessions along the Caribbean coast, noting that "it is from that side that Dr. Gaumer, the well-known collector of birds (now a resident of Izamal), and his wife penetrated."

The "revolted Indians" to whom Heilprin referred were Maya groups engaged in the Caste War of Yucatán (1847–1915), a prolonged conflict in which many indigenous Maya sought to reclaim land and autonomy from the Criollo and Mestizo populations of the peninsula.
