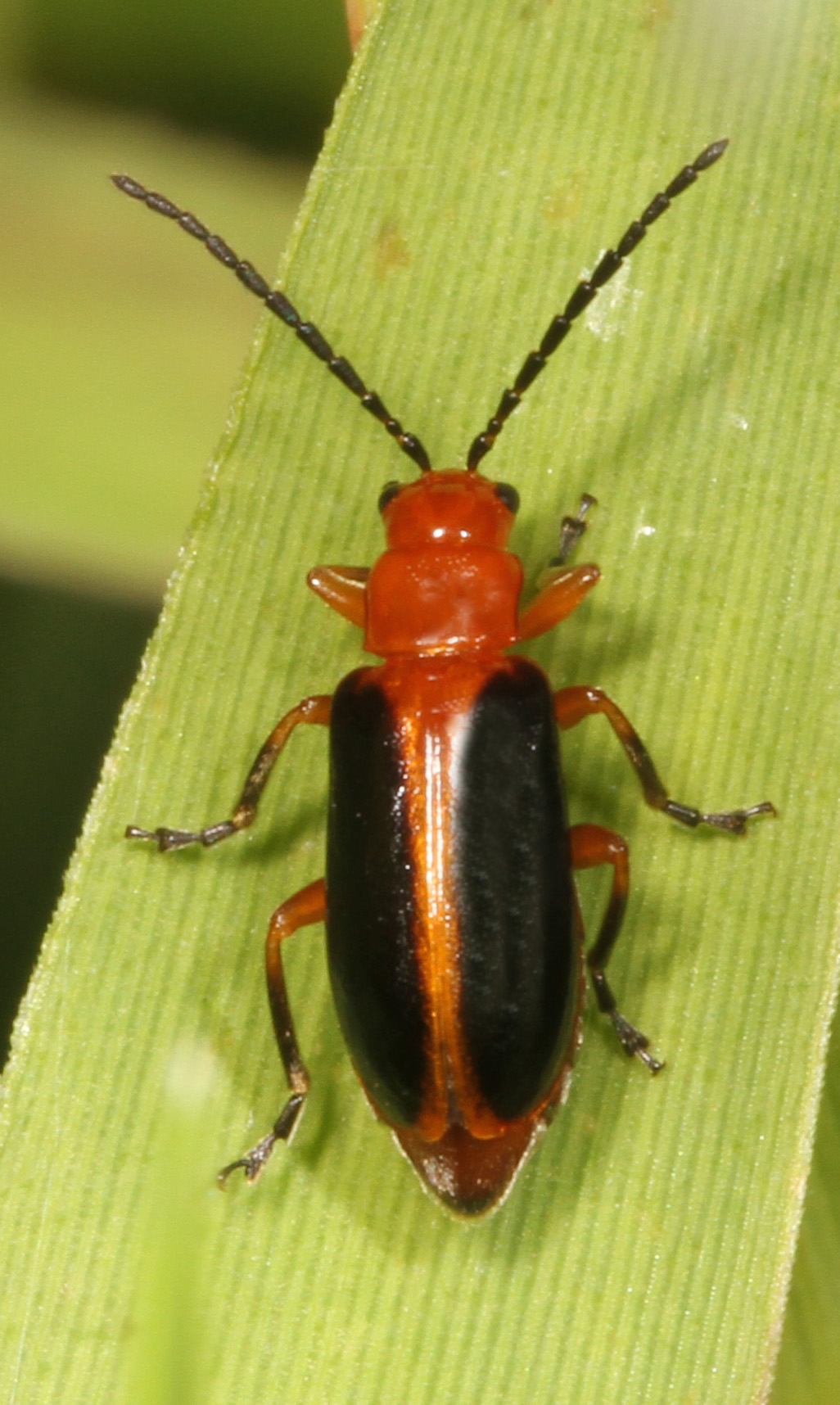
- Phyllobrotica limbata

Scientific classification
- Kingdom: Animalia
- Phylum: Arthropoda
- Clade: Pancrustacea
- Class: Insecta
- Order: Coleoptera
- Suborder: Polyphaga
- Infraorder: Cucujiformia
- Family: Chrysomelidae
- Subfamily: Galerucinae
- Tribe: Luperini
- Subtribe: Luperina
- Genus: Phyllobrotica; Chevrolat, 1836

Synonyms
- Stachysivora Farrell & Mitter, 1990

= Phyllobrotica =

Genus of beetles

Phyllobrotica is a genus of skeletonizing leaf beetles and flea beetles in the family Chrysomelidae. There are at least 18 described species in Phyllobrotica.

== Species ==
- Phyllobrotica antennata Schaeffer, 1932
- Phyllobrotica blakeae Hatch, 1971
- Phyllobrotica circumdata (Say, 1824)
- Phyllobrotica costipennis Horn, 1893
- Phyllobrotica decorata (Say, 1824)
- Phyllobrotica leechi Blake, 1956
- Phyllobrotica lengi Blatchley, 1910
- Phyllobrotica limbata (Fabricius, 1801)
- Phyllobrotica luperina J. L. LeConte, 1865
- Phyllobrotica nigripes Horn, 1893
- Phyllobrotica nigritarsi Linell, 1898
- Phyllobrotica nigritarsis Linell, 1897
- Phyllobrotica physostegiae E. Riley, 1979
- Phyllobrotica sequoiensis Blake, 1956
- Phyllobrotica sororia Horn, 1896
- Phyllobrotica stenidea Schaeffer, 1932
- Phyllobrotica viridipennis (J. L. LeConte, 1859)
- Phyllobrotica vittata Horn, 1893
