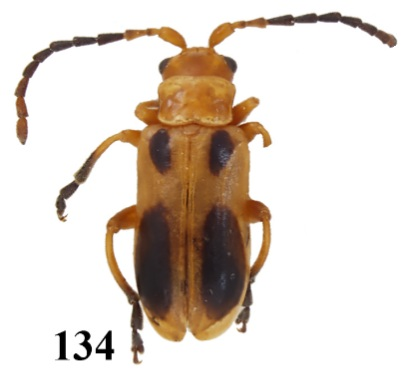

Scientific classification
- Kingdom: Animalia
- Phylum: Arthropoda
- Clade: Pancrustacea
- Class: Insecta
- Order: Coleoptera
- Suborder: Polyphaga
- Infraorder: Cucujiformia
- Family: Chrysomelidae
- Genus: Phyllobrotica
- Species: P. sororia

Binomial name
- Phyllobrotica sororia Horn, 1896

= Phyllobrotica sororia =

Species of beetle

Phyllobrotica sororia, the four-spotted Texas Phyllobrotica, is a species of skeletonizing leaf beetle in the family Chrysomelidae. It is found in North America, where it is only found in Texas.

== Biology ==
The recorded foodplant is Scutellaria drummondii.
