= Phyllobrotica viridipennis =

Scientific classification
- Kingdom: Animalia
- Phylum: Arthropoda
- Clade: Pancrustacea
- Class: Insecta
- Order: Coleoptera
- Suborder: Polyphaga
- Infraorder: Cucujiformia
- Family: Chrysomelidae
- Genus: Phyllobrotica
- Species: P. viridipennis

Binomial name
- Phyllobrotica viridipennis (J. L. LeConte, 1859)

Species of beetle

Phyllobrotica viridipennis is a species of skeletonizing leaf beetle in the family Chrysomelidae. It is found in North America.

== Subspecies ==
These two subspecies belong to the species Phyllobrotica viridipennis:

- Phyllobrotica viridipennis mokelensis Blake, 1956
- Phyllobrotica viridipennis viridipennis (J. L. LeConte, 1859)
