= Phyllobrotica circumdata =

Scientific classification
- Kingdom: Animalia
- Phylum: Arthropoda
- Clade: Pancrustacea
- Class: Insecta
- Order: Coleoptera
- Suborder: Polyphaga
- Infraorder: Cucujiformia
- Family: Chrysomelidae
- Genus: Phyllobrotica
- Species: P. circumdata

Binomial name
- Phyllobrotica circumdata (Say, 1824)

Species of beetle

Phyllobrotica circumdata is a species of skeletonizing leaf beetle in the family Chrysomelidae. It is found in North America.
