= Phyllobrotica sequoiensis =

Scientific classification
- Kingdom: Animalia
- Phylum: Arthropoda
- Clade: Pancrustacea
- Class: Insecta
- Order: Coleoptera
- Suborder: Polyphaga
- Infraorder: Cucujiformia
- Family: Chrysomelidae
- Genus: Phyllobrotica
- Species: P. sequoiensis

Binomial name
- Phyllobrotica sequoiensis Blake, 1956

Species of beetle

Phyllobrotica sequoiensis is a species in the family Chrysomelidae ("leaf beetles"), in the order Coleoptera ("beetles"). It is found in North America.
