= Cambodian cuisine =

Culinary traditions of Cambodia

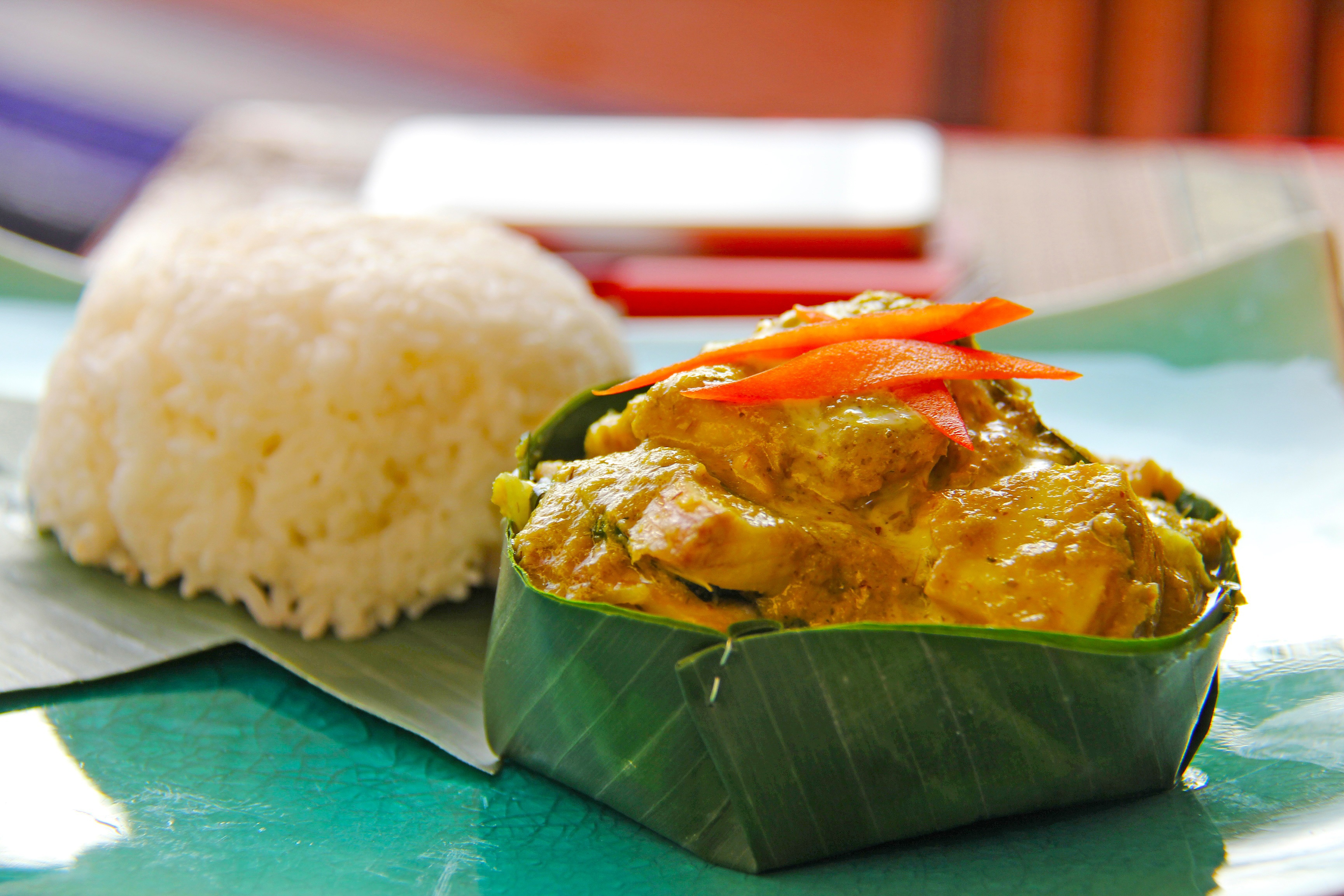
One of Cambodia's national dishes, fish amok, served with jasmine rice.

Cambodian cuisine is the national cuisine of Cambodia. It reflects the varied culinary traditions of different ethnic groups in Cambodia, central of which is Khmer cuisine (Khmer: សិល្បៈធ្វើម្ហូបខ្មែរ, lit. 'Khmer culinary art'), the nearly-two-thousand-year-old culinary tradition of the Khmer people. Over centuries, Cambodian cuisine has incorporated elements of Indian, Chinese (in particular Teochew), French, and Portuguese cuisines. Due to some of these shared influences and mutual interaction, Cambodian cuisine has many similarities with the cuisines of Central Thailand, and Southern Vietnam and to a lesser extent also Central Vietnam, Northeastern Thailand and Laos.

Cambodian cuisine can be categorized into three main types: rural, elite and royal cuisine. Although there is some distinction between royal and popular cuisine, it is not as pronounced as in Thailand and Laos. Cambodian royal dishes tend to feature a wider variety of higher-quality ingredients and contain more meat.

== Historical influences ==
=== 1st–9th century ===
Archaeological evidence shows that by the 1st and 2nd centuries, the region's inhabitants had already settled in small communities that cultivated rice and raised animals. As early as the 1st century, the communities along the Mekong and the Tonlé Sap were growing rice and gathering seafood and fish from the sea, rivers, and lakes.

Around the 2nd century, Indian merchants introduced many spices to Khmer cuisine. The Indian influence on cuisine among other aspects of Khmer culture was already noted by a Chinese visitor around 400 AD. From South India through Java, Khmer royal cuisine adopted the preparation of curry pastes, adding lemongrass and galangal to the recipe. According to Cambodian anthropologist Ang Choulean, the influence of Indian cuisine on rural Cambodian cuisine has been limited or even non-existent.

A passage in the Book of Sui describes the diet of 7th-century Chenla inhabitants, noting that it "includes a lot of butter, milk-curds, powdered sugar, rice, and also millet, from which they make a sort of cake which is soaked in meat juices and eaten at the beginning of the meal."

=== 9th–15th century ===
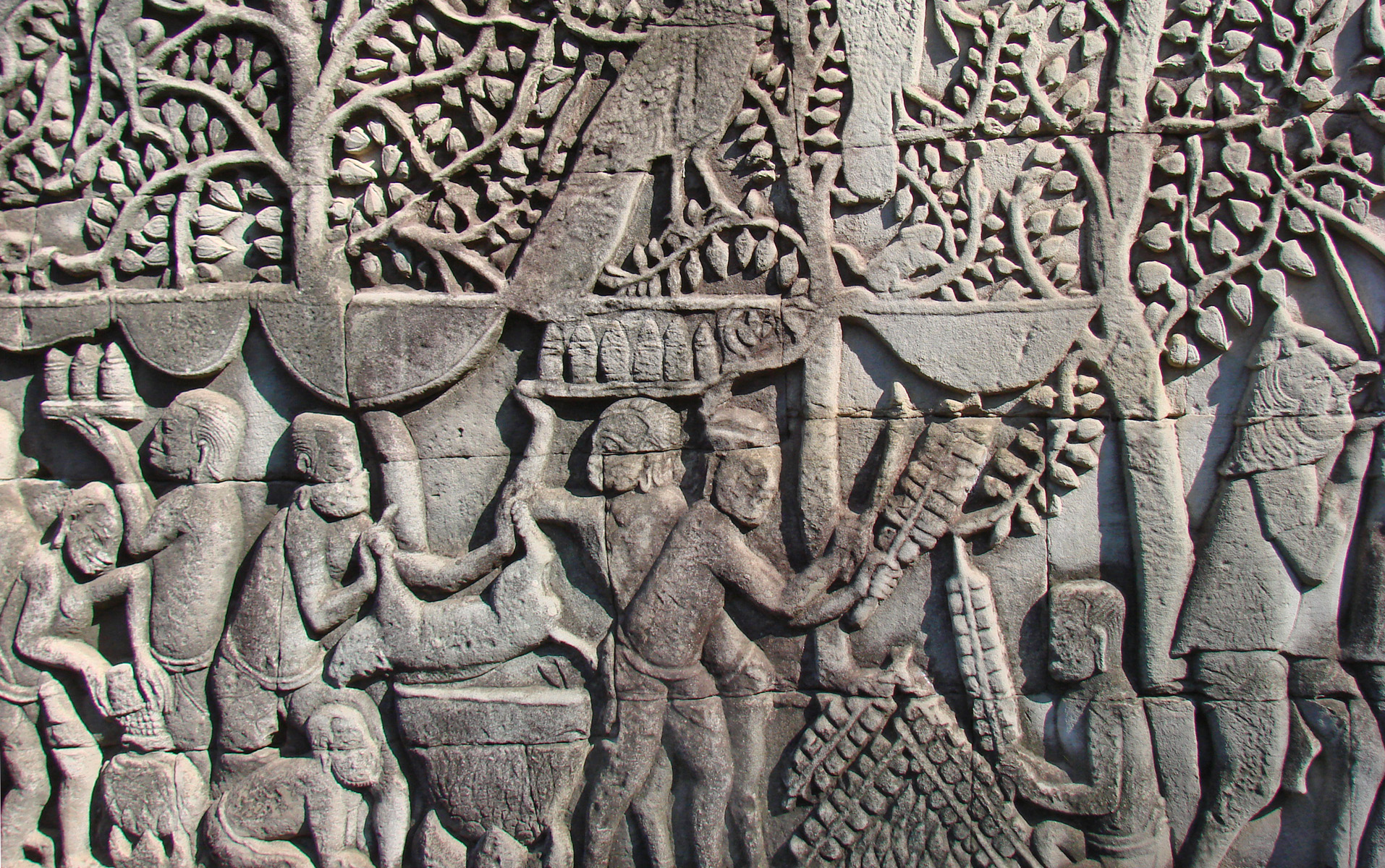
A bas-relief of the 12th/13th century Bayon temple depicting a Khmer outdoor kitchen cooks grilling sang vak and cooking rice and a wild boar and servers carrying away trays of food.

Between 9th and 15th century the culinary influence of the growing Khmer Empire spread beyond the borders of modern-day Cambodia into what is now Thailand, Laos, Vietnam, and Indonesia. According to Chinese diplomat Zhou Daguan's account, onions, mustard, chives, eggplants, watermelons, winter gourds, snake gourds, amaranth and many other vegetables, as well pomegranates, sugarcane, lotus flowers, lotus roots, Chinese gooseberries, bananas, lychees, oranges, and many other fruits were available in the Khmer Empire in late 13th century.

Food crops and other plants were actively cultivated and harvested in tropical gardens both in and around cities and temples of the Khmer Empire. Archaeobotanical investigations at Angkor Wat and Ta Prohm have identified macroremains of rice, sesame, mung beans, crepe ginger, black peppers, long peppers, and either citron or kaffir lime rind, as well as phytoliths from plants of Cucurbitaceae, Mus, Arecaceae, and Canarium families, while archaeobotanical investigations at 14th–15th century Angkor Thom have identified macroremains of rice, sesame, mung beans, pigeon peas, hyacinth beans, and yardlong beans.

For centuries, Khmer Empire was the dominant Indianized civilization in the region and its influence extended to the culinary arts. The Khmer Empire played a mediating role in transferring the Indian culinary influence now fundamental to Central Thai cuisine. The close affinity between Cambodian and Central Thai cuisine has been attributed to the extensive, centuries-long contact between the Khmer Empire and Ayutthaya Kingdom. The flavour principles of many Cambodian dishes, such as sour fish soups, stews and coconut-based curries, including steamed curries, share very similar flavour profiles with Central Thai cuisine. However, Cambodian dishes tend to use less chili and sugar, instead emphasizing aromatic spices such as cardamom, star anise, cloves, and nutmeg, along with lemongrass, ginger, galangal, coriander, and wild lime leaves.

Khmer cuisine has also influenced Thailand's Isan cuisine and Khmer cuisine is very popular in the region's lower southern provinces of Surin, Sisaket and Buriram that have a large Northern Khmer population. Khmer-influenced dishes of the Surin province include sanlo chek, salot rao or kaeng phueak, ang kaep bop, and som jruk. As Thai tribes migrated southwards they were influenced by the Khmer practice of fermenting fish and adopted local ingredients, including prahok, which became imbedded in the Isan (as pla ra) and Lao cuisine (as padaek) from the time both Isan and Laos were part of the Khmer Empire.

Lao cuisine has influenced the cuisine of Cambodia through Lao migration into the country. Khmer cuisine has much less in common with Isan and Lao cuisines than with Central Thai cuisine.

=== 16th–18th century ===
In the beginning of 16th century, Portuguese merchants and explorers arrived in Cambodia, introducing a variety of fruits and vegetables from South America, Europe and other parts of Asia. These included papayas, tomatoes, pineapples, peanuts, cashews, avocados, vanilla, apples, passion fruit and sweet potatoes. However, the Portuguese influence on Cambodian cuisine extended beyond just ingredients. The traditional Khmer dessert krop khno (គ្រាប់ខ្នុរ) is a direct descendant of Portuguese fios de ovos, and Cambodian egg cakes num barang (នំបារាំង) are also believed to have Portuguese origins.

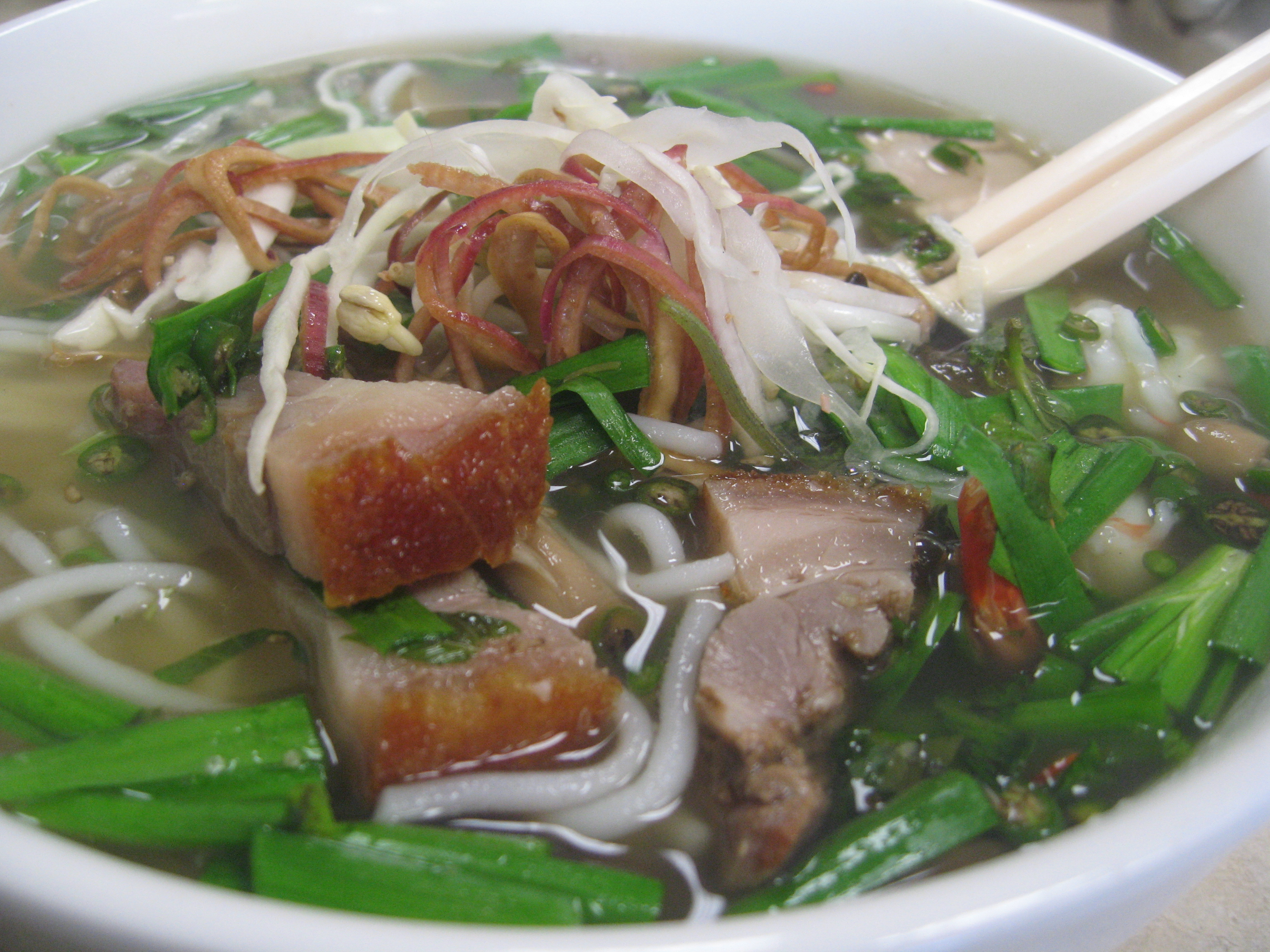
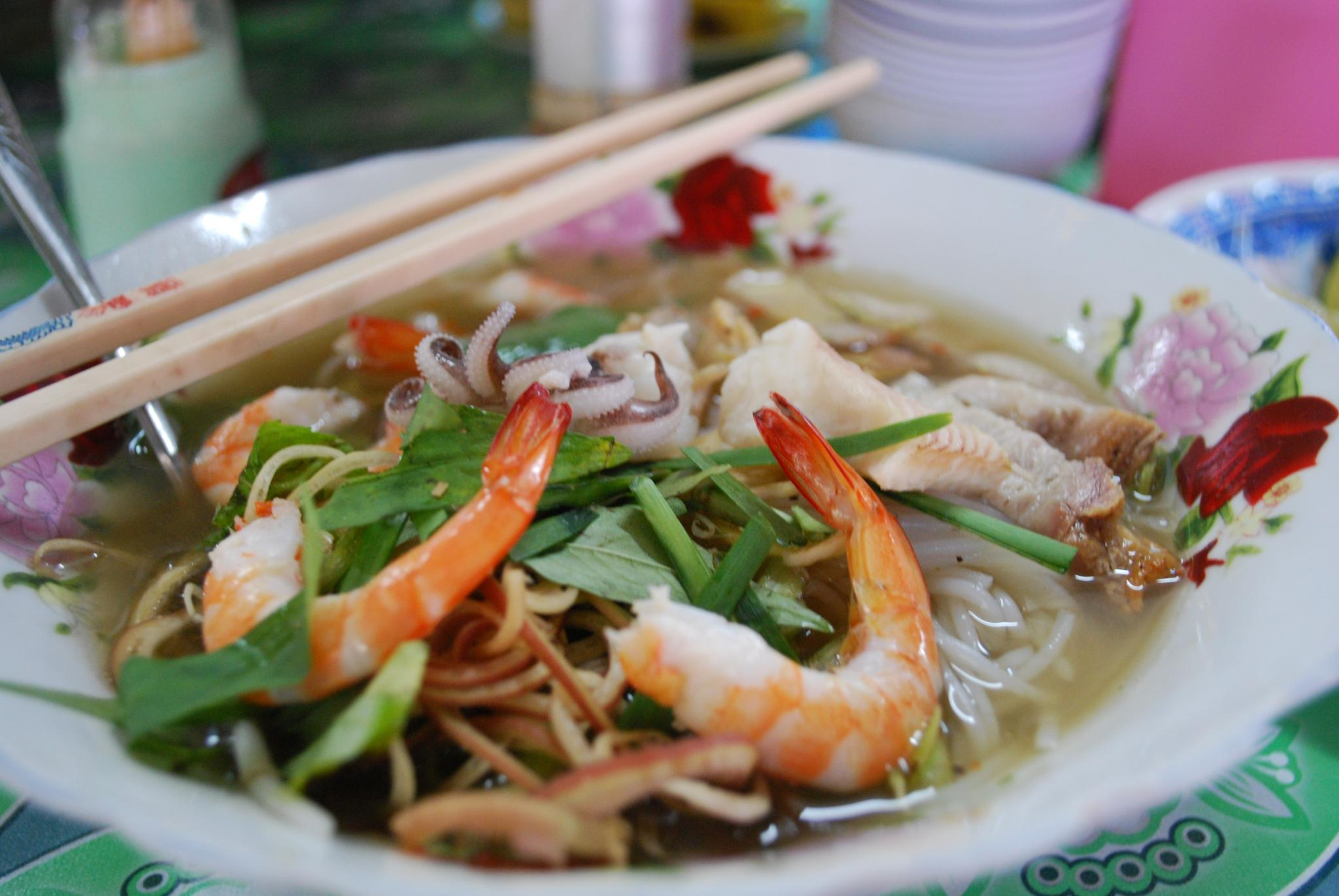
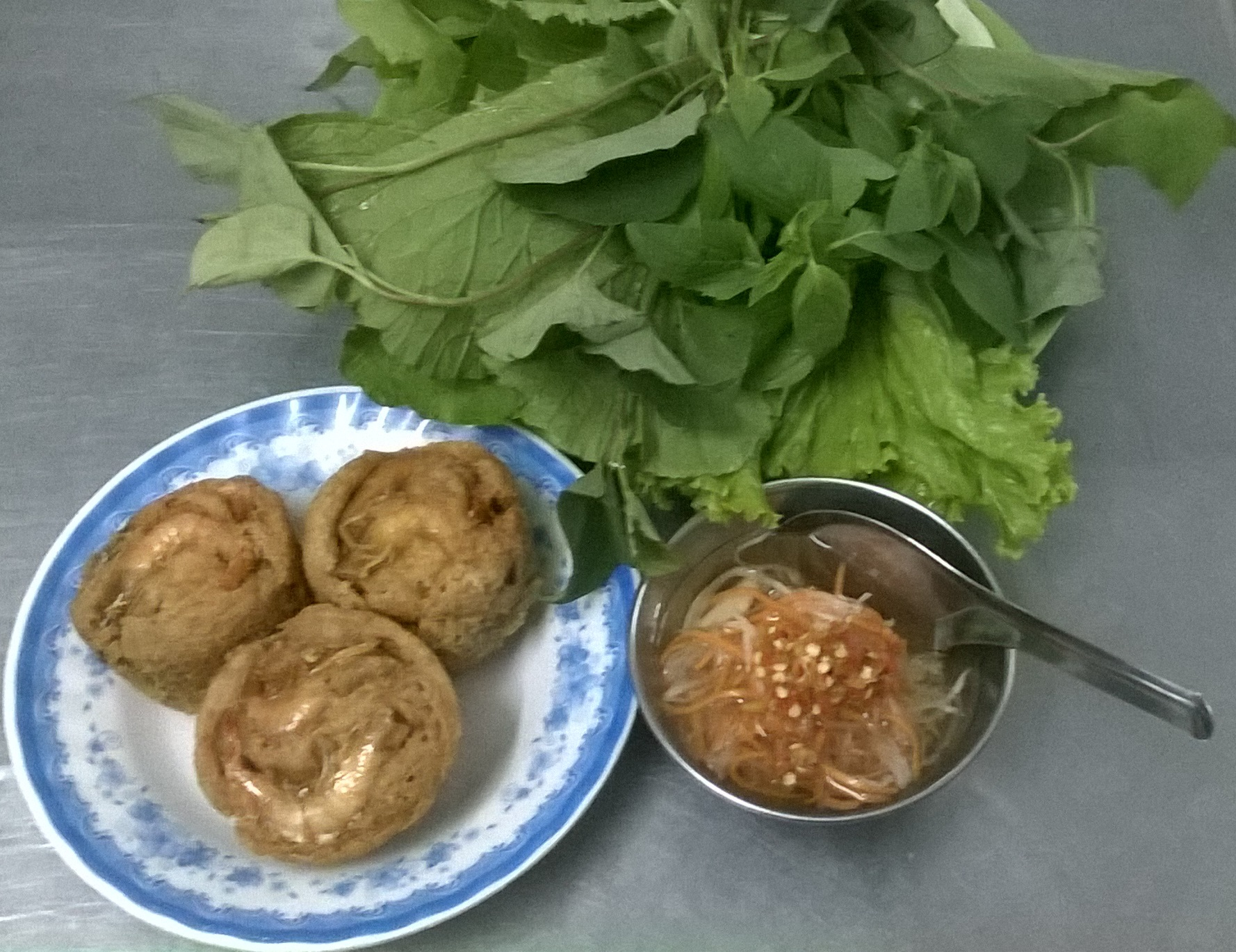
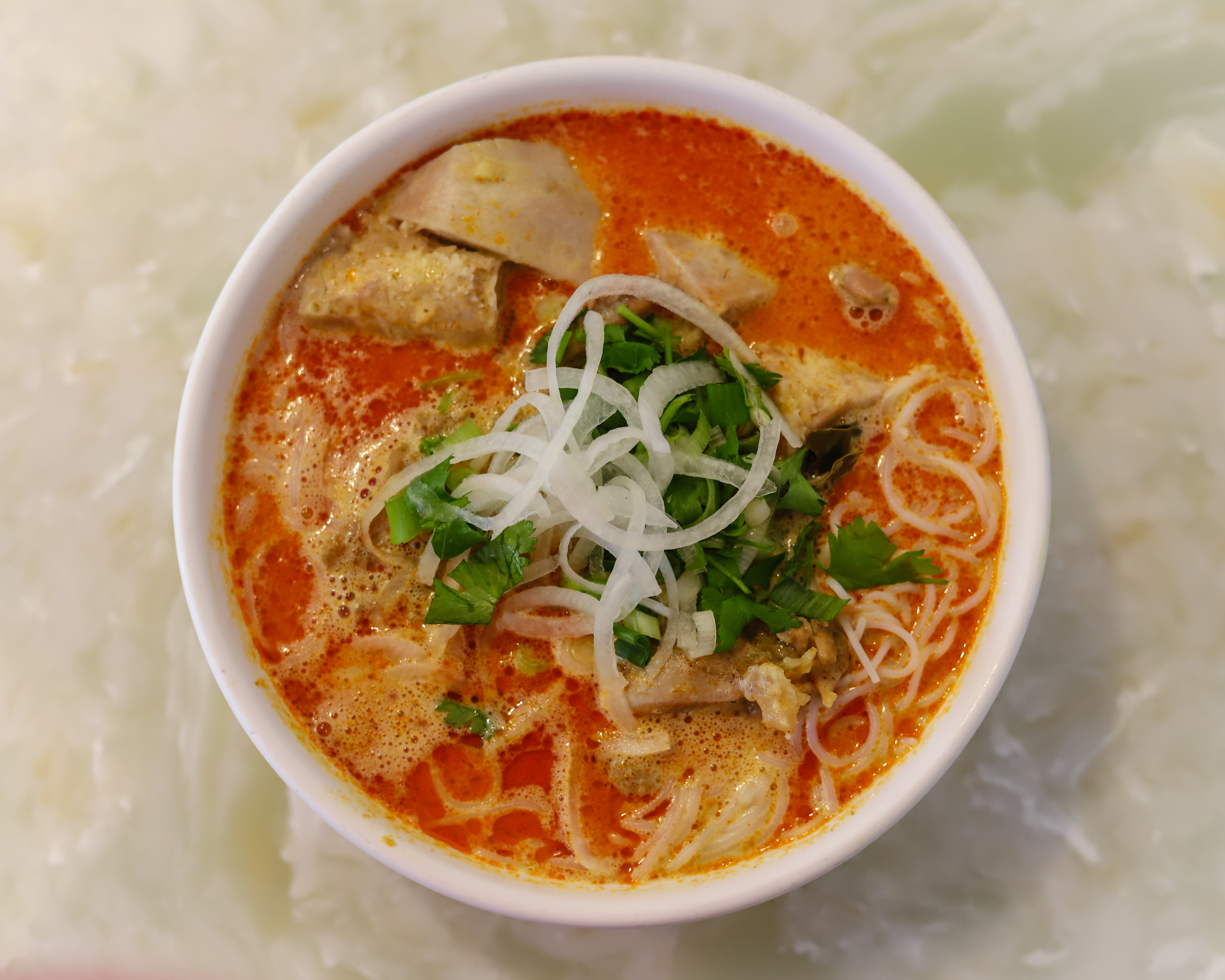
Khmer-influenced Vietnamese dishes: bún nước lèo'; bún mắm; bánh cống; cà ri (clockwise from top left)

From the 18th century onwards, the ingredients and dishes of Mekong Delta's indigenous Khmer Krom, most notably spices (cardamom, cinnamon, star anise, clove, ginger, turmeric and ground coriander), curries and fermented food have influenced the cuisine of modern-day Southern Vietnam as large numbers of Vietnamese began settling in the area. Khmer Krom dishes, such as bún nước lèo, bún mắm and canh xiêm lo have been adopted by the region's Vietnamese and Chinese people, while Khmer Krom have adopted the Vietnamese lẩu mắm and canh chua and Chinese Yang Chow fried rice into their cuisine. Khmer specialties from the Sóc Trăng province, such as cốm dẹp and nom kapong (នំកំប៉ុង) have gained popularity throughout the Mekong Delta and other parts of Vietnam. Khmer-style crepes known as ọm chiếl are commonly sold in food stalls around the Mekong Delta, especially in Trà Vinh province. Conversely, the Vietnamese influence on Cambodian cuisine intensified during two centuries of Vietnamese rule in Cambodia. Dishes that Cambodian cuisine is believed to have been borrowed from the Vietnamese include beef lok lak and nem noeung.

=== 19th–20th century ===
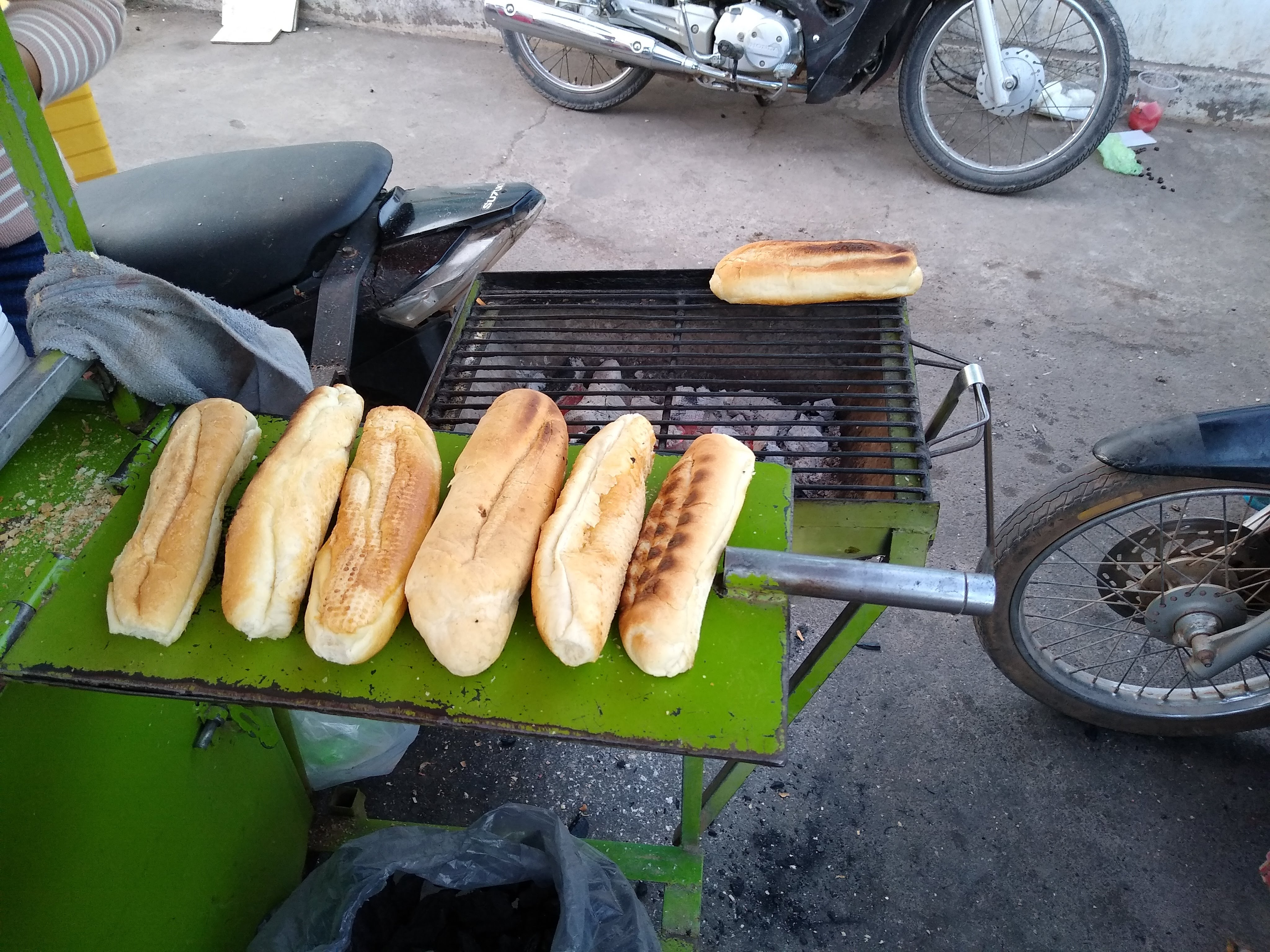
Toasted baguettes for sale in Kampot

From 1863 to 1953, Cambodia was a French protectorate, which led to the adoption of French culinary elements into Cambodian cuisine. Baguettes, or more often demi-baguettes, have become common in Cambodia, often used to make sandwiches with butter, sardines in oil or with pâté. They are also eaten with curries as an alternative to fresh rice noodles or rice. For breakfast, slices of baguette topped with melted cheese, pork liver pâté, or sardines in oil are sometimes served alongside fried eggs or omelettes. The French introduced several ingredients to Cambodian cooking, such as potatoes, onions, butter, margarine, and carrots. Fried potatoes are featured in the so-called "English" version of lok lak, carrots are added to soups, lettuce leaves or sliced onions are incorporated in other Cambodian dishes. Butter and margarine have become preferred fats in Cambodian cuisine. Other Khmer adoptions from the French cuisine include coffee, condensed milk, chocolate, beer and wine. The French influence is shared with Vietnamese and Lao cuisine as Vietnam, Laos and Cambodia were all part of French Indochina.

In the decades following World War II, many Cambodian urban middle-class and elite families employed cooks trained in French cuisine, and the children of these households often did not learn cooking themselves. The transmission of Cambodian culinary knowledge was further disrupted by the Cambodian Civil War and Cambodian genocide in the 1970s and 1980s. During the rule of Khmer Rouge, Cambodian cuisine was reduced to a plain rice gruel and Cambodians were forced to start catching and eating insects, frogs, snakes, snails and other small animals to avoid starvation. A lingering remnant of this era is the practice of eating fried spiders (a-ping), which are now sold as street food to tourists and still consumed by some locals, particularly in Skuon, for which it has earned the nickname Spiderville.

=== 21st century ===
Nowadays, more and more Asian fast food chains (such as The Pizza Company, Lotteria, Pepper Lunch, Yoshinoya and Bonchon) and Western fast food chains (such as Burger King, KFC, Krispy Kreme and Carl's Jr.) have entered the Cambodian market, especially in Phnom Penh, and fast food has become increasingly integrated into the Cambodian food scene, particularly among the younger generation.

Since the early 2010s, an emerging grassroots culinary movement in Siem Reap, called "New Cambodian Cuisine", has gained momentum. It loosely consists of six Cambodian chefs and restaurateurs (Pola Siv, Sothea Seng, Pol Kimsan and Sok Kimsan, Mengly Mork and Pheak Tim) who are experimenting with and modernizing traditional Cambodian dishes. More recently, mobile applications dedicated to Khmer traditional recipes have also been developed, such as "Khmer Cooking Recipe" downloaded more than 100,000 times on Google Play and "Khmer Cooking".

==== In the United States (20th–21st century) ====
Since the late 1970s, approximately 200,000 Cambodians have settled in the United States of America, nearly half in Southern California, fleeing the Khmer Rouge and the following economic and political turmoil in Cambodia. Cambodian Americans own about 9,000 businesses, predominantly restaurants and grocery stores catering to the local Cambodian American community. Cambodian Americans own around 90% of the 5,000 independently owned doughnut shops in California. The most successful of them was Ted Ngoy who at the peak of his success owned about 70 doughnut shops in California and was nicknamed "The Donut King".

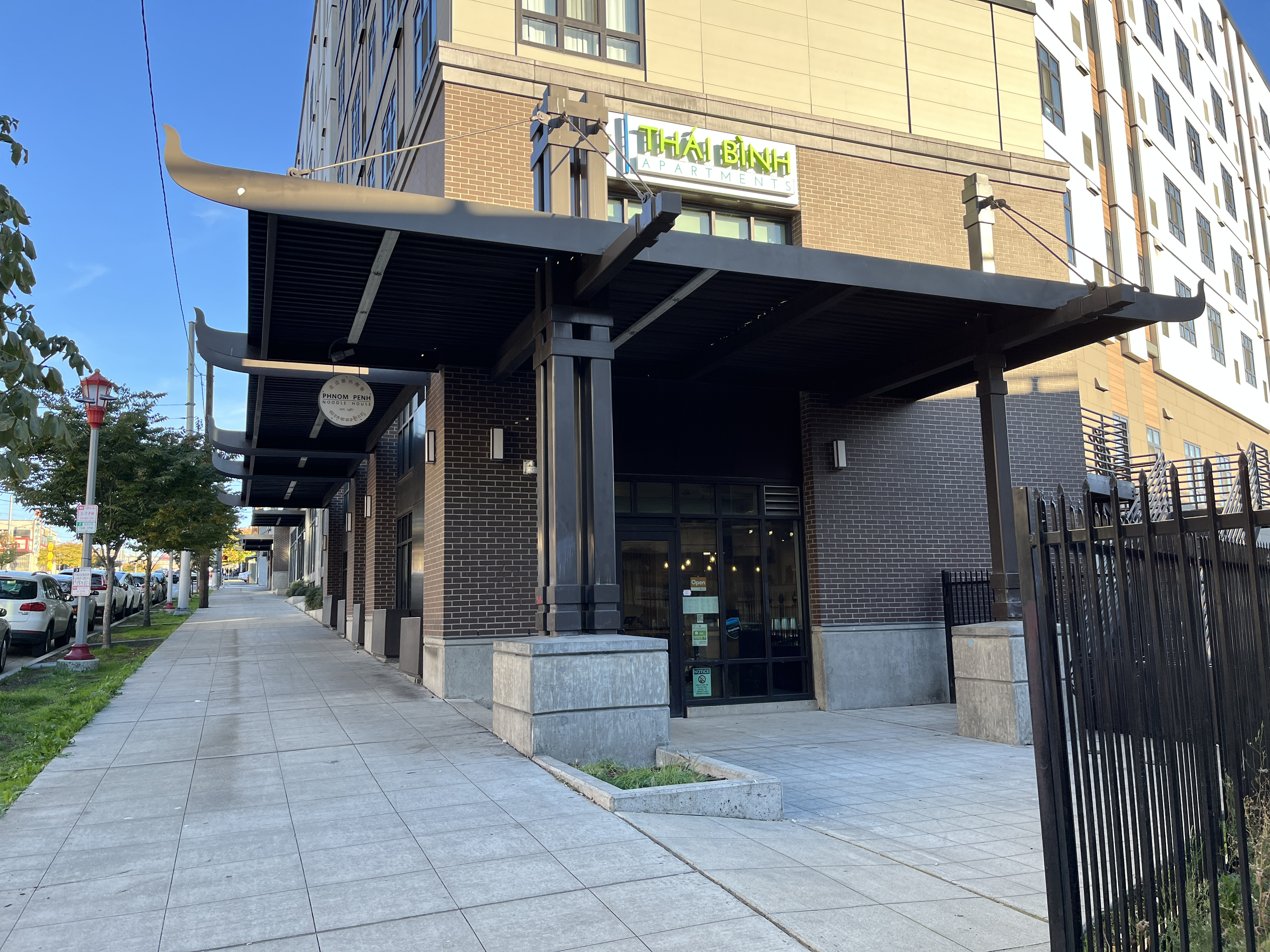
Phnom Penh Noodle House in Seattle.

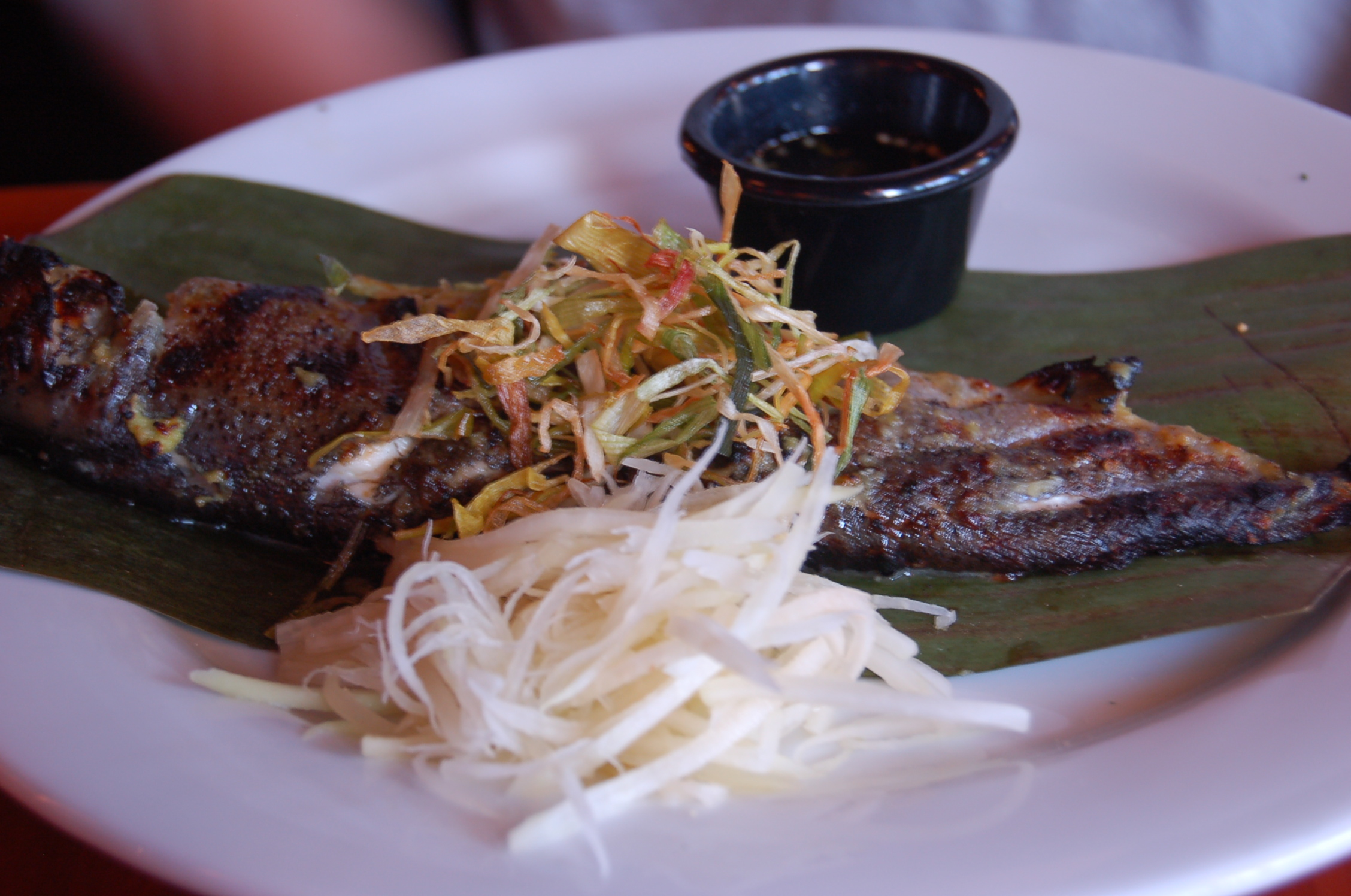
Grilled trout (trey ang) with a coconut-ginger sauce served at the Elephant Walk restaurant in Cambridge, Massachusetts.

Over time the food cooked by Cambodians in the United States developed into a distinct Cambodian American variety. Meat, especially beef and chicken, plays a much more central role in Cambodian American meals, which also make much more extensive use of tomatoes and corn. Unhealthy eating habits, such as consumption of fatty meat, and obesity rates are higher for the Cambodian Americans who experienced more severe food deprivation and insecurity in the past. The food of second- and third-generation Cambodian Americans has become more Americanized. Cambodian cuisine is not well known in the United States and is usually compared to Thai food by many Americans. Most Cambodian restaurants are located in cities with a significant Cambodian population, such as Lowell, Massachusetts, Long Beach, California and Seattle, Washington. Some of the Cambodian-owned restaurants, however, served other Asian cuisines, especially Thai and Chinese, whereas in the ones that serve Cambodian cuisine Chinese, Thai and Vietnamese-influenced dishes usually dominate over Khmer dishes.

Long Beach, California has the most Cambodian restaurants in the U.S.: twenty-two, including Phnom Penh Noodle Shack and Sophy's. Some Cambodian-owned restaurants in the city, such as Little La Lune Cuisine and Crystal Thai Cambodian, serve Thai food, while others, such as Hak Heang or Golden Chinese Express, serve Chinese food. Lowell, Massachusetts, has at least twenty Cambodian restaurants, among them Tepthida Khmer and Simply Khmer. Other notable Cambodian restaurants include Sok Sab Bai in Portland, as well as Phnom Penh Noodle House and Queen's Deli in Seattle. The most famous Cambodian restaurant in the U.S. is the Elephant Walk, serving French-inspired Khmer cuisine. It was opened in 1991 in Cambridge, Massachusetts by Longteine de Monteiro. The restaurant also created a cookbook of the same name, which is the first Cambodian American cookbook.

In 2000, a part of Central Long Beach was officially designated as Cambodia Town, where since 2005 an annual parade and culture festival takes place that also features Cambodian cuisine. Since the late 2010s there has been an emerging wave of second-generation Cambodian American chefs and restaurants in the U.S. focusing on Cambodian cuisine. Among them is the award-winning restaurant Nyum Bai, opened in Fruitvale, Oakland, California in 2018 by chef Nite Yun.

== Geographic variations ==
In Cambodia's coastal regions, dishes with saltwater fish are more common. Kampot was once renowned for its deep-fried pomfret with garlic, sugar, lime juice and chilies. The colonial resort town of Kep historically hosted numerous fine dining seafood restaurants along the promenade that after the city's destruction by Khmer Rouge in the 1970s have been replaced by individual vendors offering simpler seafood dishes, such as crabs sauteed with onions and black pepper, or pieces of dried squid, pounded or grilled over a wood fire served with pickled papaya and cucumbers.

In the northern part of the country, along the Cambodia–Thailand border, dishes are influenced by Thai cuisine and contain an increased amount of coconut milk, chillies and sugar. In northern Cambodia, dishes also include game meats, such as venison and wild bird meat, and bamboo shoots, popular in Lao cuisine, are more frequently used. In northwest Cambodia, remnants of the Khmer imperial cuisine are present, particularly in its steamed curries. In Cambodia's upland areas, the availability of wild vegetables is decreasing due to the enclosure of common forests and indigenous Khmer Loeu households are increasingly adopting Khmer-style cooking and meat-heavy diet introduced by Khmer migrants.

The differences between rural and urban cuisines are more pronounced than regional variations. Rural cuisine tends to be simpler, relying largely on ingredients that locals can grow or gather themselves. Beef is rare and while pigs and chickens are commonly raised, meat is used sparingly. Due to the high cost of spices and the labour-intensive process of grating meat and extracting coconut milk, curries are typically reserved for special occasions and holidays. In contrast, the ingredients in urban cuisine are more diverse and the dishes more developed, though there remains a notable difference between the food eaten by the poor and the wealthy. Some of the haute cuisine in urban areas originates in the imperial court.

== Kitchen and eating utensils ==
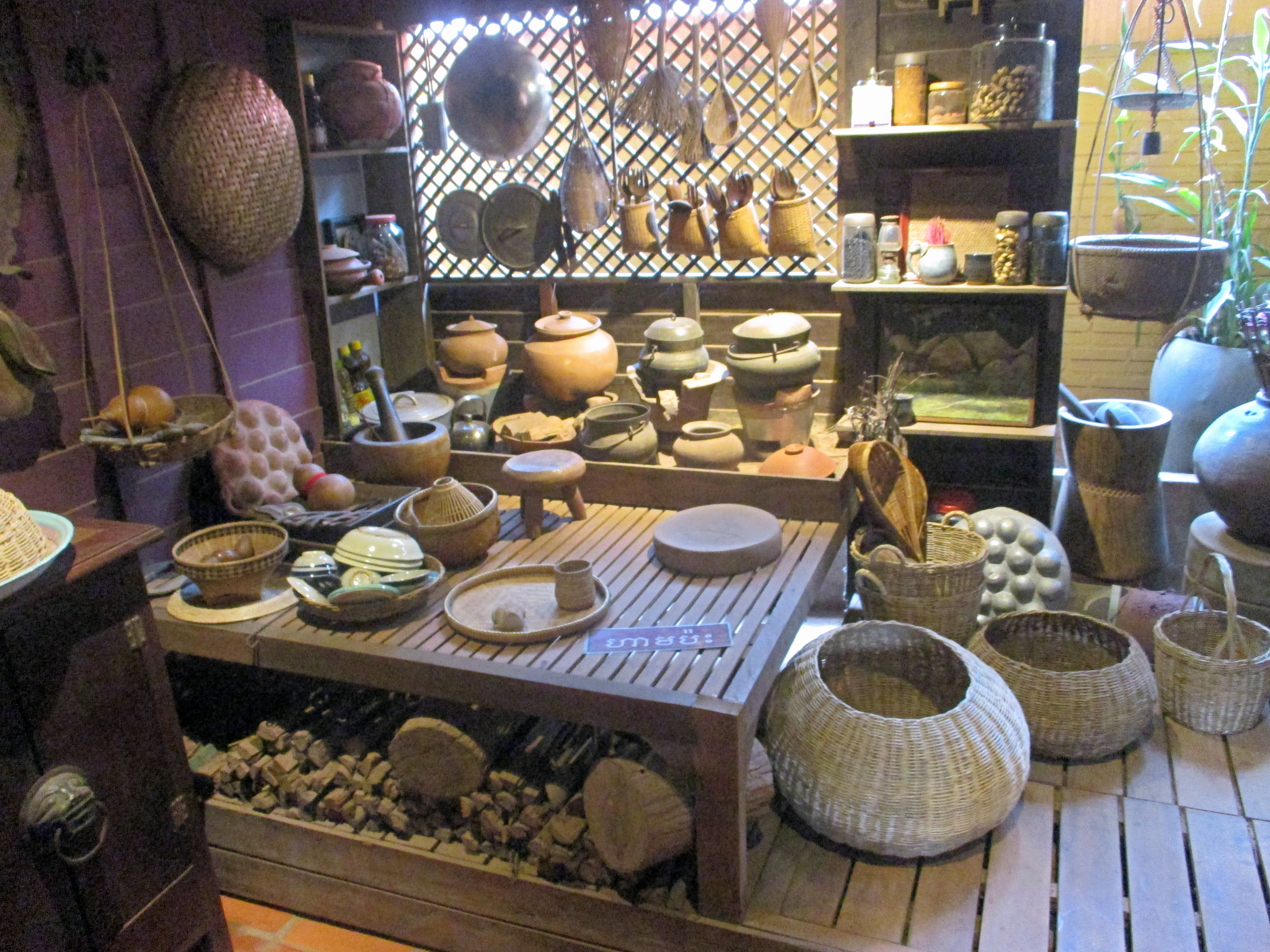
The interior of a traditional Khmer kitchen

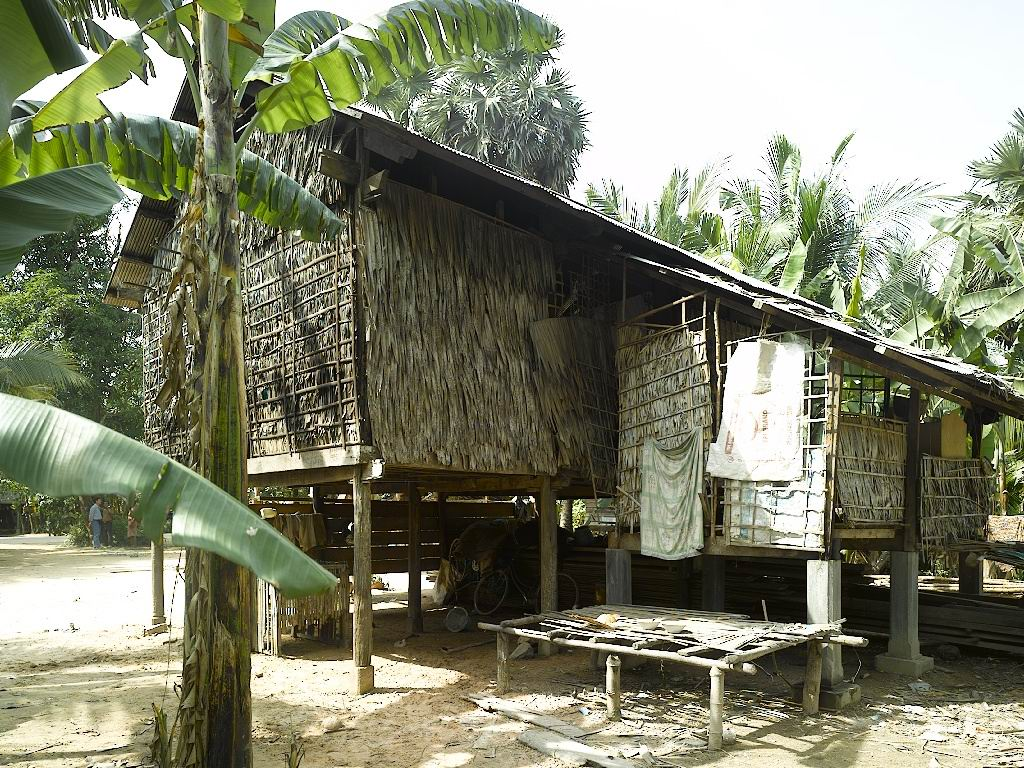
A rural Khmer house kitchen

In the Khmer Empire, kitchens earthenware pots were used to cook rice, and sometimes an earthenware stove was used to make sauces. Hearths were formed by burying three stones in the ground and ladles were made from coconut shells. Pottery dishes imported from China or copperware were used for serving rice, while sauce containers were made from leaves. Chiao leaves were also used to make single use spoons for carrying liquid to the mouth.

The south wall of the 12th/13th century Bayon temple depicts a Khmer kitchen, including its utensils, many of which are still used throughout modern Cambodia. According to local folklore, the 12th century Wat Athvea once housed an Angkorean-era royal open-air kitchen. They describe the temple's loose fallen stones as kraya cham-en meaning "the preparation of the royal meal" and talk about once-standing brick stoves and a wall where meat, baskets of ingredients, and utensils were hung. However, French archaeologist Claude Jacques contends that there is no archaeological evidence of a surviving Khmer Empire kitchen from that period. He believes the Bayon temple’s bas-reliefs and the writings of the Chinese diplomat Zhou Daguan are the only surviving records of ancient Khmer kitchens.

Nowadays, Khmer rural kitchens are usually placed in an airy location, close, but separate from the main house to avoid smoke from firewood and undesirable odours from disturbing the main household. The most important Khmer kitchen utensils are:

- A mortar and pestle for making kroeung;
- A bamboo sieve for filtering prahok and ripe tamarind juice;
- Earthen stoves with varying heat intensity for cooking different dishes;
- A coconut grater;
- Earthen pots for cooking rice and soup, as well as storing water;
- Jars for storing prahok, kapi and other ingredients.
- Loose bamboo baskets for storing vegetables.

In many kitchens, aluminium pots have replaced earthenware. Utensils are usually hung on the walls of the kitchen for easier access. With frying adopted from the Chinese, frying pans are also often found in modern Khmer kitchens. Although usually not considered part of the kitchen utensils, some houses may also have a larger mortar for grinding rice, and flat round bamboo trays for separating husk from the grain.

== Ingredients ==
=== Rice ===
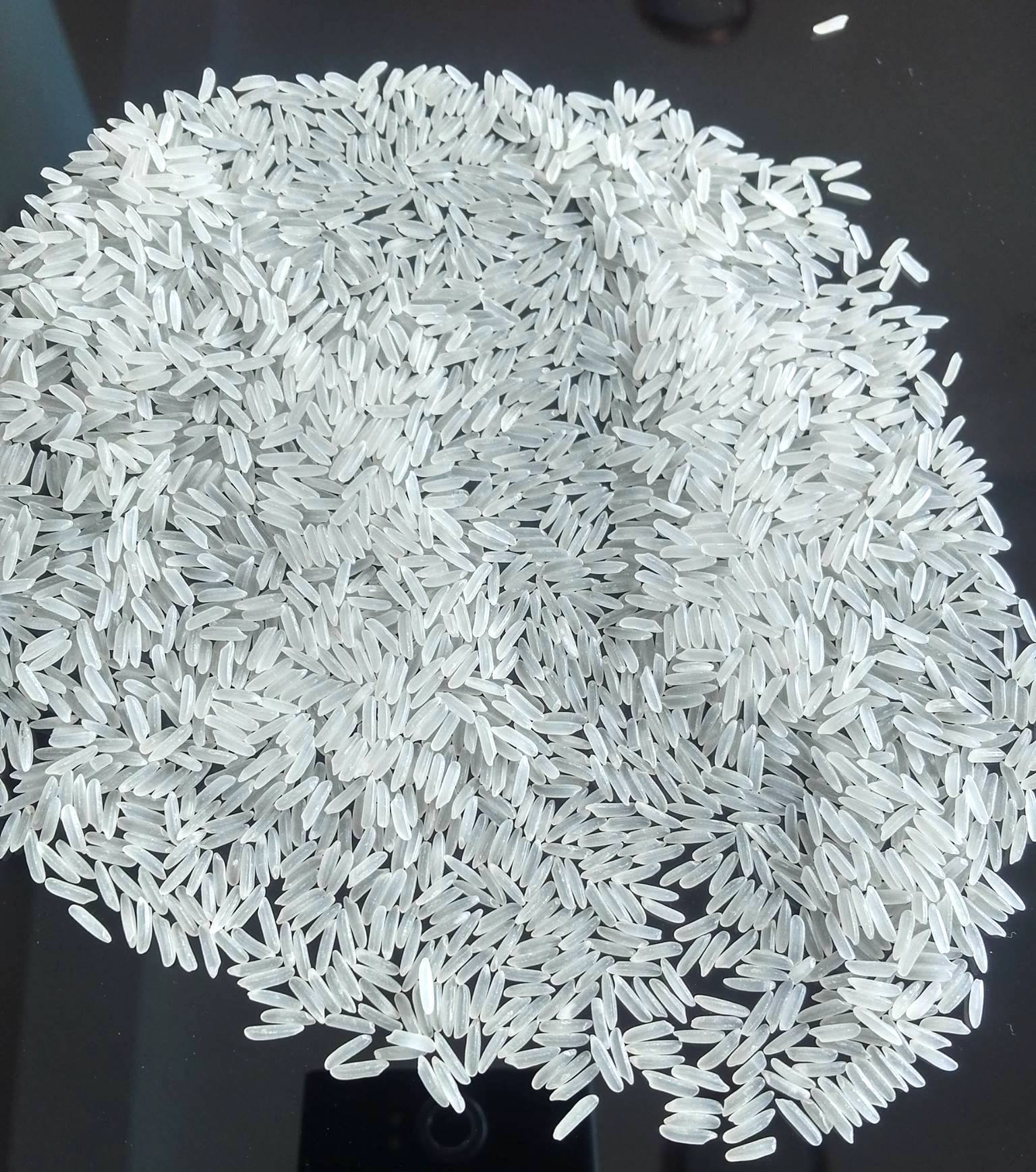
Cambodian aromatic long-grain (សែនក្រអូប, saen krâ’op) rice, one of the best paddy rice varieties of Cambodia

Because of Cambodia's geographic location, rice together with fish, especially freshwater fish, are the two most important sources of nutrients in the Cambodian diet. Rice is a staple food generally eaten at every meal.

Rice is believed to have been cultivated by the ancestors of the Khmers in the territory of Cambodia since 5,000 to 2,000 B.C. The advanced hydraulic engineering developed during the Khmer Empire allowed the Khmer to harvest rice and other crops three to four times a year. According to the International Rice Research Institute, there are approximately 2,000 rice varieties indigenous to Cambodia bred over the centuries by the Cambodian rice farmers. One of them – "Malys Angkor" (ម្លិះអង្គរ, Mlih Ángkô) – has been regarded as the world's best rice.

=== Fermented sauces ===
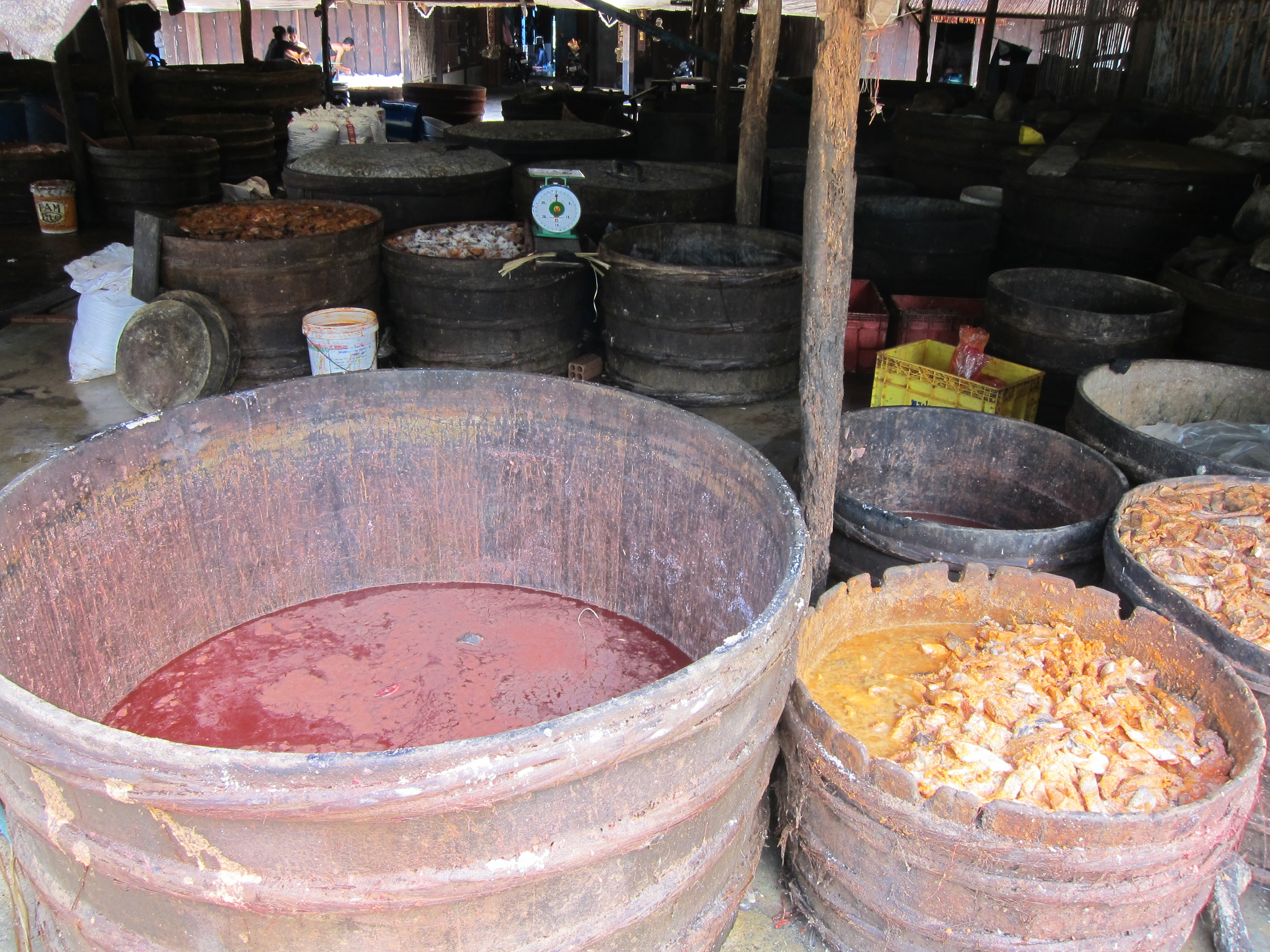
Metal containers with fermented seafood (mam) at the Prahok market (Psah Prahok) in Battambang.

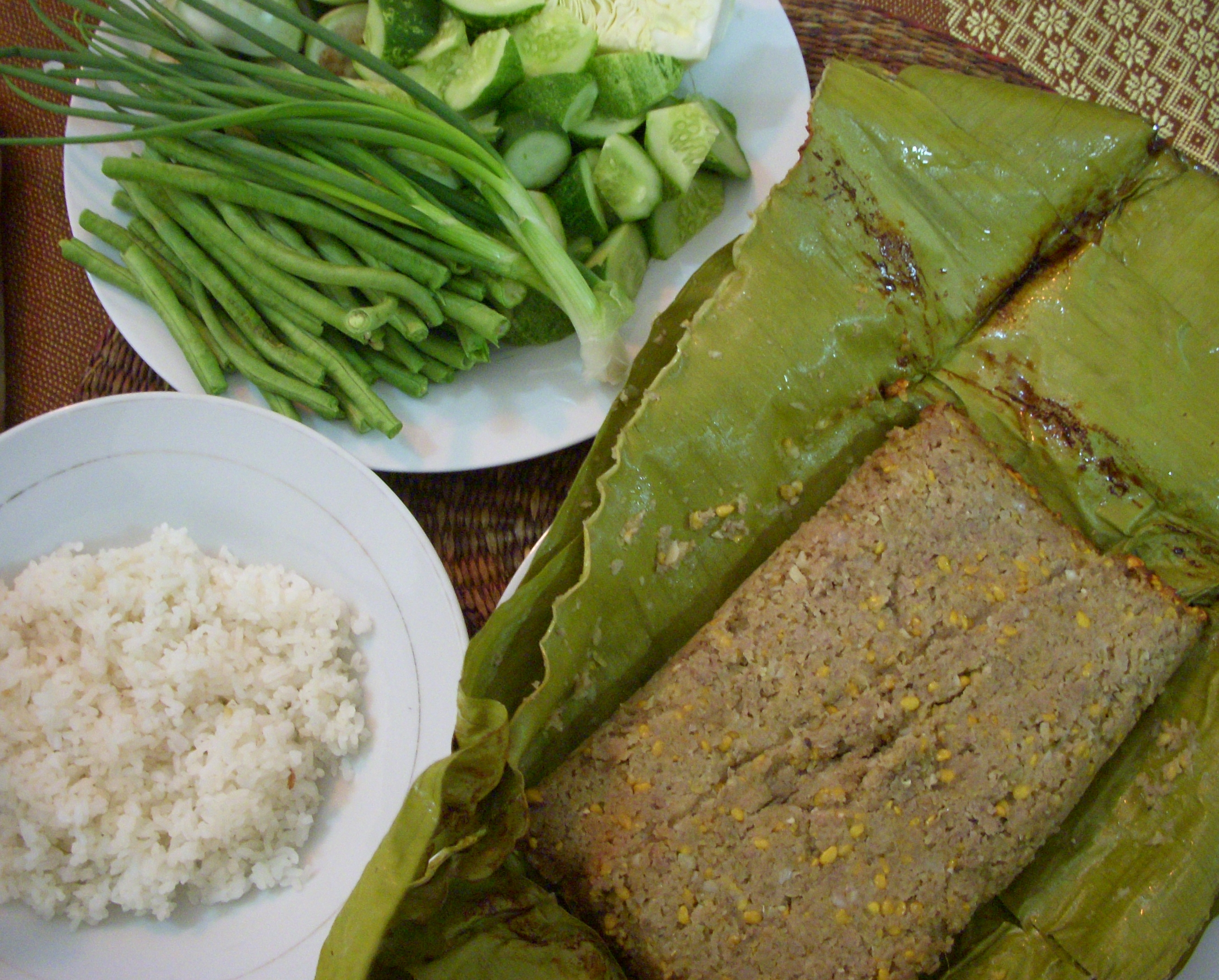
Prahok fried in banana leaves with steamed rice, yardlong beans, cucumbers, spring onions and Thai eggplants.

In Khmer, a distinction is made between fermented seafood depending on its consistency and the ingredient. Mam (មាំ) is the general term for seafood fermented with a special technique and usually includes more solid pieces of the fermented ingredient, whereas prahok (ប្រហុក, prâhŏk) and kapi (កាពិ, kapĭ) have more homogeneous consistency than mam.

Mam is prepared by adding a mixture of salt, roasted red sticky rice, and palm sugar to snakehead fillets and fermenting them for more than a year. The palm sugar and rice give mam an earthier and sweeter flavour and a reddish tone. Prahok, on the other hand, can either be made from small fish with all the bones and less salt (called prahok chhoeung) or large deboned fish and more salt (called prahok sach (ប្រហុកសាច់, prâhŏk săch)), which in turn can be made from larger fish (such as the striped snakehead (ត្រីរ៉ស់, troei răh) or smaller fish (such as troei kamplianh), with or without roe. Roe can be removed from the fish, cleaned, drained, and fermented separately. Kapi is made by pounding cleaned, dried, and salted shrimp into a homogeneous paste, sun-drying it for one day, pounding the paste again, sun-drying it for two more days, and pounding the paste for the final time to attain a viscous consistency.

Prahok is used as flavouring for almost every Khmer dish, mixed with rice or served as a dipping sauce (ទឹកជ្រលក់, toĕk chrôluăk). It can also be prepared into dishes of its own, such as prahok khtih (ប្រហុកខ្ទិះ, prâhŏk khtĭh), prahok kap (ប្រហុកកប់, prâhŏk kǎp), toek krueang, toek prahok prahok ang (ប្រហុកអាំង, prâhŏk ăng), and prahok chian (ប្រហុកចៀន, prâhŏk chian). Fermented roe (ពងត្រី, pông troei) is primarily eaten with steamed eggs, omelettes, and other hen or duck egg dishes. Kapi is often mixed with sugar, garlic, lime juice, chili, and crushed peanuts and used as a dipping sauce for vegetables, fruit, meat, and fish.

Other sauces used in the Cambodian cuisine include fish sauce (ទឹកត្រី, toĕk troei), oyster sauce (ទឹកប្រេងខ្យង, toĕk preng khyâng), soy sauce (ទឹកស៊ីអ៊ីវ, toĕk si-iw; តៅអ៊ីវ, tau iw; សាអ៊ីវ, sa-iw or ស៊ីអ៊ីវ, si-iw), tamarind sauce (ទឹកអម្ពិល, toĕk ǎmpĭl) and hoisin sauce (ទឹកសៀង, toĕk siang). In particular, Kampot is known for its distinctive variety of fish sauce, made from locally sourced anchovies and valued for its rich, complex flavor.Fish sauce is an important ingredient in Khmer cooking, used to add saltiness to soups and noodle dishes, marinate meats, or as a dipping sauce for fish. Mixed with ingredients, such as garlic, ginger, and lime juice, it is used as a sauce for spring rolls, salads, and noodles. Oyster sauce was introduced by Chinese immigrants and has become a common ingredient in Cambodian cooking used to add a tangy-sweet flavour to meats and stir-fried vegetables. Oyster sauce, along with fish sauce and soy sauce, is commonly used together when seasoning foods. Soy sauce is also a common ingredient and condiment, mixed with garlic or aged radish to be eaten with primarily high-protein dishes, as well as used to add saltiness when fish sauce is not used. Tamarind sauce is made from tamarind paste mixed with fish sauce, garlic, chili peppers, lime juice, palm sugar, and vinegar.

=== Herbs and spices ===
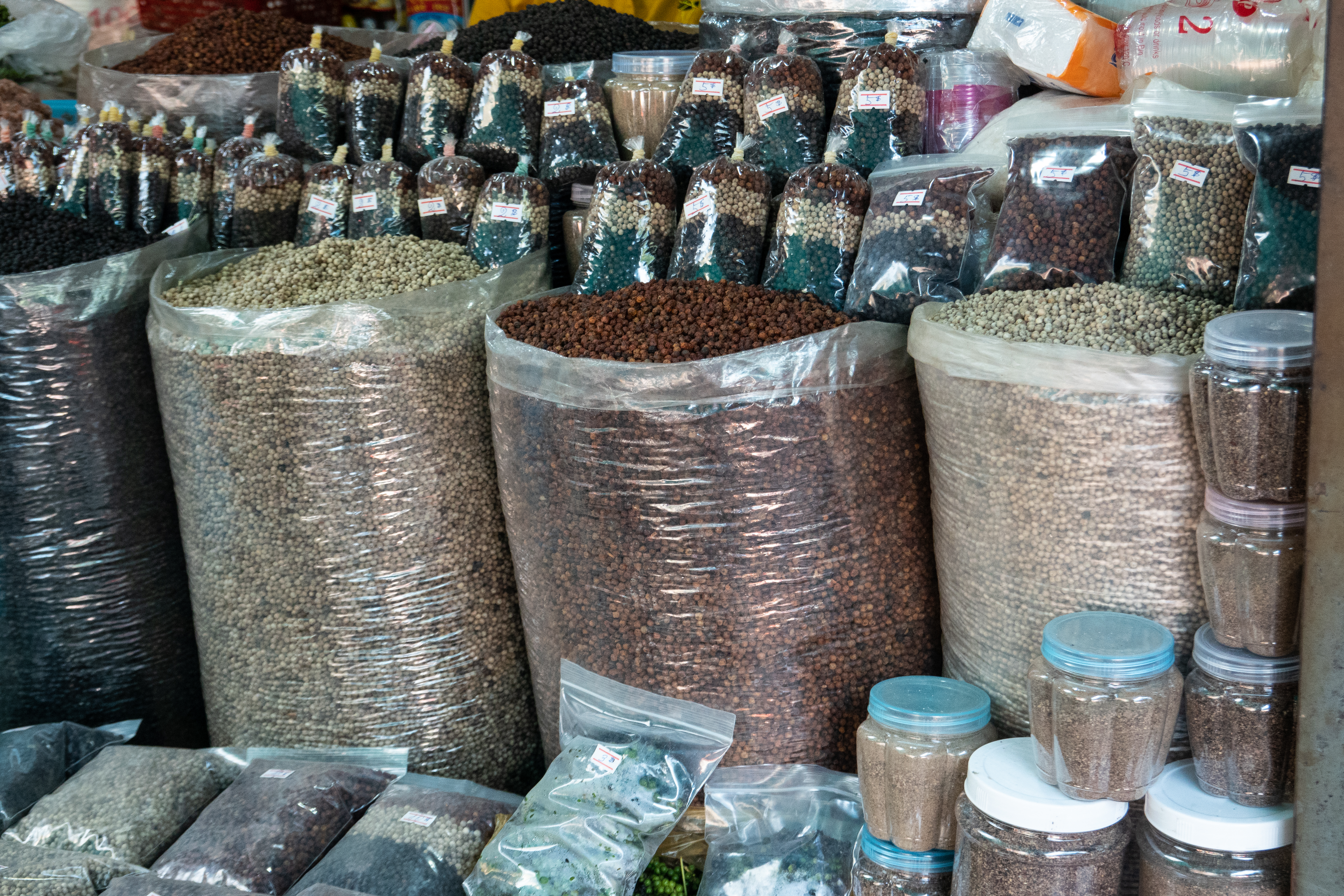
Black, white, red and green Kampot peppercorns for sale at the Kep Crab Market

The most common herbs and spices in Cambodian cuisine are sweet basil (ជីរនាងវង, chi niang wǒng), coriander (ជីរវ៉ាន់ស៊ុយ, chi wăn sŭy), hot mint (ជីរពងទាកូន, chi pông tia kon), turmeric (រមៀត, rômiĕt), garlic, ginger (ខ្ញី, khnhoei), galangal (រំដេង, rŏmdeng), kaffir lime leaves (ស្លឹកក្រូចសើច, sloĕk kroch saoech), neem leaves (ស្លឹកស្ដៅ, sloĕk sdau), peppermint (ជីរអង្កាម, chi ǎngkam), lemongrass (ស្លឹកគ្រៃ, sloĕk krei), chives (គូឆាយ, kuchhay), scallions, saw leaf herb (ជីរបន្លា, chi bǎnla), fingerroot (ខ្ខ្ជាយ, khchiay), and rice paddy herb.

Certain regions in Cambodia are known for their spices. Kampot pepper and Kampong Speu palm sugar (ស្ករត្នោតកំពង់ស្ពឺ, Skâ Tnaot Kǎmpǒng Spue) have been granted Geographical Indications in Cambodia and protected geographical indication in the European Union. Cardamom Mountains in Southwest Cambodia are famous for their large population of wild cardamom plants.

The cultivation of peppercorns in Cambodia dates back to at least the 13th century, and because of its "uniquely strong yet delicate aroma" and "slightly sweet eucalyptus taste," Kampot pepper is often regarded as the world's best pepper.

==== Kroeung ====
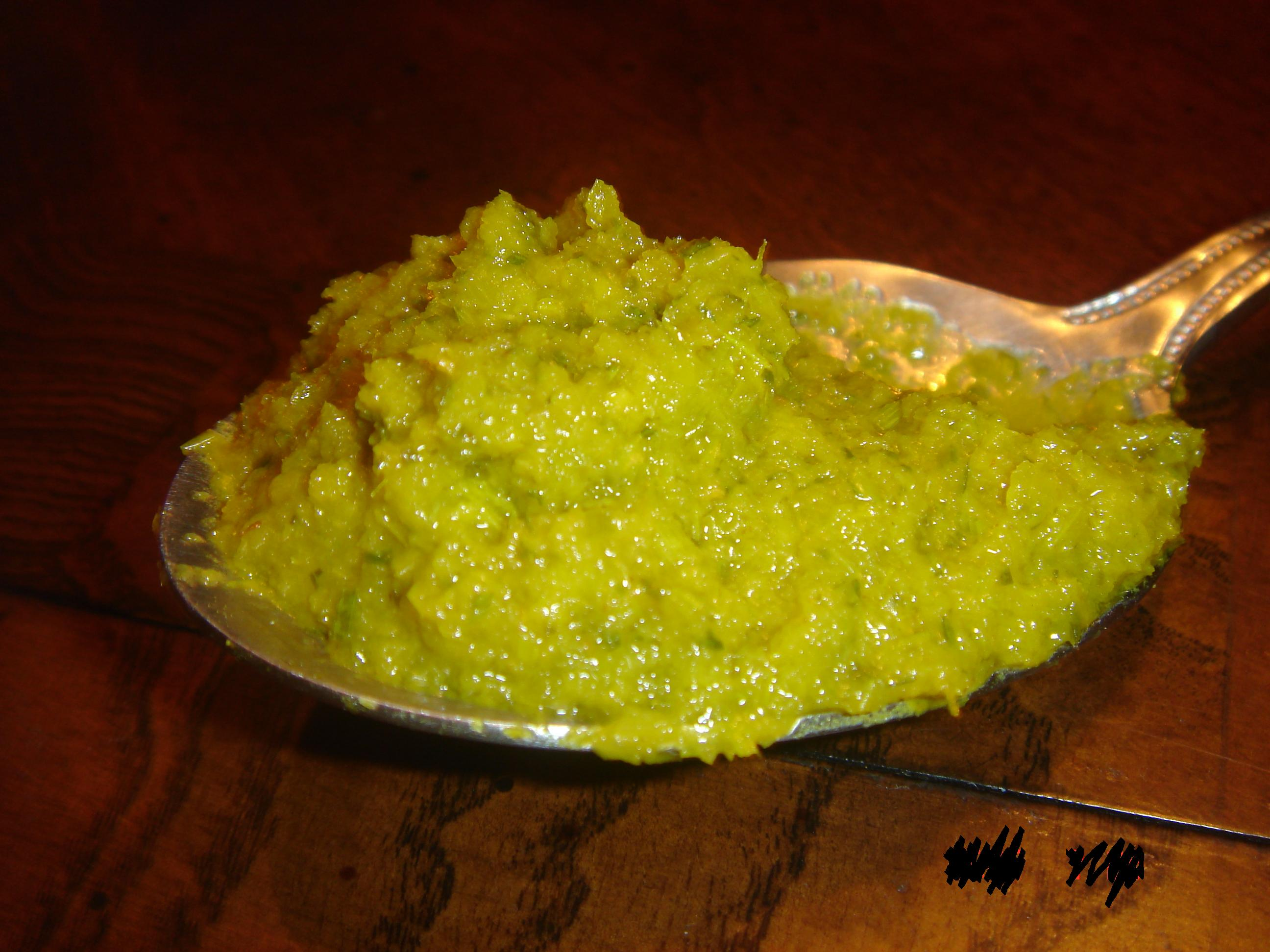
Green kroeung.

Kroeung (គ្រឿង, krueang [krɨəŋ] – 'ingredients') is a Khmer fresh flavouring paste commonly used in curries, soups, and stir-fries, one of the essential ingredients of Cambodian cuisine. The base of the paste consists of pounded lemongrass, galangal, garlic, shallots, kaffir lime leaves, and turmeric. There are five common types of kroeung: yellow kroeung (kroeung samlor m’chu), green kroeung (kroeung samlar kako), and red kroeung (kroeung samlor kari), as well as k’tis kroeung (kroeung samlor k’tis), and saraman kroeung (kroeung samlor saraman), each with different uses.

=== Vegetables ===
Vegetables are a major component in Cambodian cooking and the second highest quantity of foodstuff consumed after rice, making up 70–80% of a dish. The Cambodian diet consists heavily of leaf vegetables, such as water morning glory (ត្រកួន, trâkuan), cabbage (ស្ពៃក្តោប, spei kdaop), Chinese kale (ខាត់ណាចិន, khăt-na chĕn), betel (ស្លឹកម្លូ, mlu), vine spinach (វល្លិជន្លង់, woăl chǒnlǒng), and watercress (ច្រាច់, crac), which are used in soups, stir-fries (ឆា, chha), and salads.

Cambodian cuisine also uses different squashes, such as bitter melon (ម្រះ, mreăh), winter melon (ផ្លែត្រឡាច, phlae trâlach), kabocha, and luffa (ននោង, nônong); root vegetables, such as carrots (ការ៉ុត, karŏt), cassava (ក្ដួច, kduach), lotus rhizomes (ឫសឈូក, roĕh chhuk), potatoes (ដំឡូង, dǎmlong), radish (រ៉ាឌី, radi), sweet potatoes (ដំឡូងជ្វា, dǎmlong chwia), and jicama (ដំឡូងរលួស, dǎmlong rôluah or ប៉ិកួៈ, pĕkuak); and other vegetables, such as cucumbers (ត្រសក់, trâsǎk), eggplants (ត្រប់, trǎp), tomatoes (ប៉េងប៉ោះ, pengpǎh), cauliflower (ផ្កាខាត់ណា, phka khăt-na), chayotes (ផ្លែស៊ូ, phlae su), shallots (ខ្ទឹមក្រហម, khtoĕm krâhâm), yardlong beans (សណ្ដែកកួរ, sǎndaek kua), and maize (ពោត, pot). Many unripe fruits, such as papaya, green banana, and mango, are also used as vegetables.

=== Fruits ===
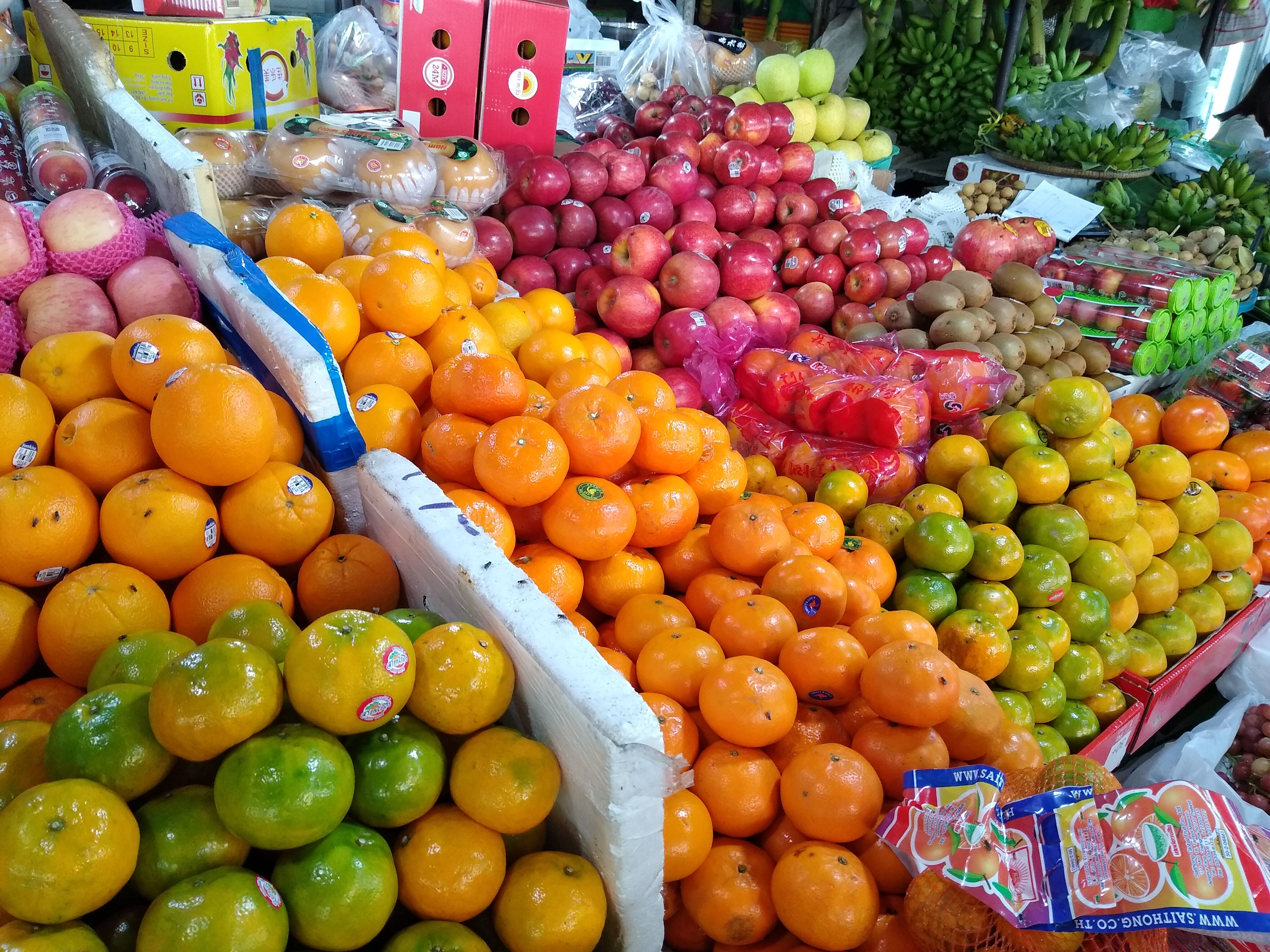
A Cambodian fruit vendor at the Central Market selling pomelos, oranges, apples, kiwifruit and sugar bananas

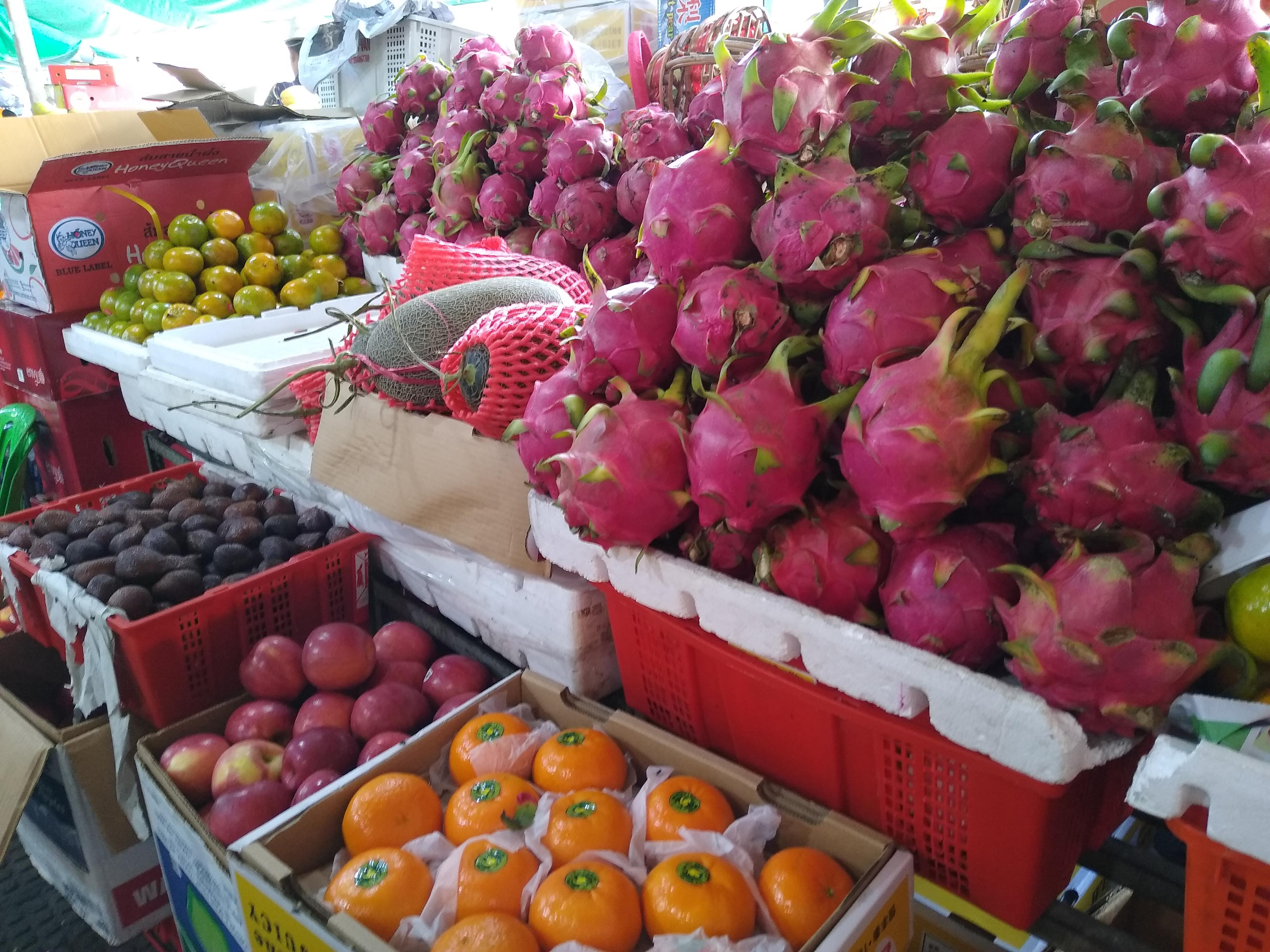
A Cambodian fruit vendor at the Central Market selling dragon fruit, persimmons, apples, winter melons, snake fruit and pomelos

Fruits in Cambodia are so popular that they have their own royal court. Durian (ទុរេន, tŭrén) is considered the "king", mangosteen the "queen", sapodilla (សាប៉ូឌីឡា) the "prince", and milk fruit (ផ្លែទឹកដោះគោ, phlê tœ̆k daôh ko) the "princess". Other popular fruit include kuy fruit (ផ្លែគុយ, phlê kŭy), romduol, pineapple (ម្នាស់, mnoăh), rose apple, jackfruit (ផ្លែខ្នុរ; phlê khnŏl), papaya (ល្ហុង, lhŏng), watermelon (ឪឡឹក, âulœ̆k), banana (ចេក, chék), mango (ស្វាយ, svay), rambutan (សាវម៉ាវ, sav mav), guava (ត្របែក, trɑbaek), longan (មៀន, miĕn), and tamarind (អម្ពិល, âmpĭl).

Although fruits are usually considered desserts, some, such as ripe mangoes, watermelon, and pineapples, are commonly eaten with heavily salted fish with plain rice. Fruits are also made into smoothies (ទឹកក្រឡុក, tœ̆k krâlŏk). Popular fruits for smoothies are durian, mangos, and bananas. Sun-dried limes boiled in sugar and salt water are used in chicken and duck soups, sauces with fish, as well as beverages.

Since 2018, Koh Trong pomelos (ក្រូចថ្លុងកោះទ្រង, kroch thlŏng Kaôh Trông) are recognized as one of the geographical indications in Cambodia. Pomelos grown in the Kratié Province's Koh Trong commune are known for their sweeter taste and the absence of seeds after ripening.

=== Fish and meat ===
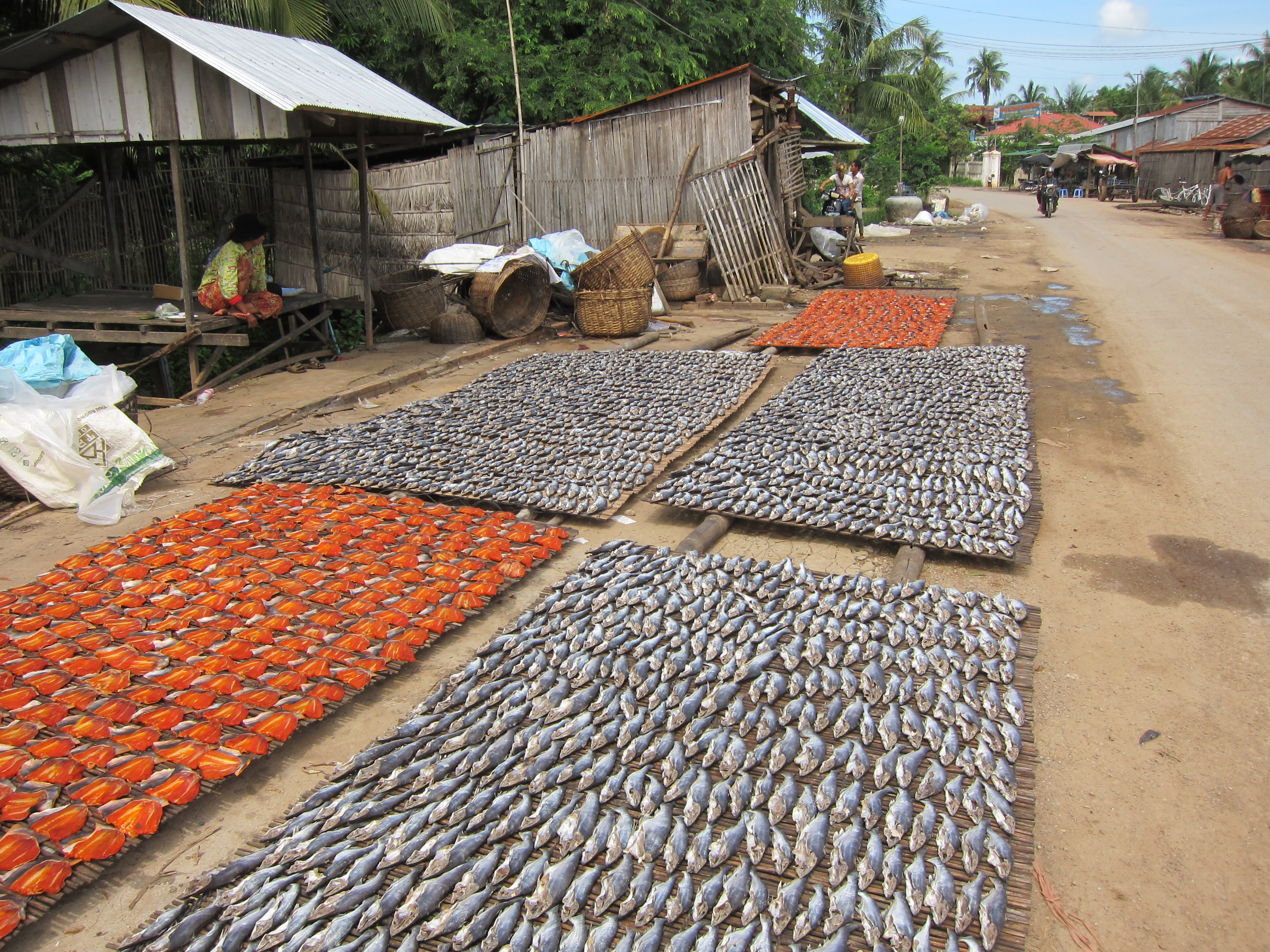
Sun-dried shark minnows and snakehead fish at the Prahok market (Psah Prahok) in Battambang

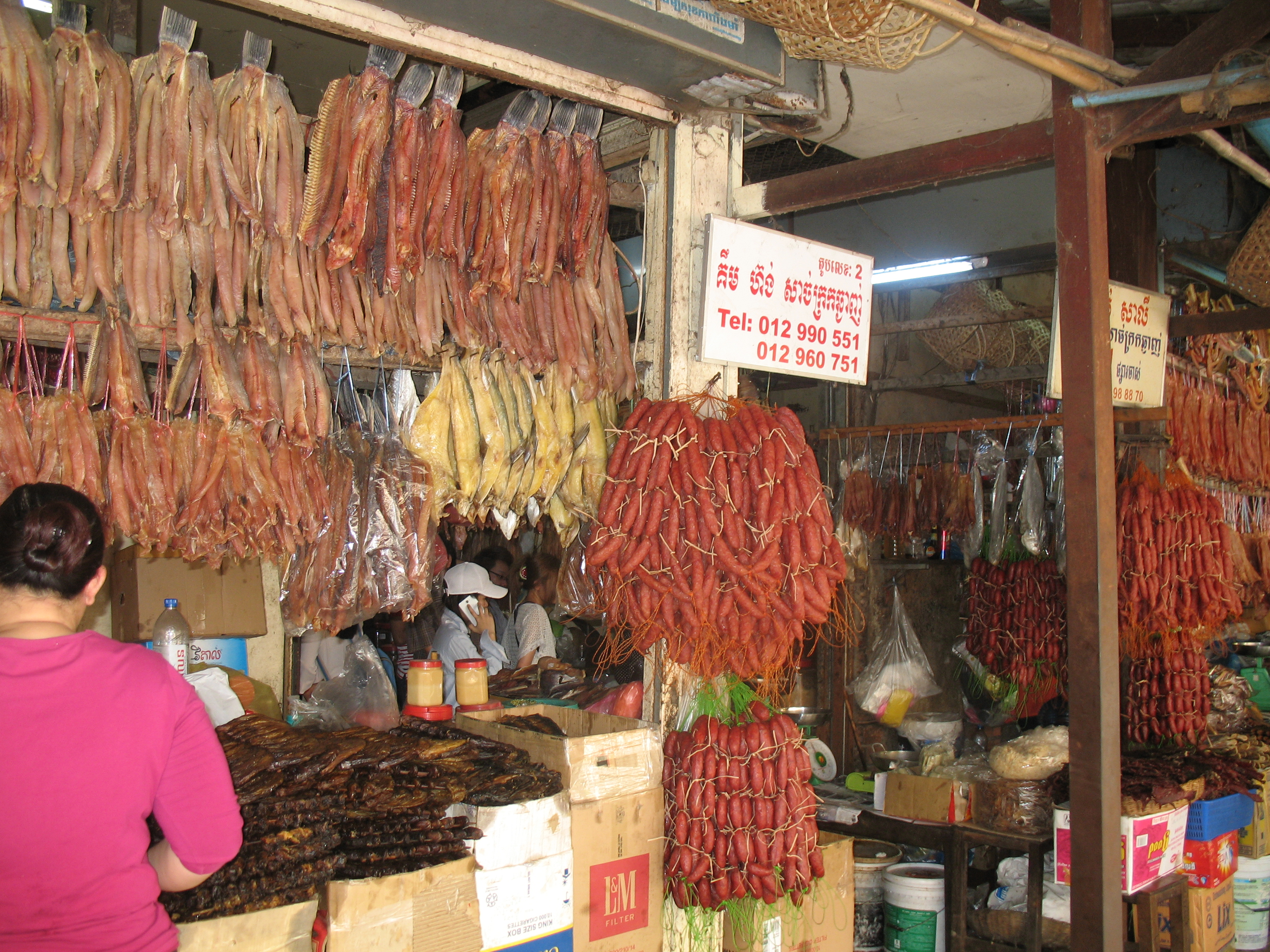
Dried fish and pork sausages for sale at the Old Market in Siem Reap

There are more than 900 different freshwater and saltwater fish species found in Cambodia. Approximately 475,000 tons of fish (ត្រី, trei) are caught in Cambodia every year, and a Cambodian annually consumes 63 kg of fish on average. They are fried, dried, smoked, and fermented into prahok and fish sauce. Fish and fish-based products are eaten two to three times a day. Popular fish are snakeheads, snappers, catfishes (ត្រី, trei chleang), and mackerels. Cambodian chef Luu Meng has estimated that approximately 40–50% of Cambodian dishes are made with fish.

In the late-13th-century Khmer Empire, cows were only used for pulling carts, and geese had been recently introduced by the Chinese sailors. Since the 1980s, the role of meat in the Cambodian diet has increased significantly, and nowadays the consumption of meat, such as beef (សាច់គោ, săch koo), pork (សាច់ជ្រូក, săch chruk), and poultry, has become common, especially in the capital region. In Siem Reap, ground pork or beef is made into spicy or sweet and savoury sausages (សាច់ក្រក, săch krɑɑk (pork); ខ្វាគោ, kwa koo (beef)) that are eaten with steamed white rice, congee, or baguettes.

Other seafood includes an array of shellfish such as crabs (ក្ដាម, kdaam), clams, cockles (ងាវ, ngiəw), crayfish (បង្កង, bang kang), shrimp, and squid (ត្រីមឹក, trei mik). Boiled or fried cockles seasoned with salt, chili, and garlic are sold as a popular street food. Giant freshwater prawns are usually only eaten by middle- and upper-class Cambodians because of their price. More unusual varieties of meat include frogs (កង្កែប, kɑngkaep; most commonly eaten are East Asian bullfrogs, rice field frogs, balloon frogs, banded bullfrogs, yellow frogs, and Asian common toads), turtles (អណ្ដើក, ɑndaək), and arthropods (such as tarantulas (សត្វអាពីង, sata ping), fire ants, grasshoppers (កណ្ដូប, kandoup), giant water bugs, and crickets (ចង្រិត, cɑngrət)). Crickets, water bugs, and tarantulas are seasoned with salt, sugar, and oil, deep-fried, and sold as street food.

=== Noodles ===
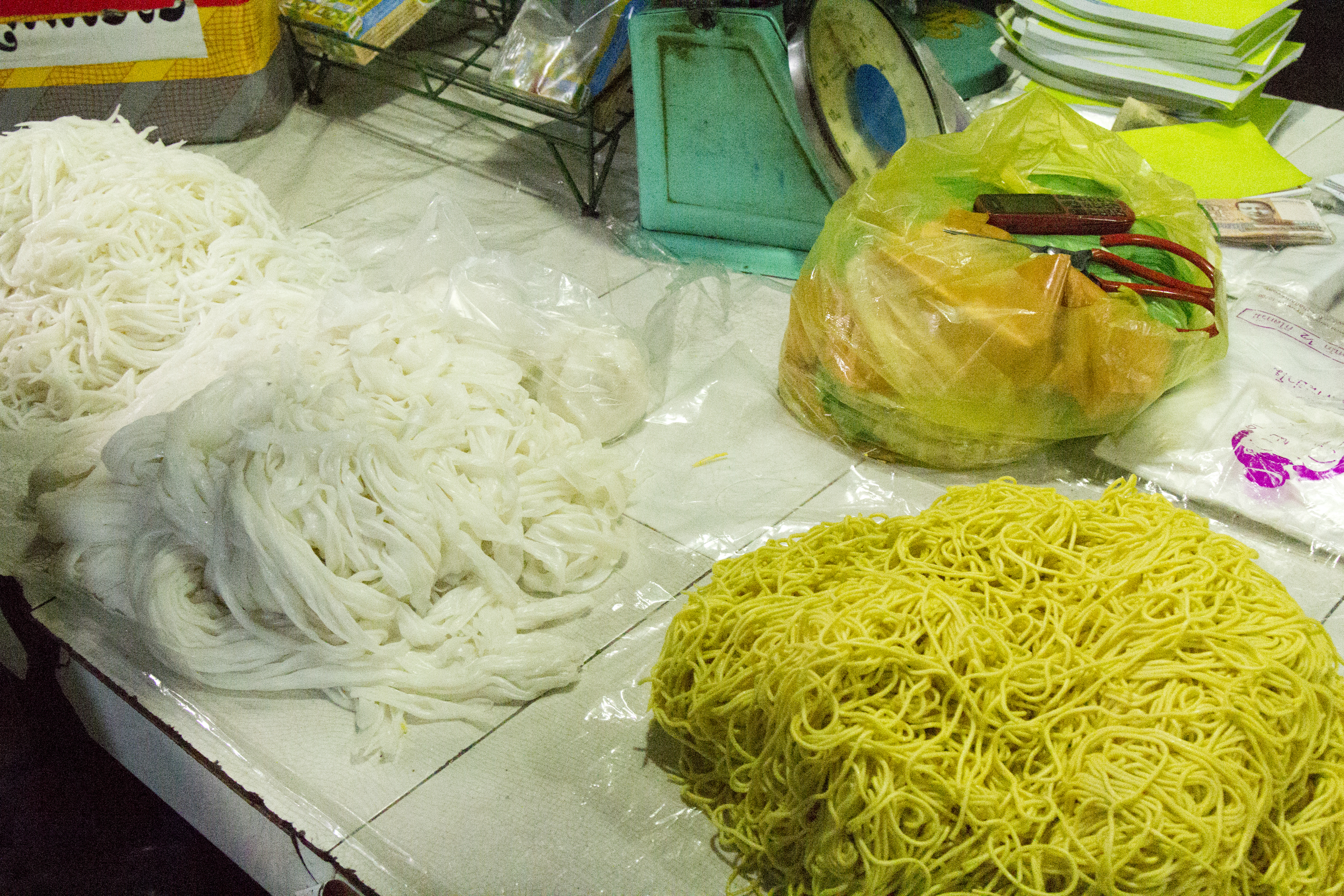
Cambodian rice and wheat noodles

Cambodian noodles are made out of rice, wheat, and tapioca flour (បាញ់កាញ់, bañ kañ) in varying thickness. Wheat noodles, such as the hand-pulled noodles (មី (mii), a loanword from Teochew 面) and the thinner wheat vermicelli (មីសួ, mii suə), have been adopted from the Chinese cuisine and incorporated into distinct Cambodian noodle soups and stir-fries. Rice noodles include the indigenous lightly fermented num banhchok (នំបញ្ចុក), as well as rice vermicelli (គុយទាវ, kŭytéav), banh sung (បាញ់ស៊ុង, bɑɲ song), silver needle noodles (លត, lat), and banh hoi (បាញ់ហយ).

== Food stalls ==
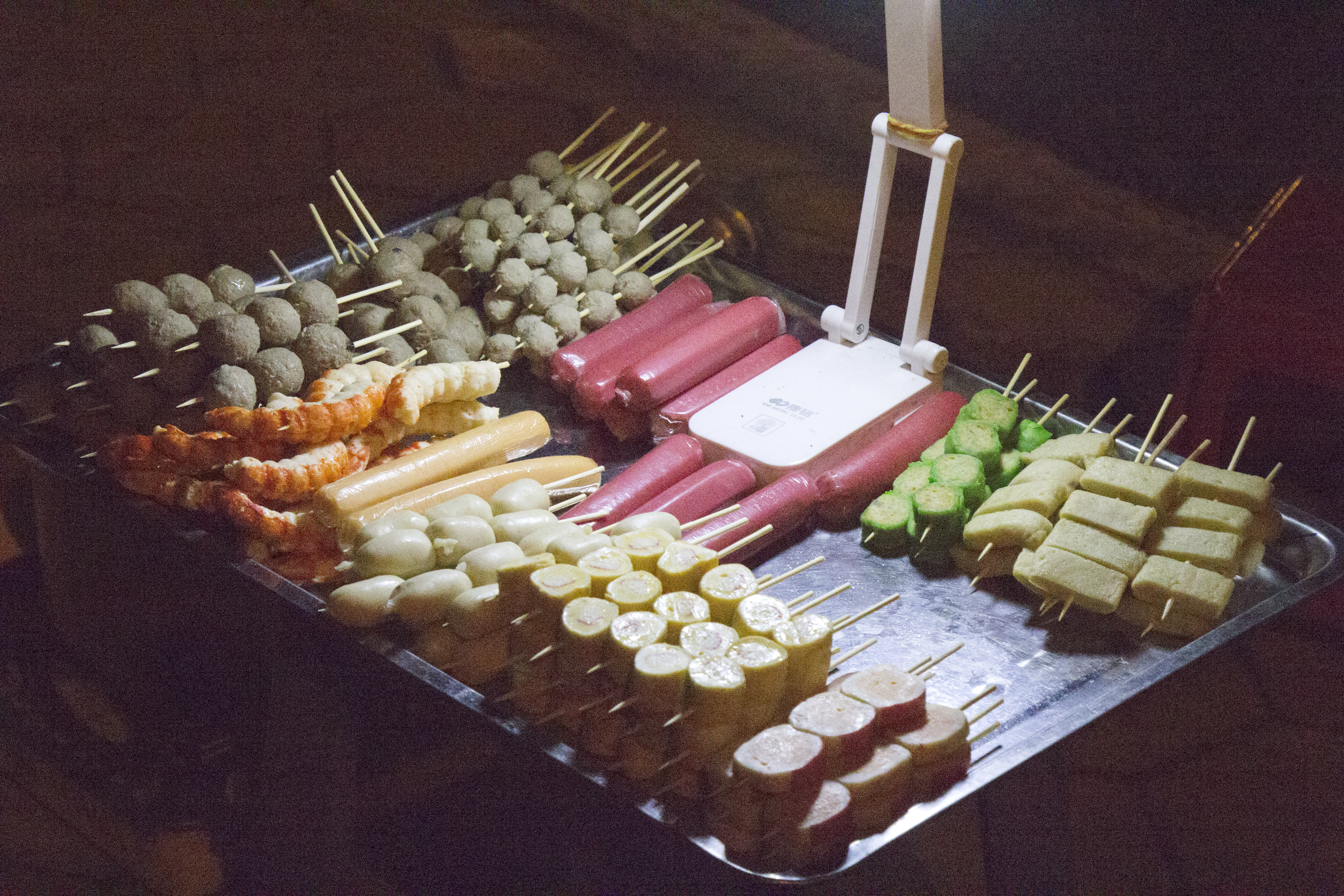
A Cambodian street food stall with different skewers

In Khmer, haan bai (ហាងបាយ lit. 'rice stall') is a generic term for food stalls serving both made-to-order and pre-prepared food (usually from large aluminum pots). In Phnom Penh, haan bai account for nearly four-fifths of all meals eaten outside the house, with pre-prepared food venues or soup-pot restaurants accounting for nearly three-quarters of meals eaten at a haan bai. Soup-pot restaurants are the most popular dining format among Cambodians and their popularity is inversely correlated with socioeconomic status.

The Khmer word haan (ហាង) is borrowed from Chinese háng ("store", "business"). More specifically, the stalls are referred to by the main food served—for example, rice noodle stalls (ហាងគុយទាវ, hang kŭytéav) or coffee stalls (ហាងកាហ្វេ, hang kafe).

== Dishes ==
=== Stews and curries ===
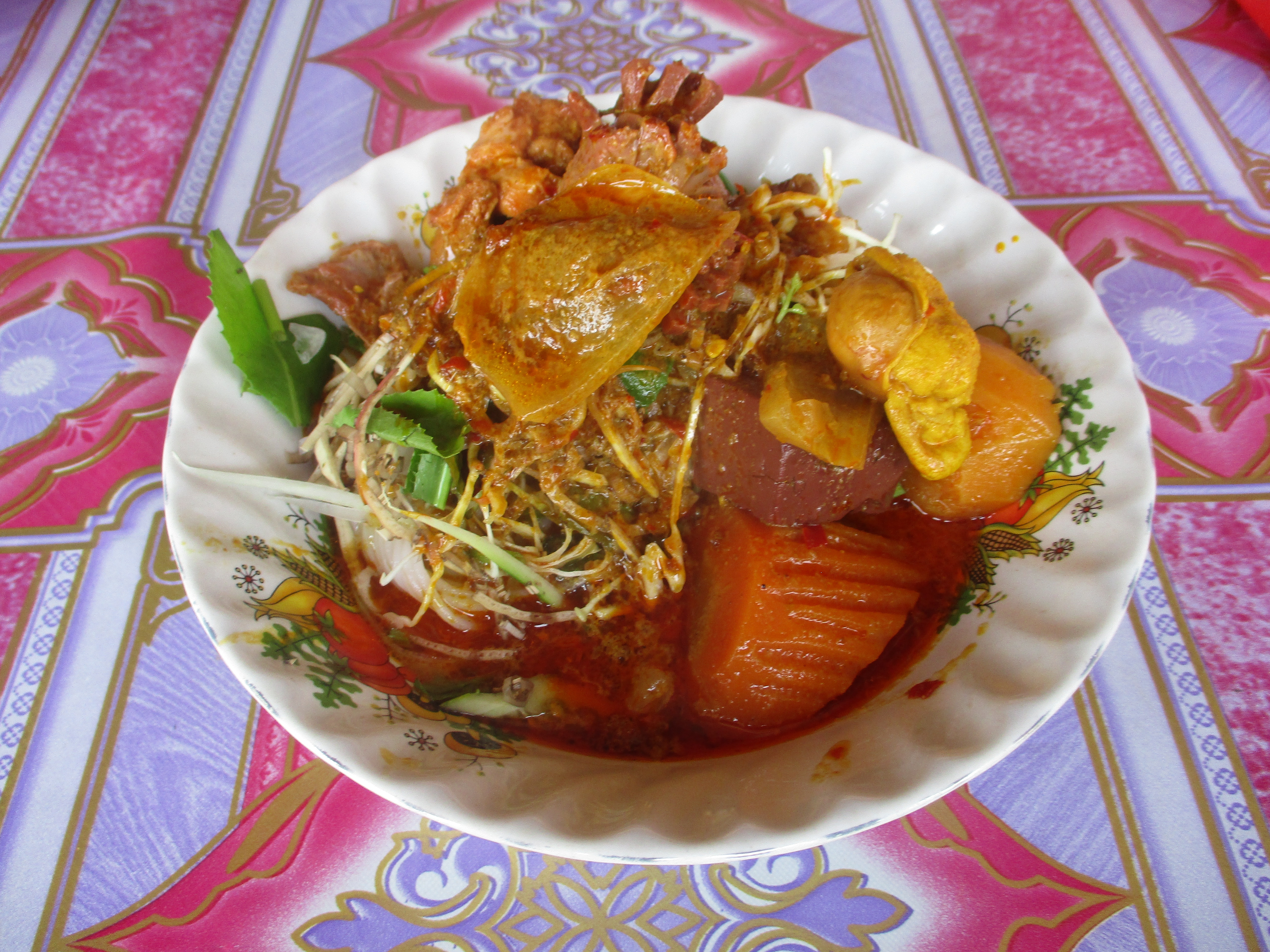
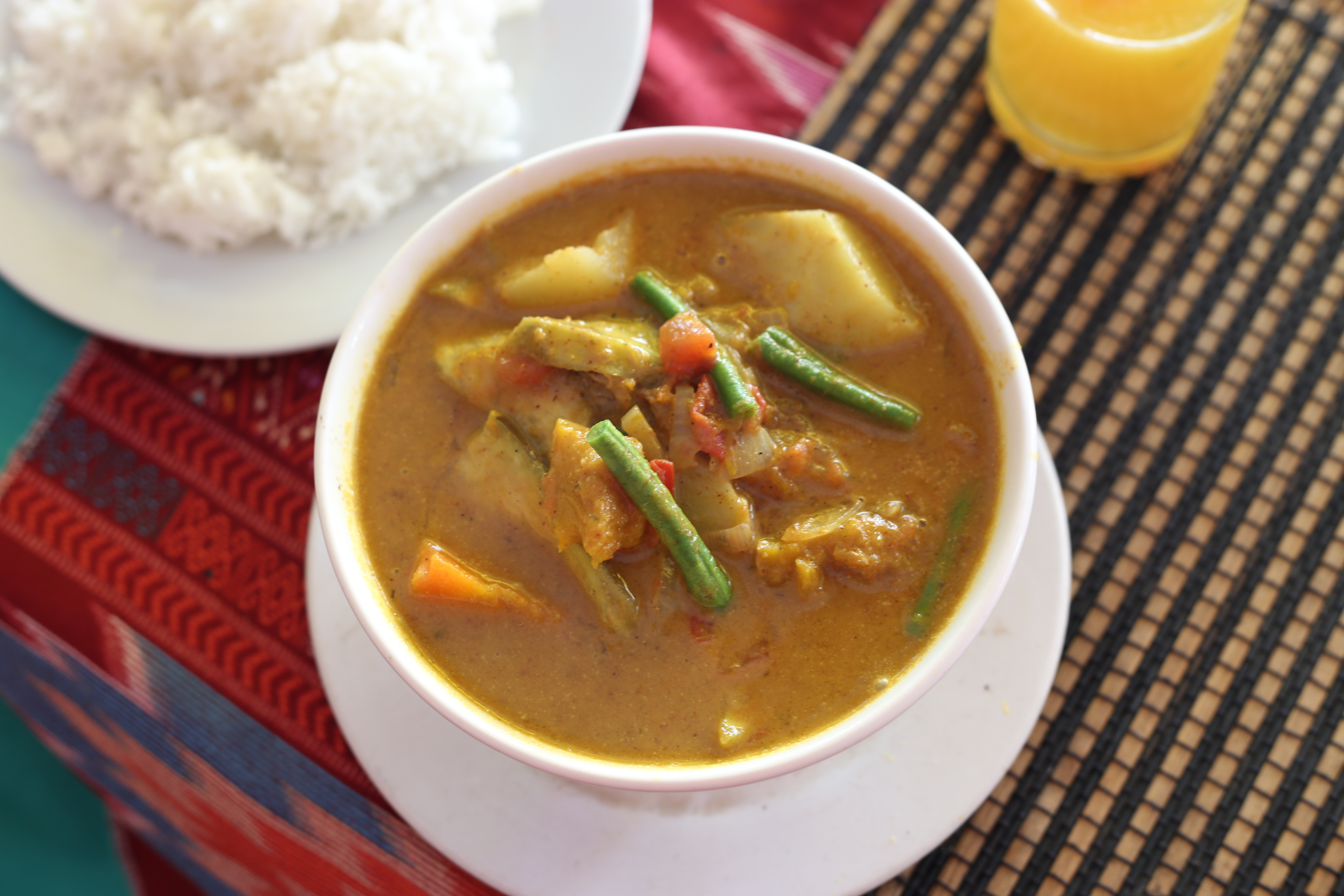
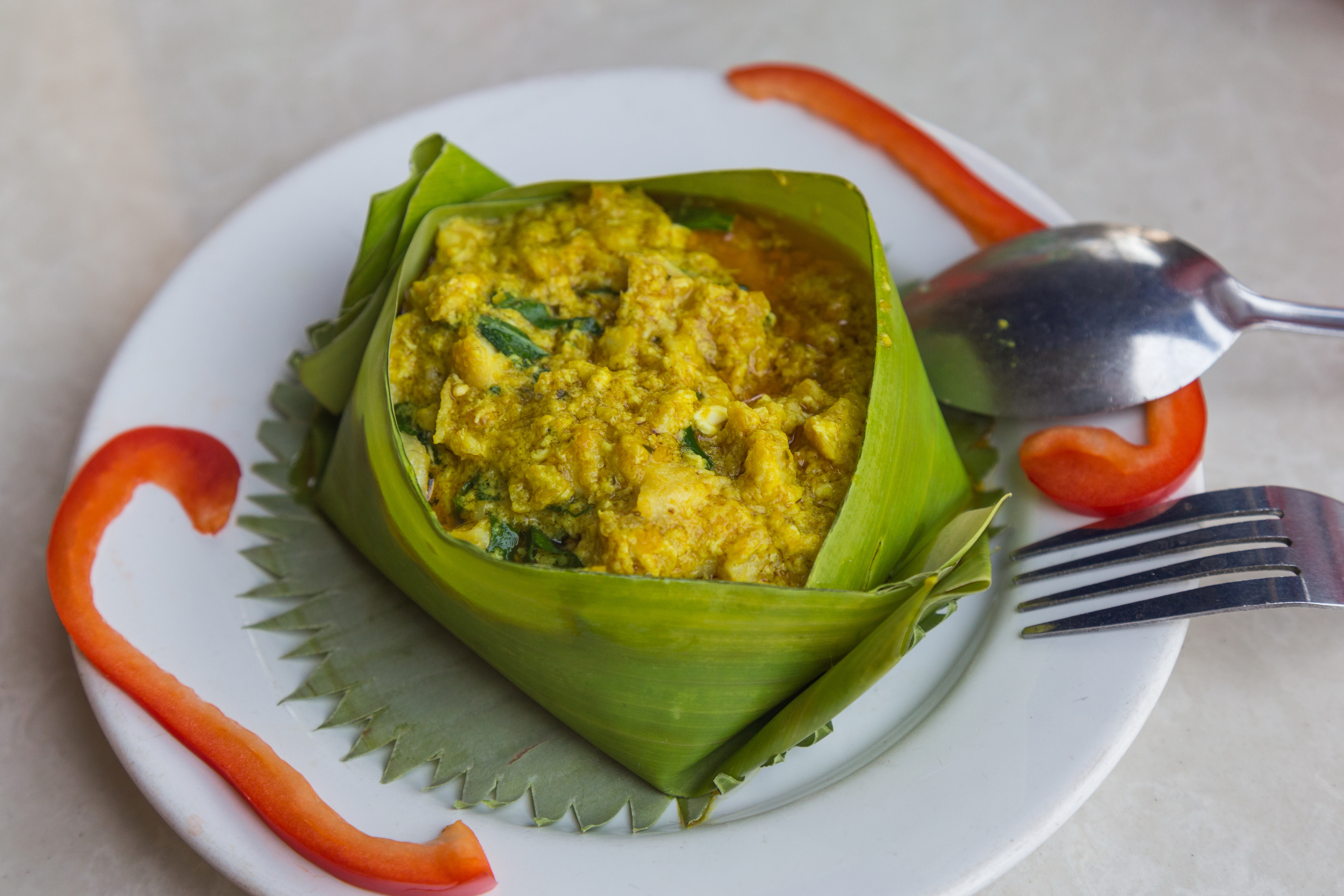
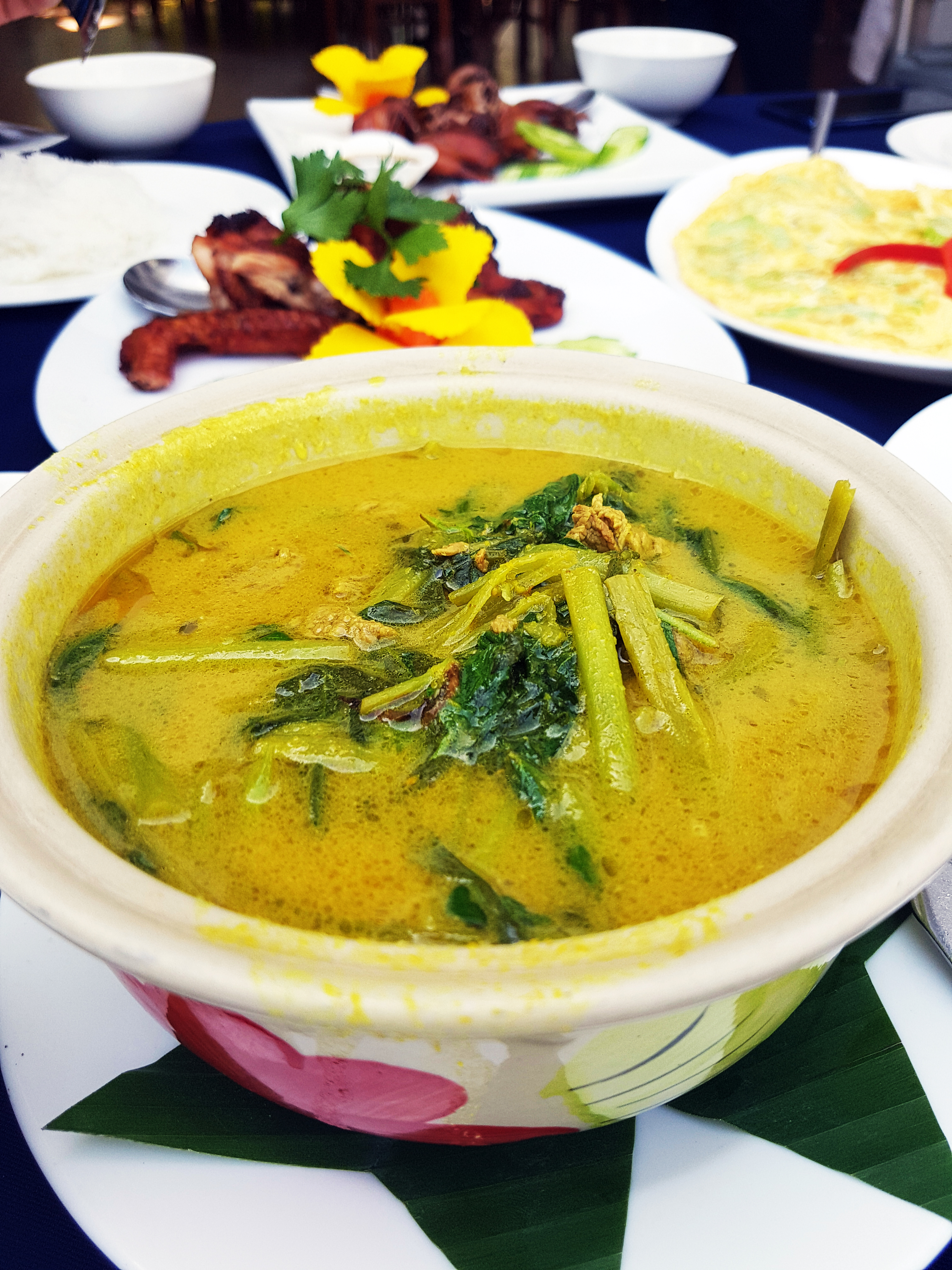
Cambodian curries: num banhchok samlor cari; kari sach moan; fish amok; samlor machu kroeung (clockwise from top left)

The Khmer term samlor (សម្ល) encompasses a wide variety of stews and curries, which are staples in Cambodian cuisine. These curries are typically served with rice, fresh noodles, or a baguette. and often include seafood, chicken, beef, or pork. Vegetarian Cambodian curries are less common. Popular Cambodian curries are fish amok, num banhchok, kari sach moan, sour beef curry and curry leaf chicken. The word kari (ការី, kari) specifically refers to an Indian-style curry and is believed to be a loanword from Tamil. Curries play an important role in ceremonial occasions in Cambodia and are distinctive for their use of sweet potatoes, setting them apart from other Asian curries.

=== Stir-fries ===
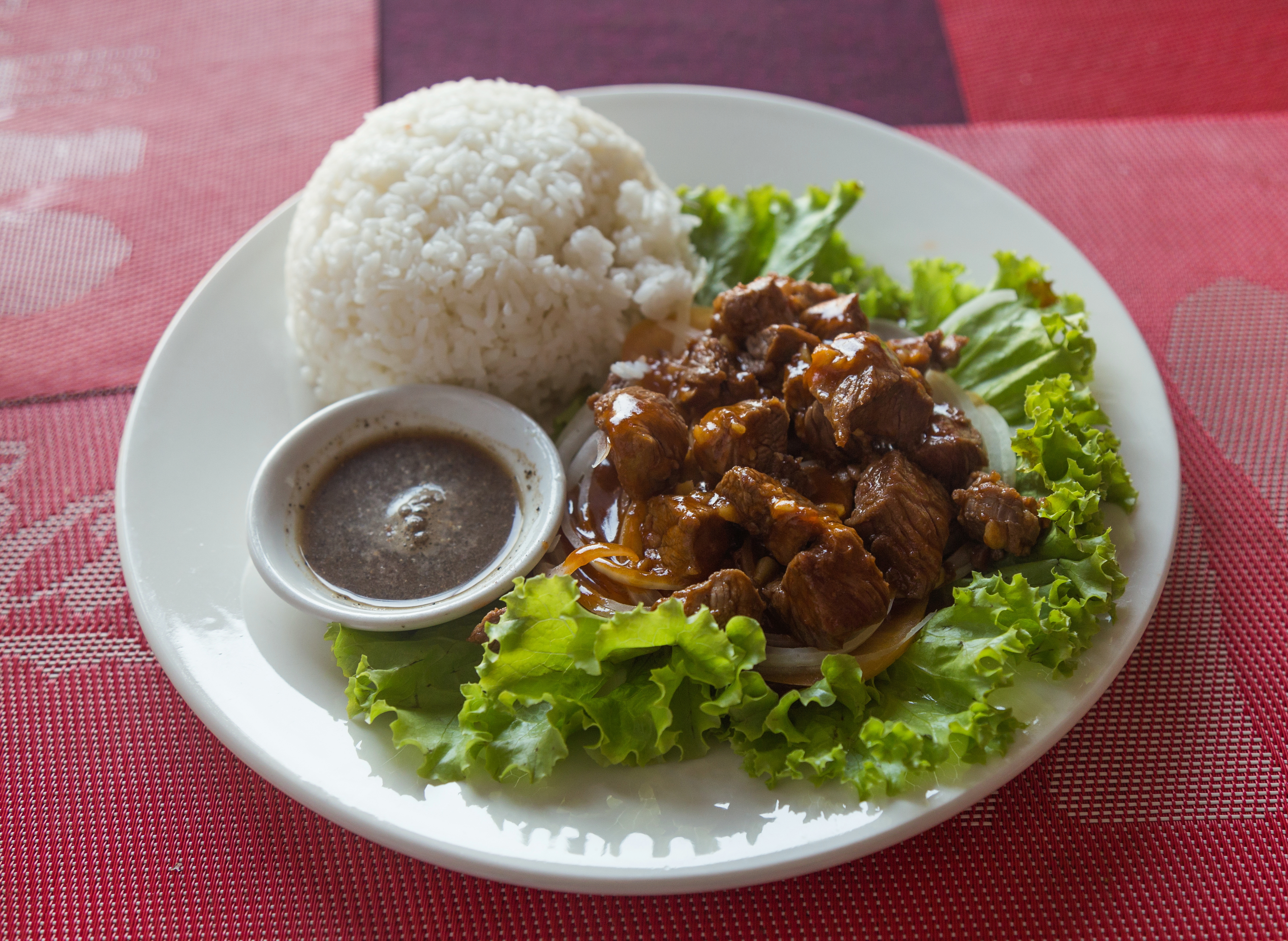
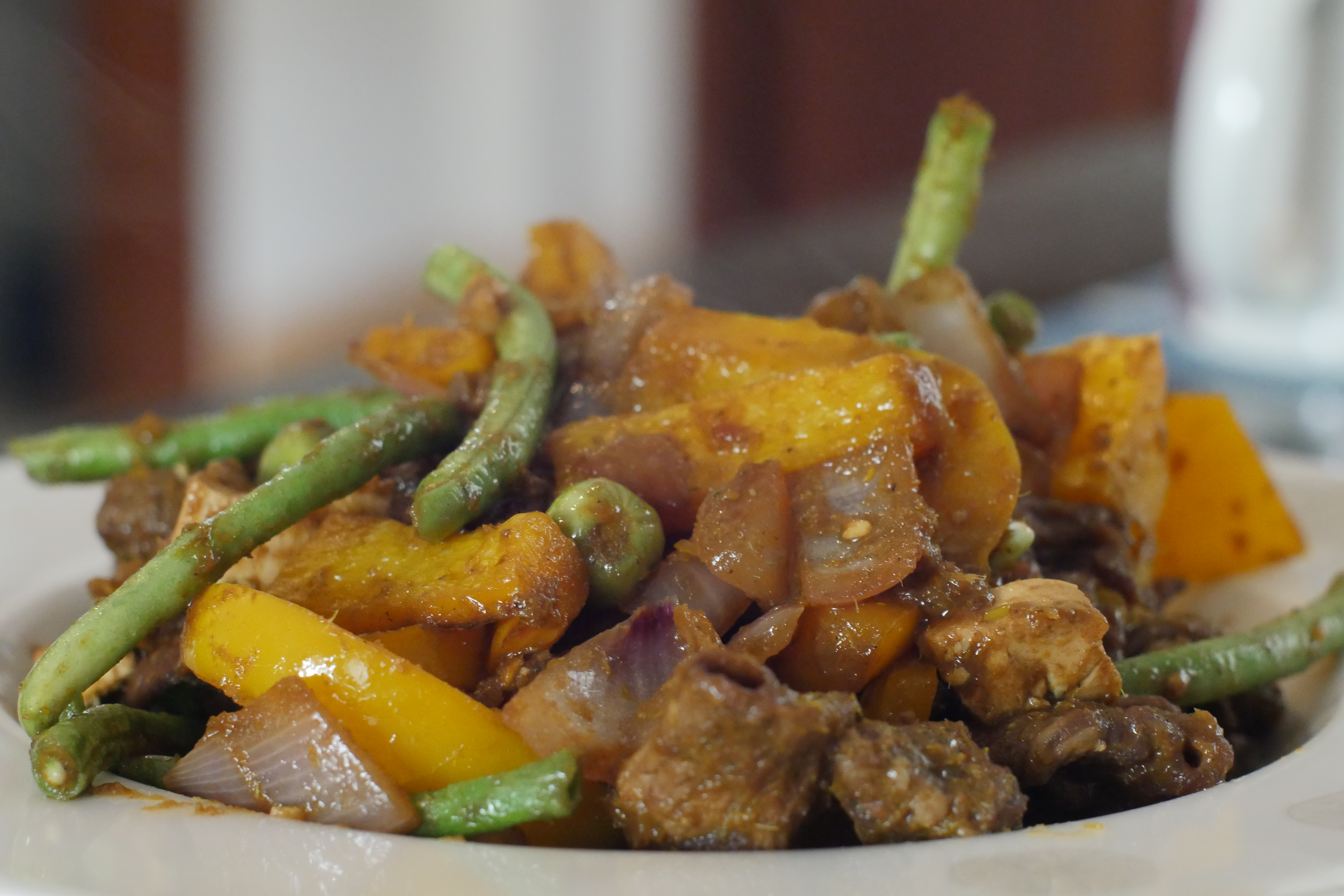
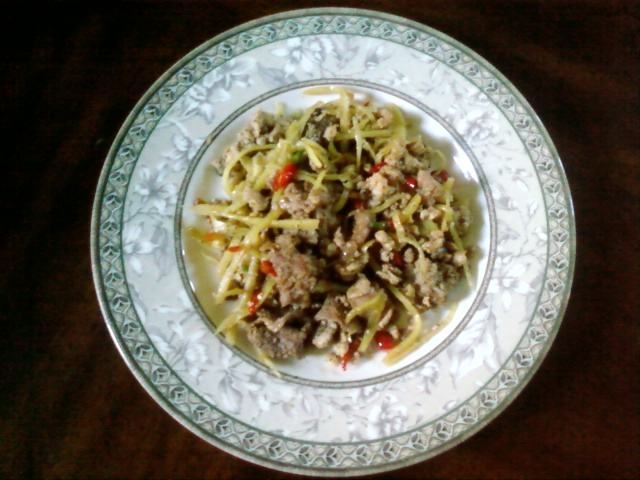
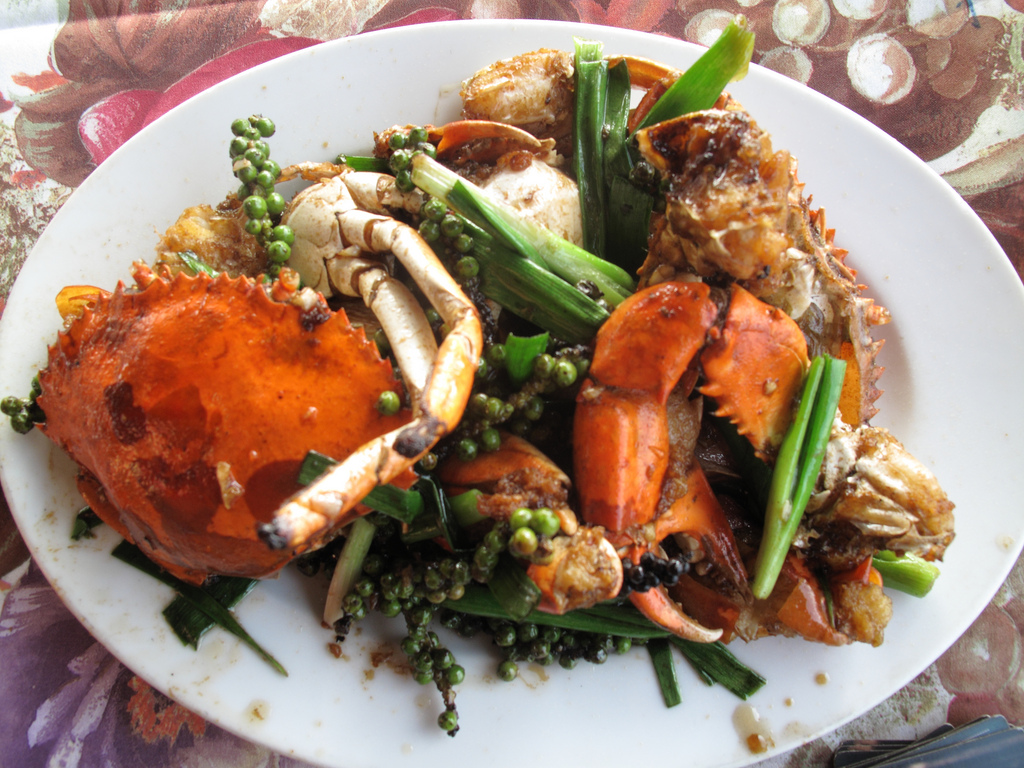
Cambodian stir-fry dishes: Beef lok lak; cha kroeung; chha kh'nhei; Kampot pepper crab (clockwise from top left)

Cambodian stir-fries combine aromatic ingredients with strong flavours, such as lemongrass, galangal, holy basil and garlic. An essential component of Cambodian stir-fry dishes is fish sauce and oyster sauce, which provide a pungent, umami-rich base, balanced by lime juice, palm sugar and other milder ingredients. The Khmer term cha (ឆា), borrowed from Chinese, refers to the method of sautéing or stir-frying, which has been integrated into Cambodian cuisine from Chinese cuisine and can be found as fried rice (បាយឆា, baay chaa) and fried noodles (មីឆា, mii chaa), among others. The Khmer verb kha (ខ), on the other hand, refers to the technique of stewing in soy sauce and could be ascribed to Vietnamese kho.

=== Salads ===
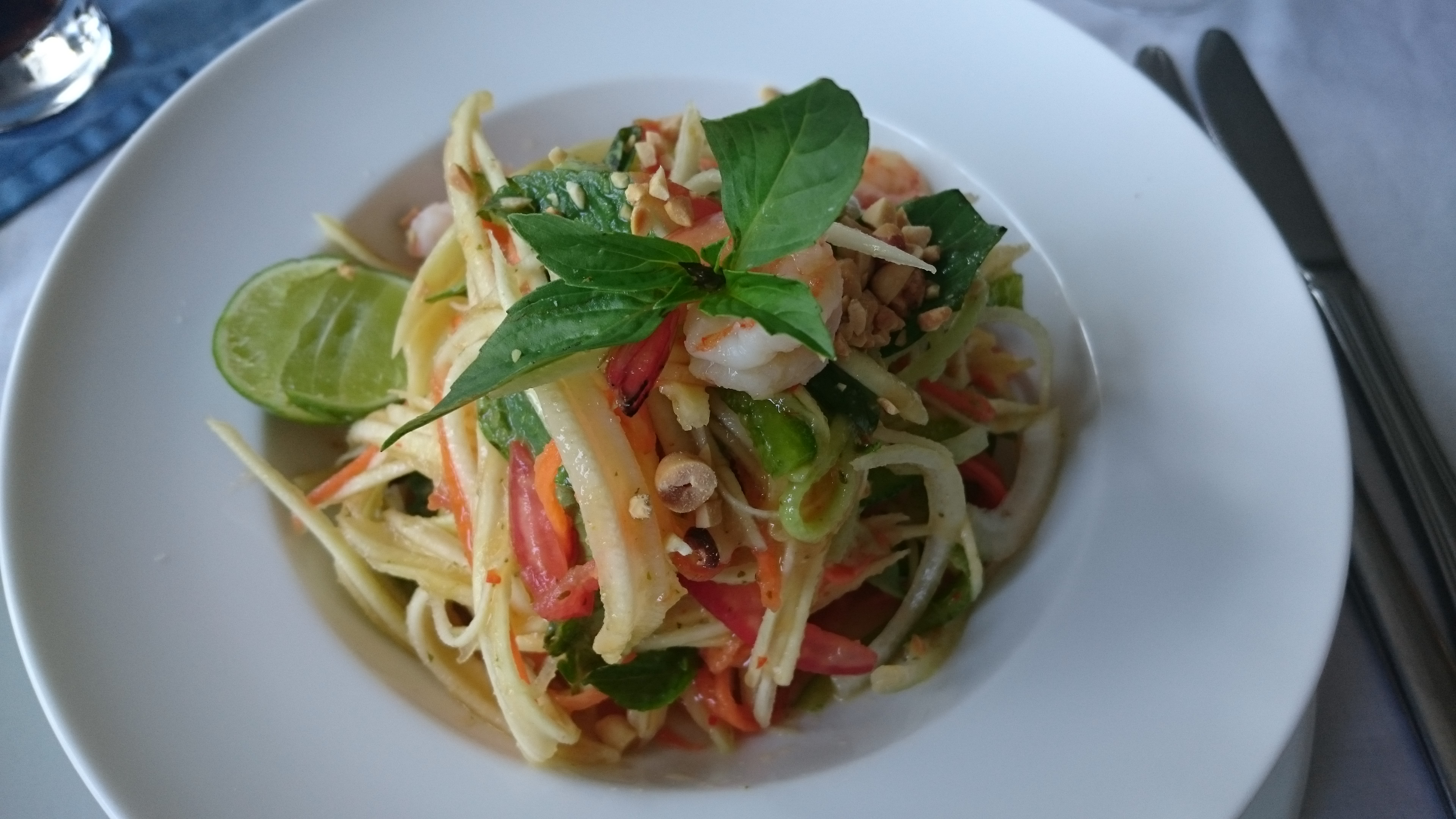
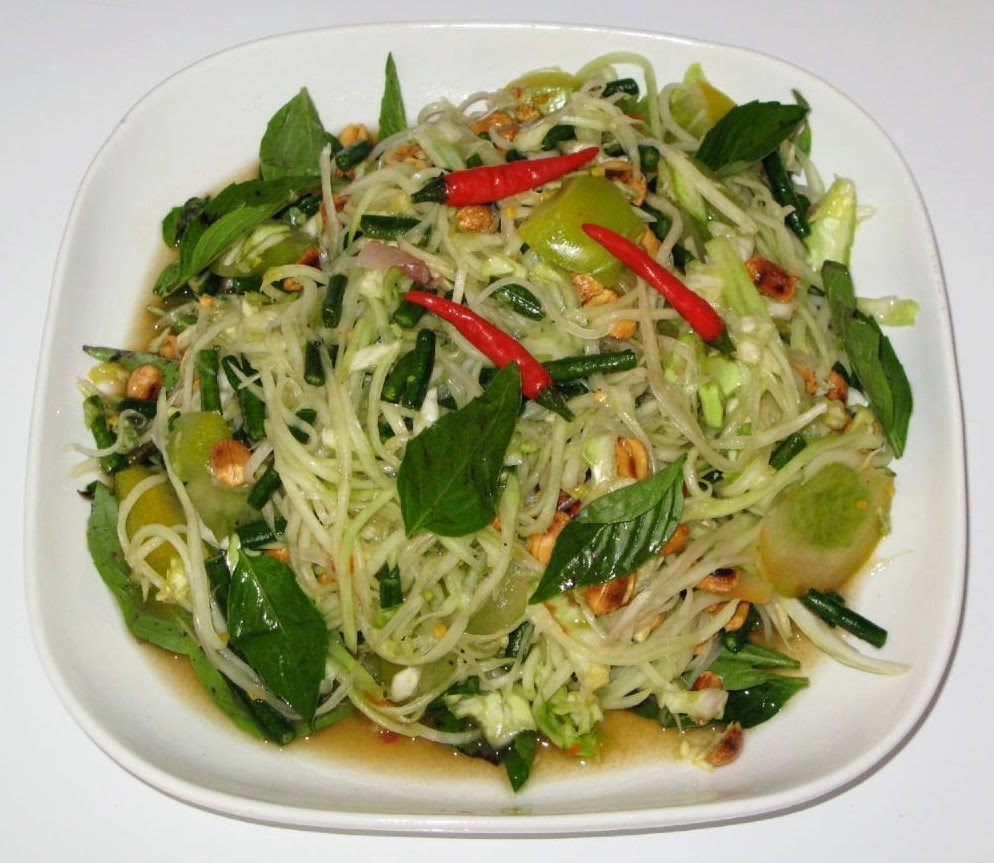
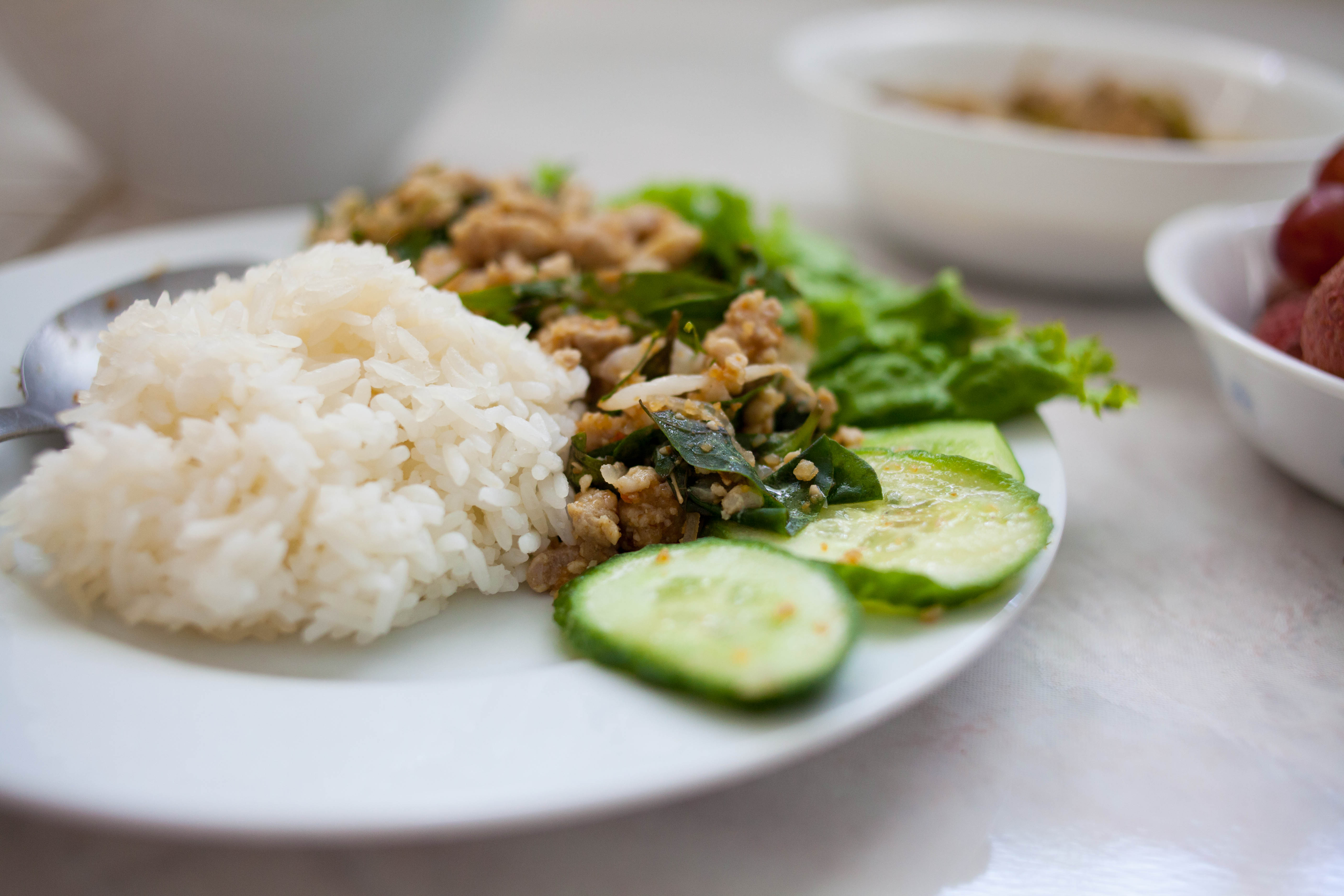
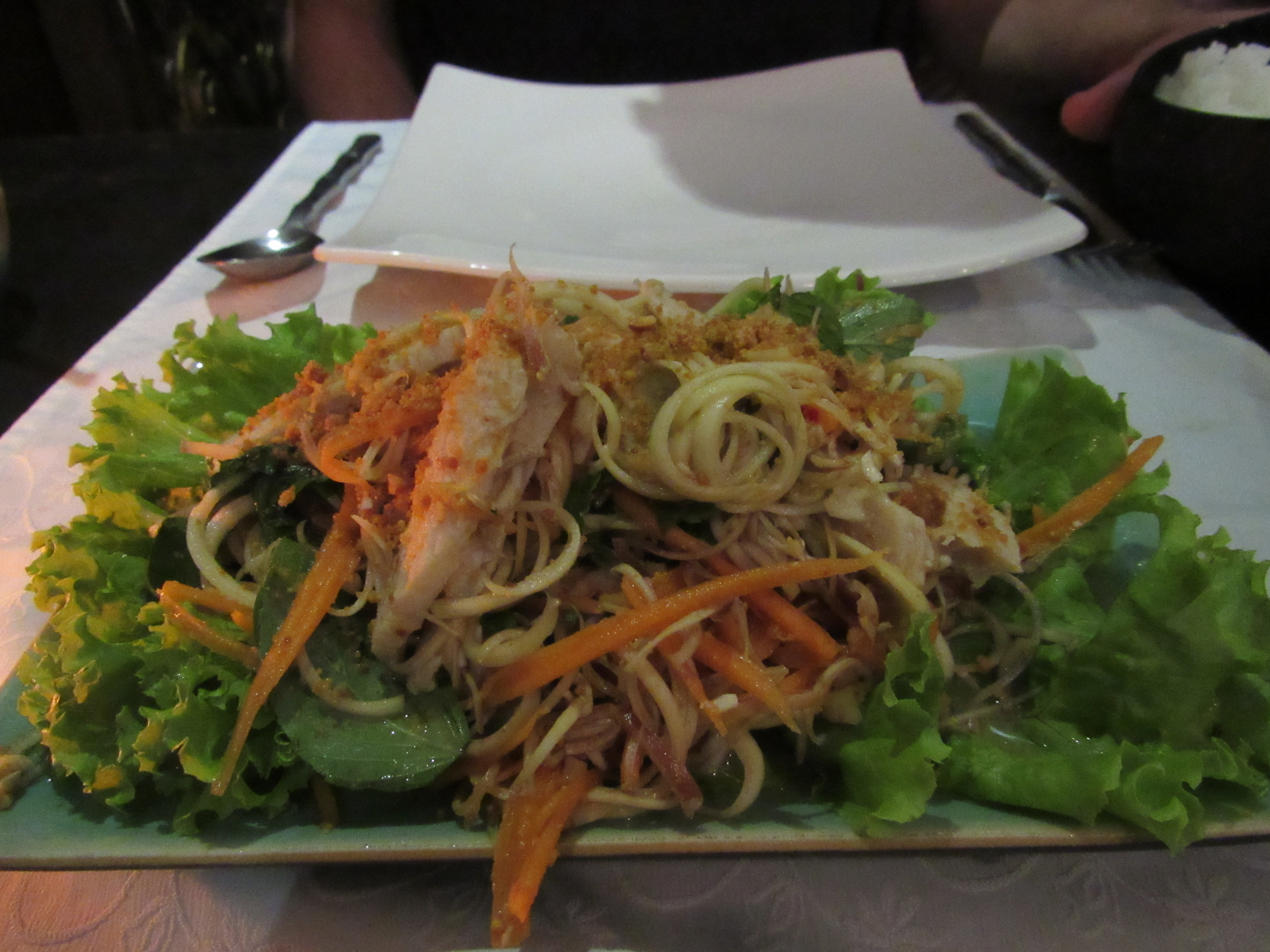
Cambodian salads: nhoam svay; bok lahong; chicken larb; gnoam trayong chek (clockwise from top left)

Vegetables and fruits are the foundation of many Cambodian salads; for example, green cabbage forms the basis of neorm salads. Fruits, especially unripe ones, are also frequently used, such as green papaya in bok lahong and green mango in nhoam svay. Common herbs in Cambodian salads include lemongrass, mint, Asian basil, and cilantro. Popular spices that add pungency to these dishes are garlic, ginger, shallots, and Kampot pepper. Dressings and favouring, such as fish or soy sauce, lime juice, vinegar, and white or palm sugar, are often used to balance saltiness, acidity, and sweetness. Sugar is used to counterbalance the intensity of lime juice or other sour ingredients. Almost all Cambodian salads include some form of animal protein, such as beef, chicken, pork, or seafood, and sometimes even raw or marinated meat. Some of the most popular Cambodian salads are nhoam svay (ញាំស្វាយ), pleah sach ko (ភ្លាសាច់គោ), nhoam trasak, nhoam masour, nhoam kroch thlong (ញុំាក្រូចថ្លុង) and larb (which can be made with chicken, pork, or beef).

=== Desserts ===
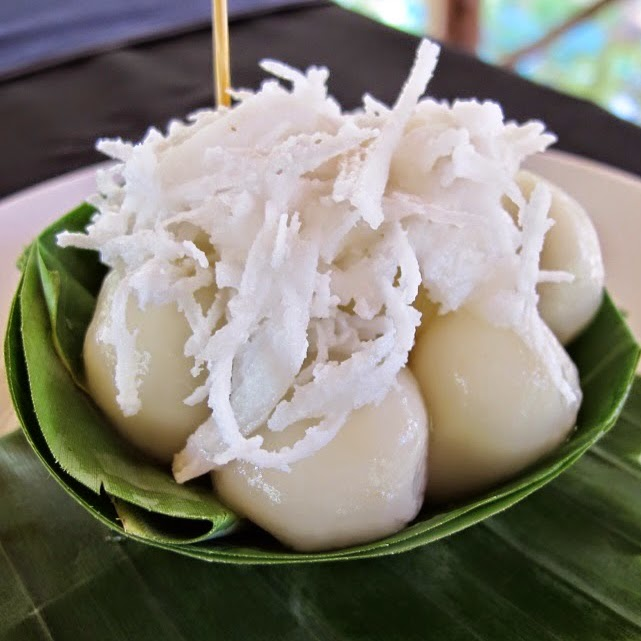
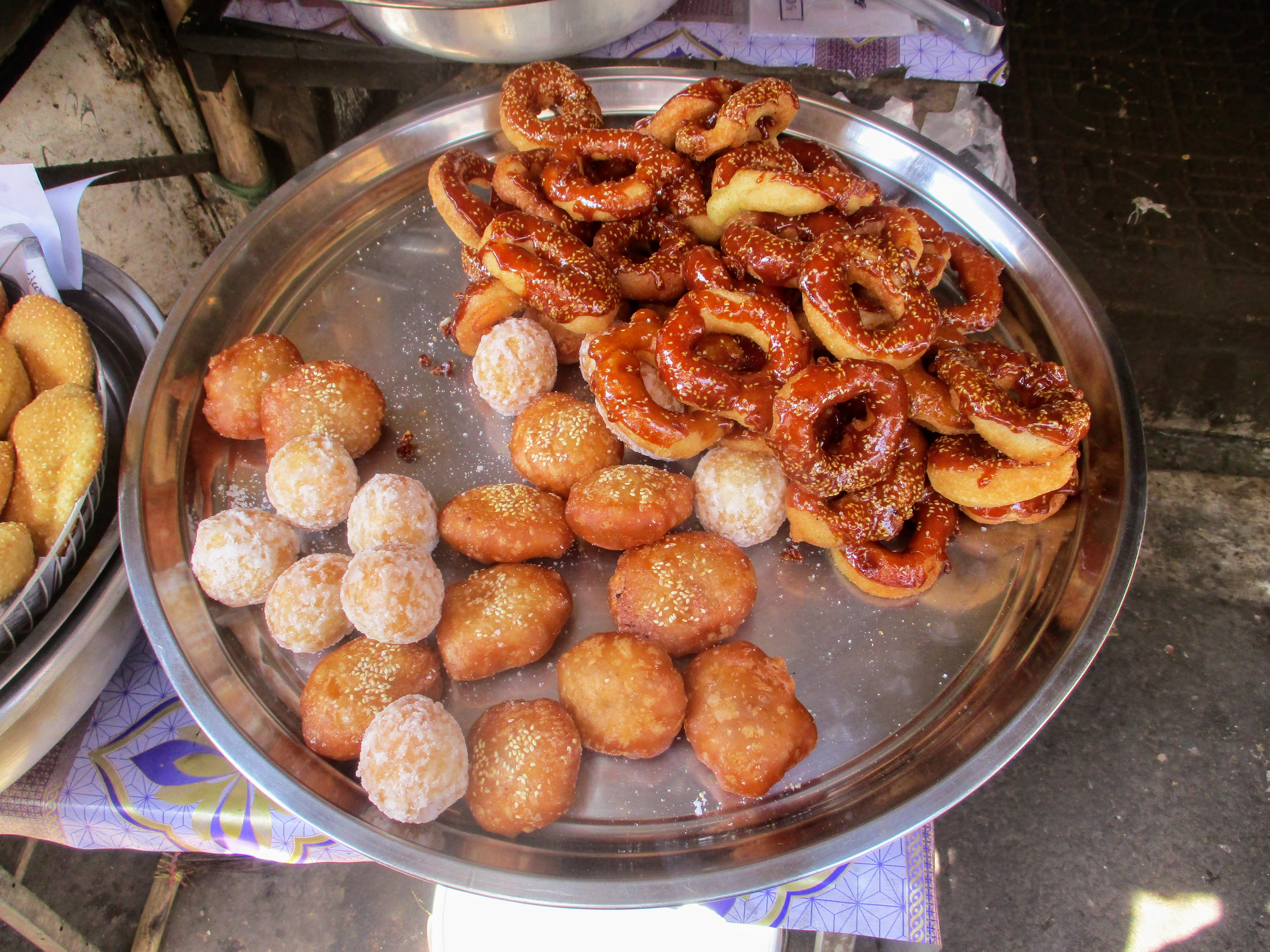
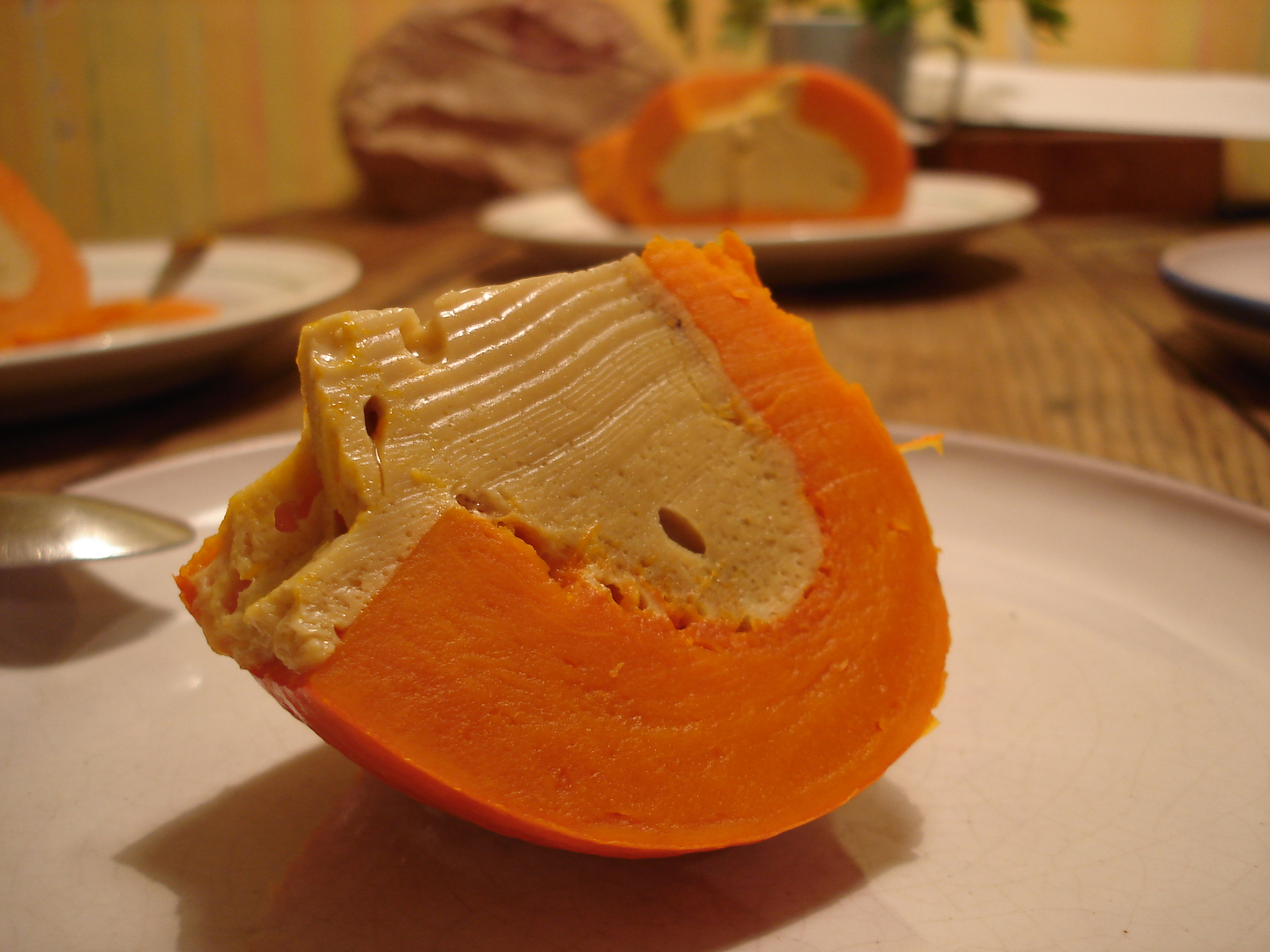
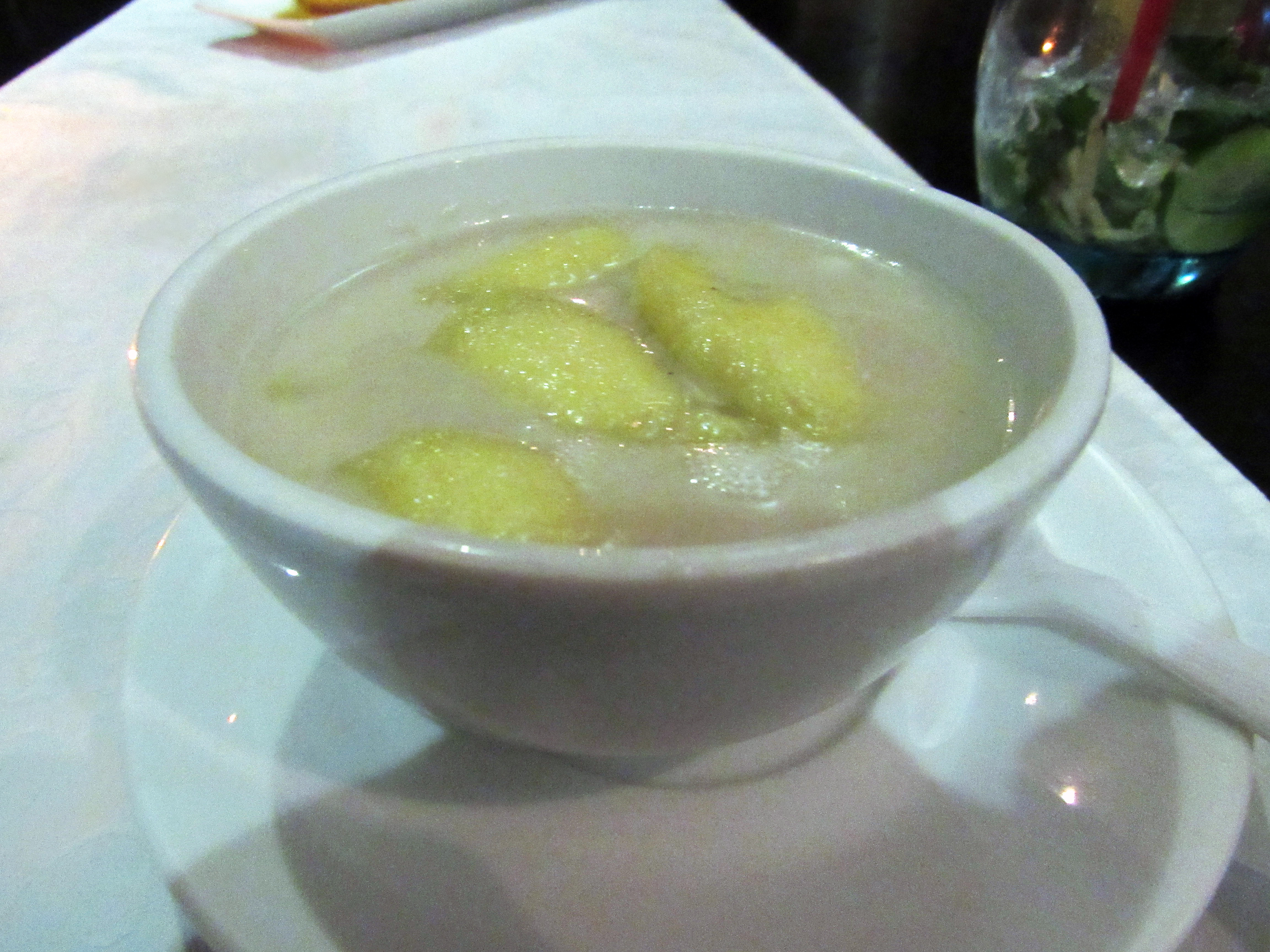
Cambodian desserts: num plae ai; num pong, num kroch (clockwise from top), and num kong; sankya lapov; and chek ktis (clockwise from top left)

Desserts are eaten at the end of a meal or throughout the day as a snack by Cambodians. There are four main types of Cambodian desserts: rice-based desserts, fruit-based desserts, puddings (ចាហួយទឹក, cha houy teuk), and custards. Steaming and grilling are the most common cooking techniques for Cambodian desserts, whereas deep-frying is often used to make pastries as baking is not very widespread in Cambodia outside of commercial bakeries. For rice-based desserts, glutinous rice and rice flour are most frequently used. Popular Cambodian rice-based desserts are num ansom chek, num plae ai (នំផ្លែអាយ) and num chak chol (នំចាក់ចុល). In fruit-based desserts, fruit, such as mango, jackfruit, papaya, and guava, are often combined with pandan leaf extract, banana leaves, coconut milk, cream, or shavings. Bey dom neib is an essential fruit-based Khmer dessert that blends the fragrance and sweetness of ripe mangoes and coconut. Cambodian puddings are generally made with coconut milk or cream and tapioca pearls, and are eaten either hot or chilled, with ice cubes. Two common Cambodian puddings are with sweetcorn (បបរស្ករពោត, babor skor bot) and mung beans (បបរសណ្តែកខៀវ, babor sɑɑ tek khiəw).

== Beverages ==
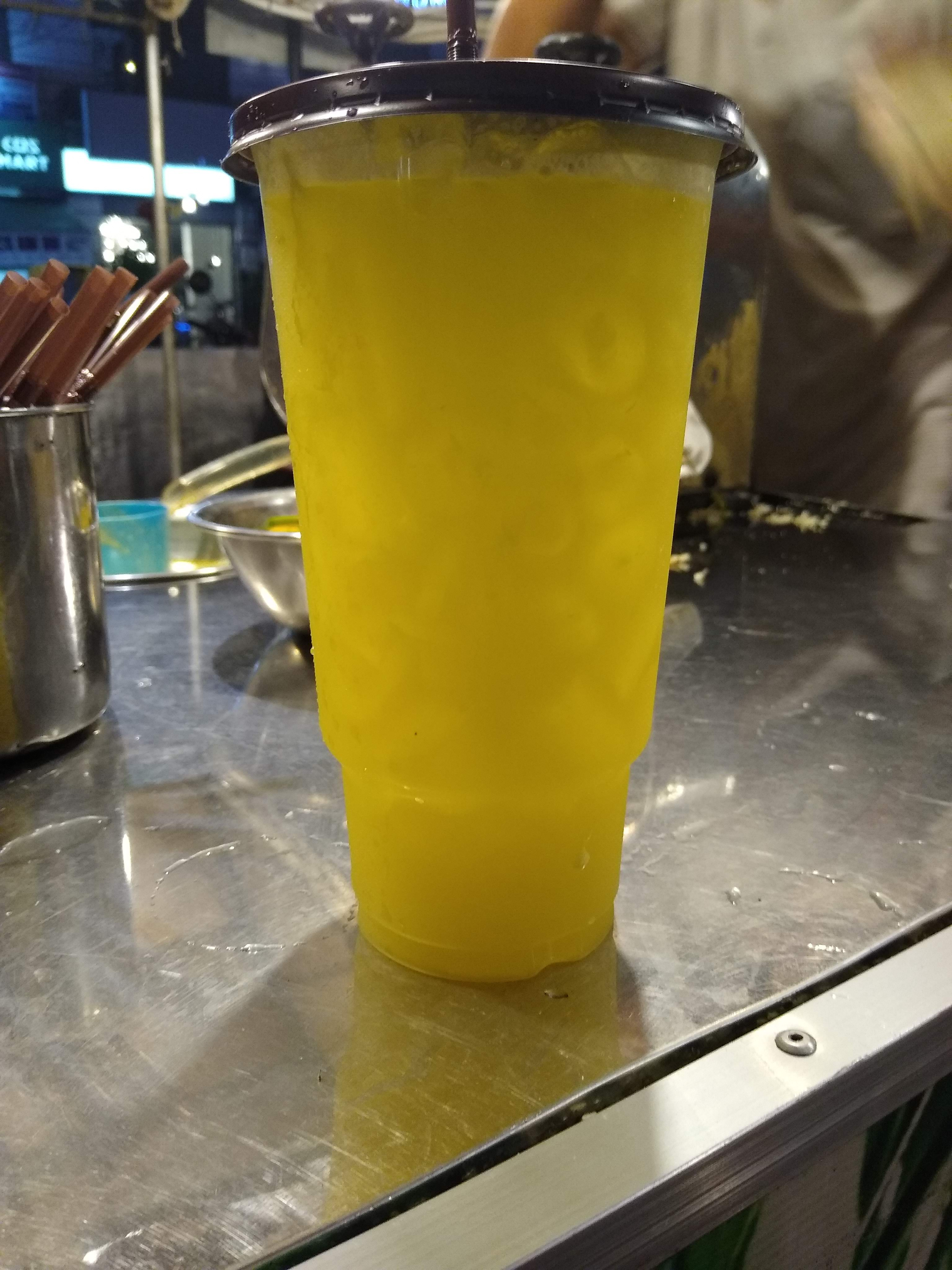
Sugarcane juice

Water is the most popular drink. As drinking water sources are not always easily accessible in rural areas water is boiled at home and consumed hot. In urban areas bottled water, as well as soda and sweetened fruit beverages, are available. Green tea (តែបៃតង, tê baitâng) is consumed throughout the day. It is believed to have been introduced in the Khmer Empire by the Chinese, but despite the growing consumption and suitable climate nowadays most green tea is imported and very little is grown locally. Camellia sinensis cambodiensis, a local strain of the tea plant, grows in the Kirirom National Park, in the remnants of a former 300-hectare tea plantation established in the 1960s by the King Norodom Sihanouk, and the area around Chamkar Te village in Mondulkiri Province. Recently, there have been efforts to revive the Cambodian tea production. Sweet tea (ទឹកតែស្ករ, tœ̆k tê skar) is also prepared and consumed.

In urban areas coffee (កាហ្វេ, kaafee) is also popular and is usually served with sweetened condensed milk rather than black. Coffee can be consumed either iced (កាហ្វេទឹកកក, kaafee tœ̆k kɑɑk) or hot. It is sold in coffee carts, coffeehouse chains and specialty coffee shops. More than 90% of all coffee in Cambodia is imported from other countries, such as Vietnam, Laos, and Thailand.

Smoothies (ទឹកផ្លែឈើលាយ, tœ̆k krɑlok) are made out of mixed fruit juice and are sold in food markets. Soy milk (ទឹកសណ្ដែក, tœ̆k sɑndaek) is sold in the morning by street vendors; the green version is sweetened and thicker than the unsweetened white. Served either hot or cold, sweetened or unsweetened. Sugarcane juice (ទឹកអំពៅ, tœ̆k ʼɑmpɨw) is also a popular street drink made by pressing the juice out of sugarcane stalks with a special machine. Served with ice and sometimes flavoured with citrus to balance the sweetness. Pandan juice (ទឹកតើយ, tœ̆k taeuy) is made from the extract of pandan leaves and usually sold in Cambodian food stalls.

=== Fermented beverages ===
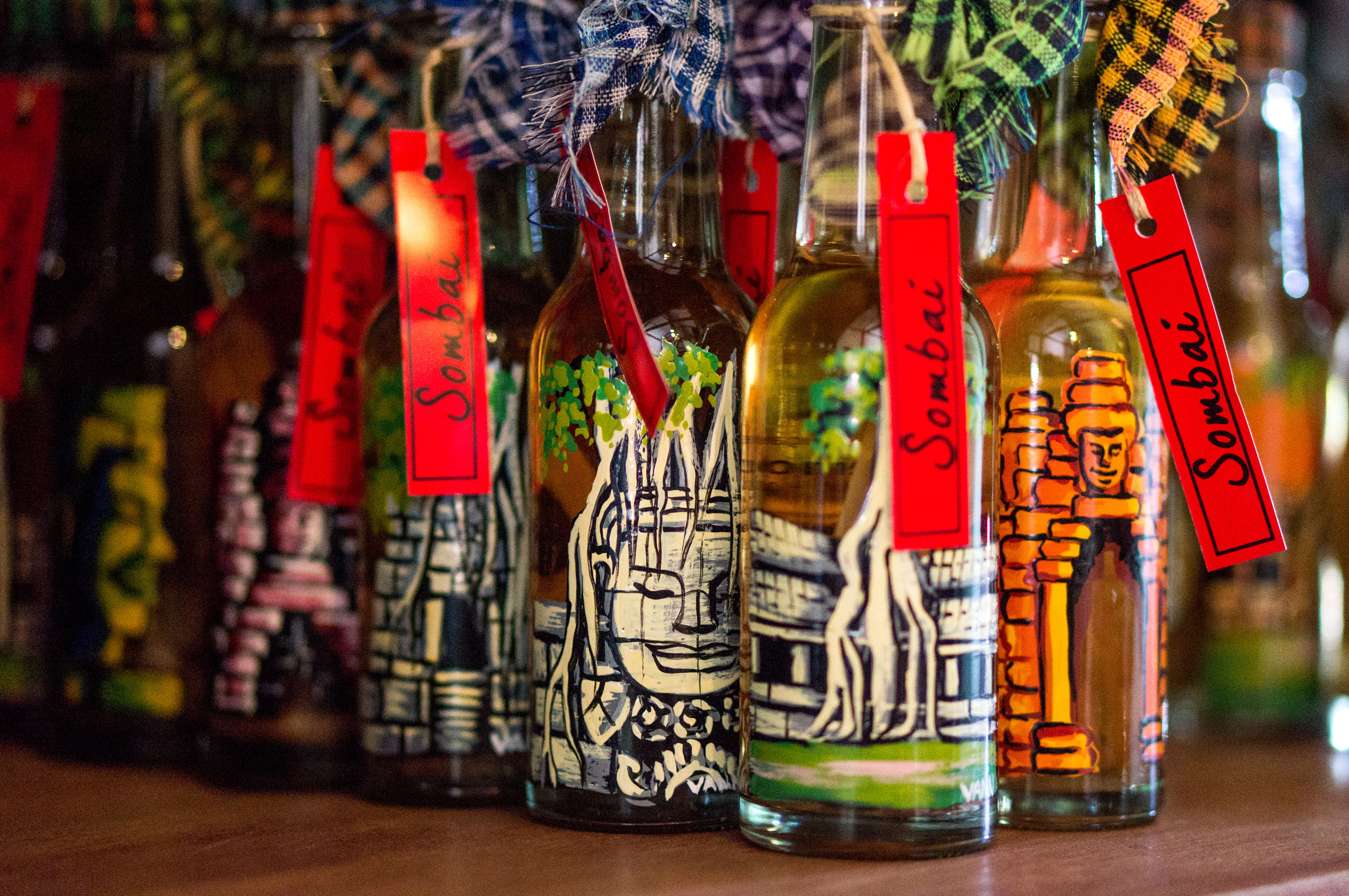
Hand-painted bottles of Sombai infused rice wine

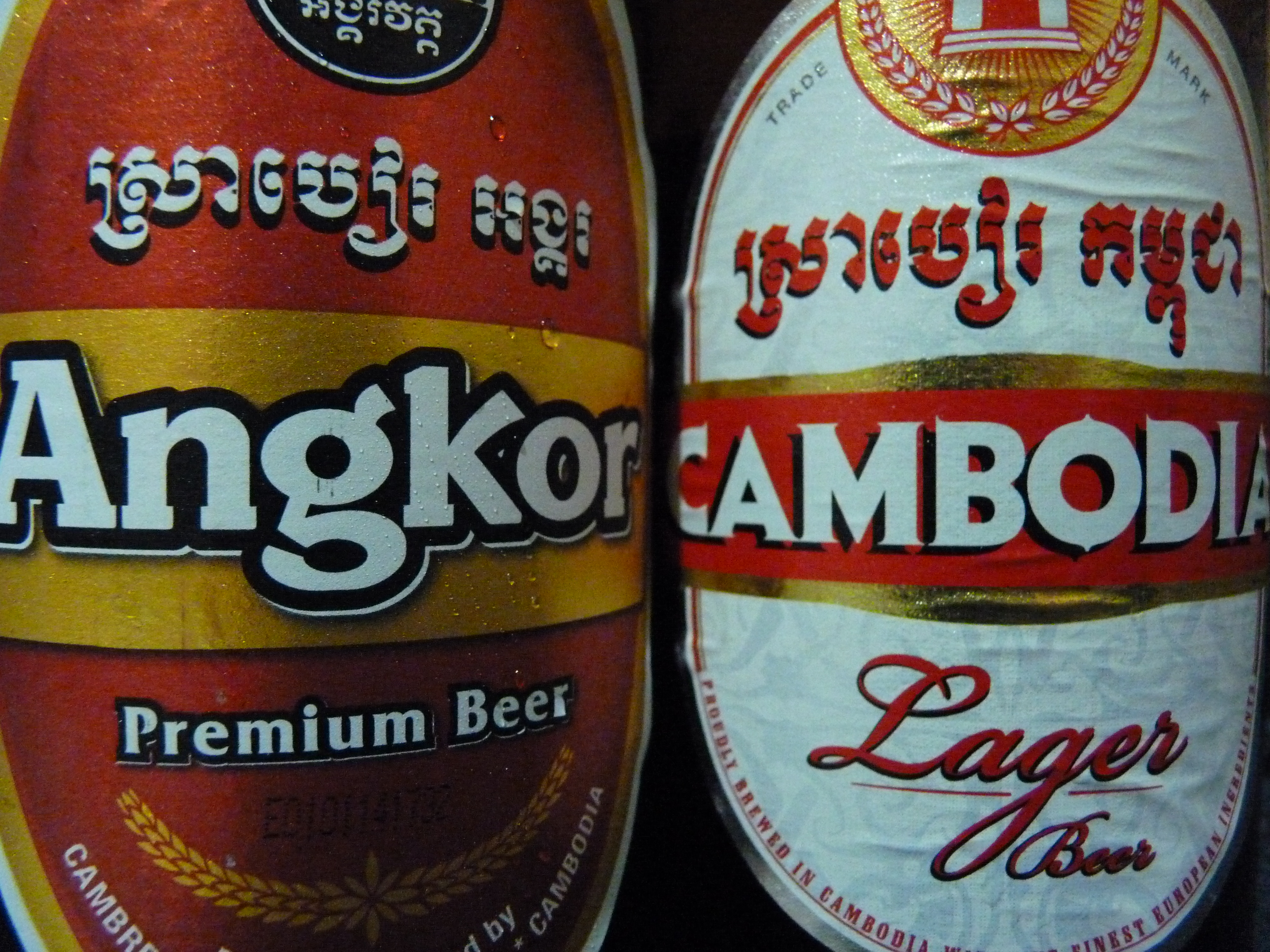
Bottles of Angkor Beer and Cambodia Beer

Five fermented alcoholic beverages were produced in the late-13th century Khmer Empire: mead, pengyasi made from the leaves of an unidentified plant, baolengjiao made from rice hulls and rice leftovers, "sugar-shine wine" made from sugar and palm starch wine made from the starch of the leaves of a palm growing on the riverbank.

Nowadays, the most popular alcoholic beverage is beer (ប៊ីយេរ, biiyɛɛ). The first domestically brewed beer was produced in the 1930s during the French Indochina period by the Brasseries & Glacières de L'Indochine company in Phnom Penh. In 1995, the annual beer consumption per capita was only around two liters, but by 2004 it began to rise significantly and in 2010 beer overtook spirits as the most popular alcoholic beverage in Cambodia. Currently, the four biggest beer producers in Cambodia are the Cambrew Brewery, Cambodia Brewery, Khmer Brewery and Kingdom Breweries. Recently, there has also been a quickly growing craft beer scene with 12 brewpubs or microbreweries operating in Cambodia in 2019.

In rural areas, rice wine (ស្រាស, sra sa) and palm wine (ទឹកត្នោតជូរ, tœ̆k tnaot cuu) are the most consumed alcoholic beverages. Rice wine is produced by fermenting boiled and dried rice with a natural fermentation starter (dom bai) for at least 24 hours and distilling the resulting mixture. Modern distillation methods were introduced during the French Indochina period. Occasionally, there have been instances of methanol poisoning from low quality home-made rice wine. Rice wine can be infused with various herbs, roots, bark and insects to create medicinal rice wines (srah tinum). A popular drink infused with deer antlers and different herbs is the Special Muscle Wine manufactured since 1968 by Lao Hang Heng Wine. The company also produces popular Golden Muscle Liquor and Wrestler Red Wine, whereas Sombai manufactures a line of premium infused rice wines.

Palm wine is a lower-prestige alcoholic beverage. It might have become popular during the French Indochina period as a cheap alternative to other wines. Palm wine is produced by fermenting Asian palmyra palm sap either through spontaneous fermentation by adding several plants to the sap and hanging the containers on trees or through the addition of a fermentation starter (ម៉ែទឹកត្នោតជូរ, mae tœ̆k tnaot cuu) made from fermented palm sap and various dried plant xylems and bark. Confirel in Pou Senchey District uses the Champagne method to produce sparkling palm wine under the name "Thnot Sparkling Mekong Wine".

A regional beverage of the Mondulkiri province is yellow and purple passion fruit wine, while wine from jambolan is produced by a company in Takéo province. Samai Distillery, Cambodia's first rum distillery, produces rum and even uses Kampot peppercorns in one of its products. Cambodia's first and only winery Chan Thai Choeung In Battambang has been commercially producing grape wine since 2005.

== Meals and eating etiquette ==
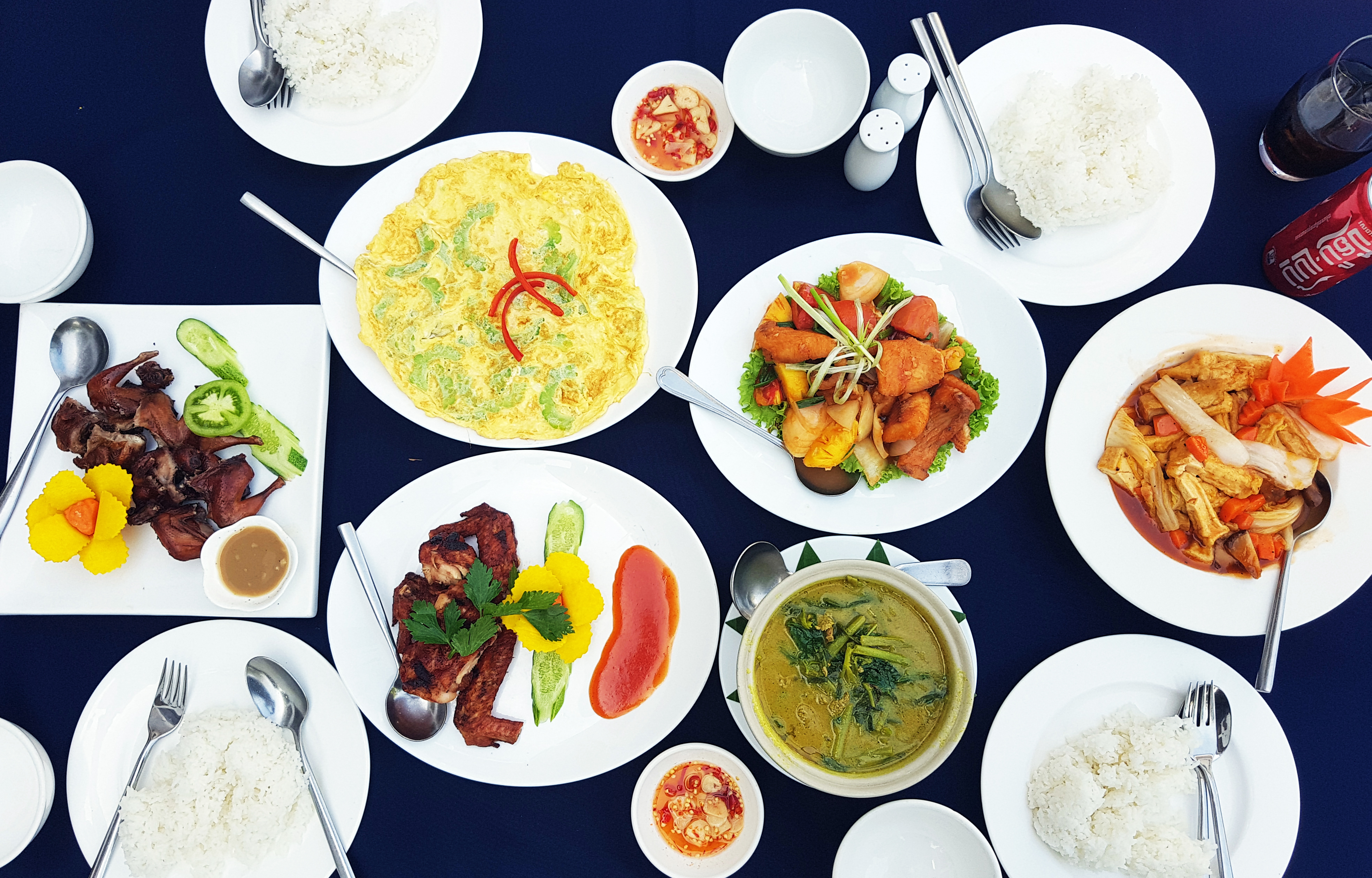
A modern four-person Cambodian restaurant meal consisting of steamed rice, samlor machu kroeung, bitter melon omelette, fried quails, fried chicken, sweet-and-sour stir-fried fish and sweet fish sauce

In Cambodia, meals are usually freshly prepared three times a day (for breakfast, lunch and dinner), although in rural areas only breakfast and dinner may be eaten. Due to a general lack of refrigeration, leftovers are usually discarded. A typical Cambodian breakfast consists of rice porridge with dried salted fish, rice with dried salted fish and vegetables, baguette with condensed milk or rice/egg noodles with meat and leaf vegetables. For lunch and dinner, Cambodians usually eat steamed rice, soup with meat (fish, pork, chicken or beef) and leaf vegetables, fried fish or other meat and fruit. In the wet season, Cambodian meals contain considerably more rice, vegetables, starchy root vegetables and tubers, as well as condiments and spices.

In Cambodian meals just like the rest of Southeast Asia, all dishes are served and eaten simultaneously, as opposed to the European course-based meal format or the Chinese meal with overlapping courses. The only exception is if the meal contains French-style dishes, in which case the dishes are served in courses. A number of side dishes are usually served alongside the main dishes. In addition to that, a variety of condiments, such as chili jam, pickled green chillies, sugar, garlic flakes, fish sauce and soy sauce, are also available. While steamed rice and soups are usually served hot, side dishes may be served at room temperature. The balance of flavours and satisfaction of individual preferences are achieved by combining the individual dishes and rice. For example, a Cambodian meal may consist of a sour soup, a salty fish, fried vegetables and plain rice, which is different from Thai food where sourness, saltiness, sweetness and spiciness are usually contained within a single dish.

Khmer food is traditionally eaten with hands, but nowadays spoons, forks and chopsticks are also used. Knives are rarely used as the majority of Cambodian food is already cut into bite-sized pieces. Forks and spoons were introduced by the French and are used for eating rice and/or soup-based dishes, whereas chopsticks were introduced by the Chinese and are used only for eating noodle dishes.

== International popularity ==
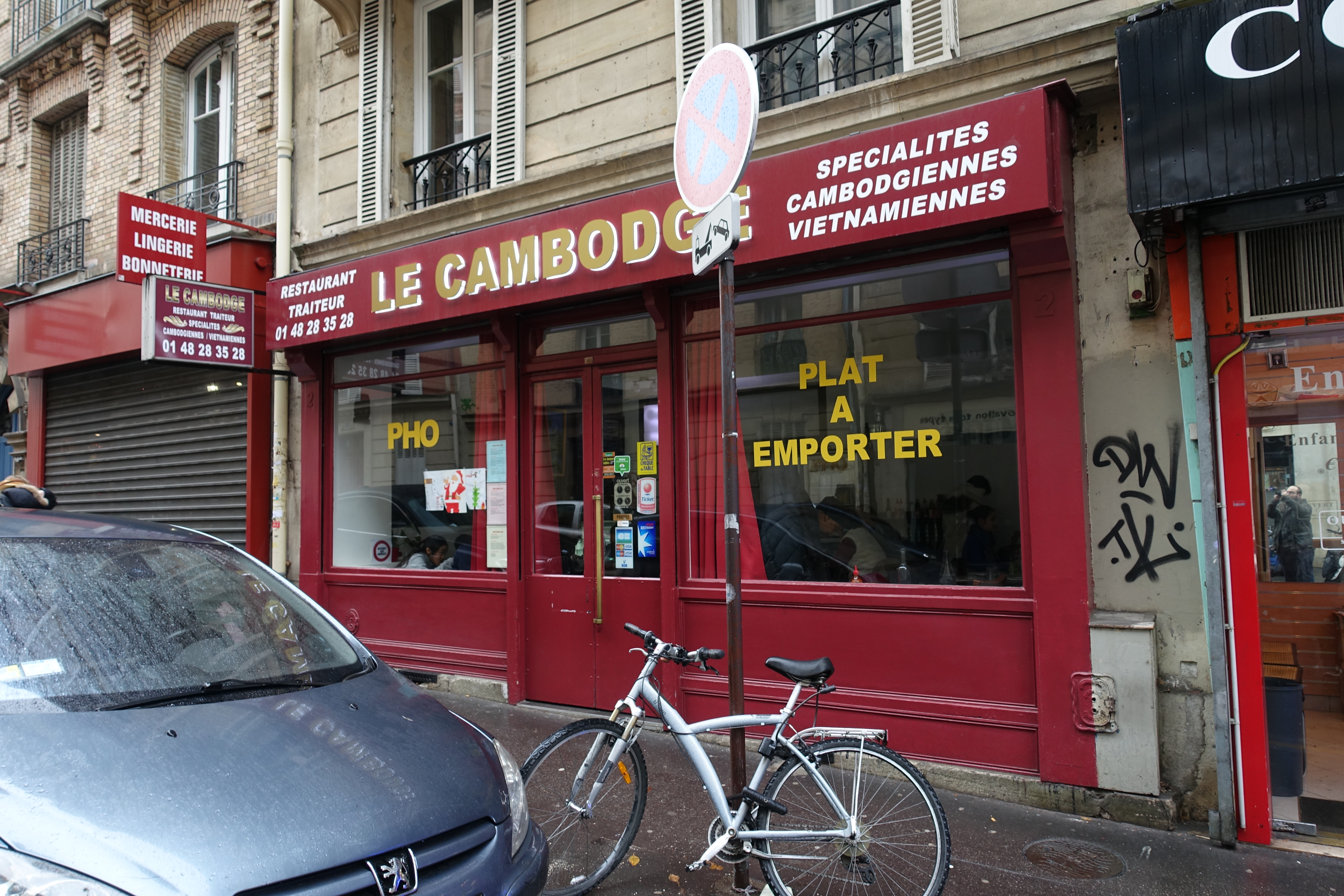
Restaurant "Le Cambodge" in Paris, France, offering a mix of Cambodian and Vietnamese specialties

Unlike the neighboring Vietnamese or Thai cuisines, Cambodian cuisine is not very known across the world. Food Republic has described Cambodian cuisine as "The Greatly Underappreciated Outlier In Asian Cooking". Fodor's Travel has called Cambodian cuisine "the most underrated in Southeast Asia" and Siem Reap "SE Asia’s Most Underrated Food Destination", while the magazine Time Out has named Kep one of "18 of the world’s most underrated food cities"

Over the past three decades, the West has fallen in love with the cuisines of Thailand, southern China, Vietnam and Malaysia, even Burma (for its barbecue), but somehow, Cambodia's food has slipped through the cracks.

— Matthew Fishbane, "Will Cambodian food ever catch on in America?" (2007)

Outside of Cambodia, Cambodian cuisine can generally be found in countries with sizeable Cambodian diaspora, such as the United States, France, Australia and Canada, especially in the Little Cambodia ethnic enclaves, but it is often aimed towards the local Cambodian community. Due to commercial considerations and the ethnic composition of the Cambodian diaspora many Cambodian-owned restaurants have chosen to serve the better-known Thai, Chinese and Vietnamese food instead, making most of them a fusion restaurant instead of a Cambodian focused one.

== Culinary diplomacy ==
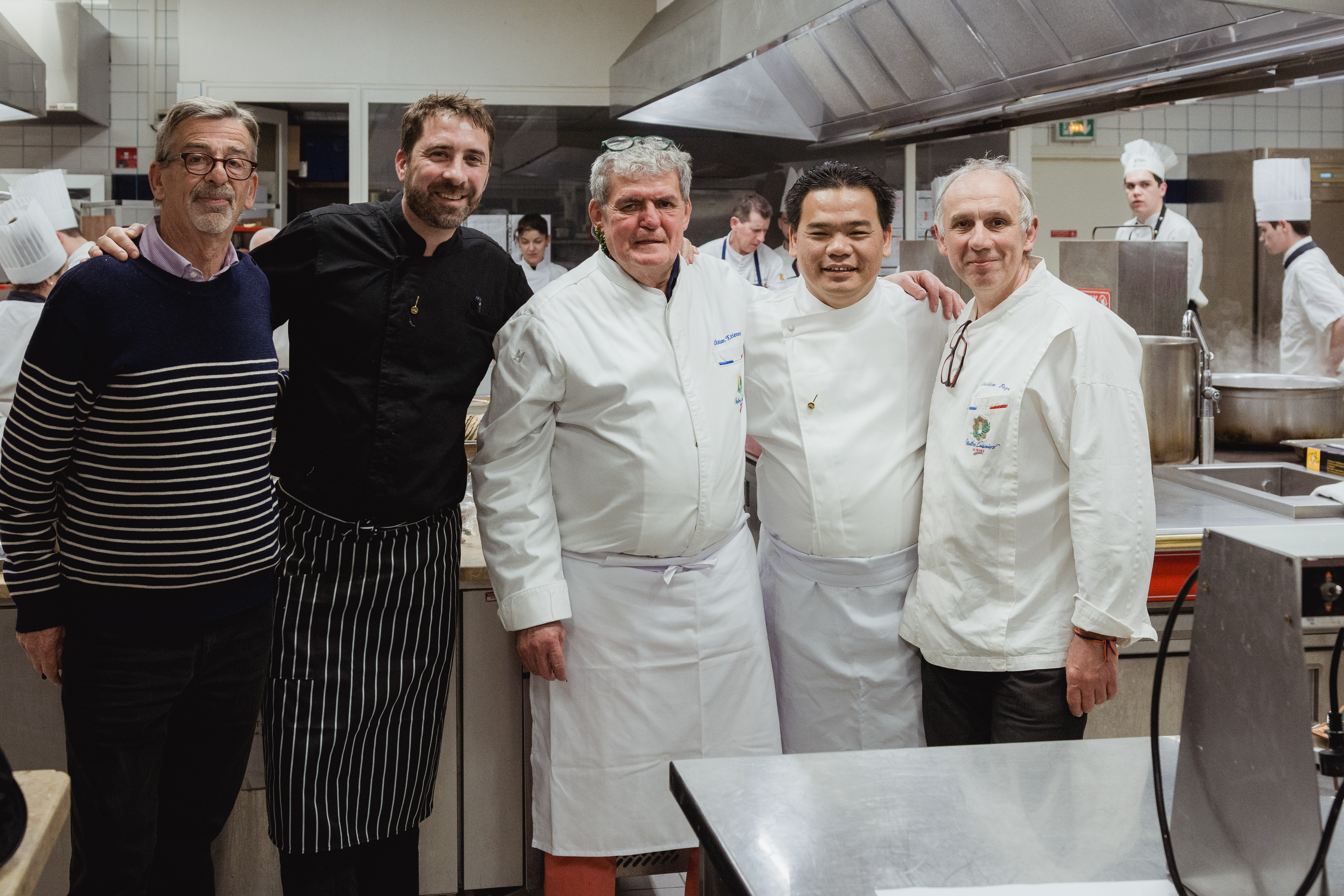
Cambodian chef Luu Meng (second from right) with his business partner Richard Gillet (second from left) in Avignon, France, in 2016 promoting Cambodian cuisine

In December 2020, the Ministry of Foreign Affairs and International Cooperation launched an official "Food Diplomacy 2021–2023" campaign as part of a larger economic diplomacy strategy. At the launch Minister of Foreign Affairs and International Cooperation Prak Sokhonn listed prahok, fish amok, nhoam kroch thlong, samlor kako, samlor ktis, prahok ktis and num banhchok as some of the Khmer dishes to be promoted in the campaign. The ministry also established a program to train Cambodian cooks for serving in Cambodian embassies and a program for providing ambassador spouses with knowledge about the Khmer cuisine.

In February 2021, the ministry published a cookbook The Taste of Angkor as a culinary promotion tool for Cambodian diplomatic missions abroad. A 1960 Cambodian cookbook and culinary guide "The Culinary Art of Cambodia" by Princess Norodom Rasmi Sobbhana republished in May 2021 by Angkor Database was also included in the campaign. In June 2021, a series of promotional videos under the slogan "Taste Cambodia" featuring Khmer foods and culinary activities in different Cambodian regions commissioned by the Ministry of Tourism of Cambodia were released. In May 2022, culinary training and representation facilities under the name of "Angkor Kitchen" were unveiled at the Ministry of Foreign Affairs and International Cooperation.

== Awards ==
=== Cookbooks ===
The cookbook "From Spiders to Water Lilies, Creative Cambodian Cooking with Friends" published by non-governmental organization Friends-International has received the 2009 Gourmand World Cookbook Award as the "Best Asian Cuisine Cookbook", becoming the first book from Cambodia to win the award.

The French-language Khmer cookbook Au Pays de la Pomme Cythère, de Mère en Fille, Authentiques Recettes Khmères written and self-published by Kanika Linden and her mother Sorey Long has won the 2010 Gourmand Awards as the world's "Best Asian Cuisine Cookbook". The English-language version of the book "Ambarella, Cambodian Cuisine" has won the 2013 Gourmand Awards as the "Best Asian Cuisine Cookbook" in the UK and world's "Best Asian Cuisine Cookbook" in 2014.

The cookbook "The Taste of Angkor" published by the Ministry of Foreign Affairs and International Cooperation of Cambodia has won the 2021 Gourmand World Cookbook Award as the "Best Asian Cookbook" and 2022 Gourmand World Cookbook Awards as the "Best Asian Cuisine Book" and "Heads of State/Food" for the book's foreword written by Deputy Prime Minister Prak Sokhon.

The republished Cambodian cookbook and culinary guide The Culinary Art of Cambodia has received the "Special Award of the Jury" at the 2022 Gourmand World Cookbook Awards. Rotanak Ros' cookbook "Nhum: Recipes from a Cambodian Kithchen" has received 2020 Gourmand Awards in the "Woman chef Book" and "Published in Asia" categories and her second cookbook "SAOY – Royal Cambodian Home Cuisine" has received Gourmand World Cookbook Awards in the categories "Best Of The Best", "Asian-Books" and "Heads Of State".

=== Restaurants ===
Joannès Rivière's Cuisine Wat Damnak has been included in position No. 50 of Asia's 50 Best Restaurants in 2015, becoming the first Cambodian restaurant to make the list. In the 2016 list it rose to the 43rd position. In 2020, the restaurant Embassy spearheaded by the Kimsan Twins was included in the Asia's 50 Best Restaurants newly created 50 Best Discovery list.

=== Chefs ===
Cambodian chef Luu Meng has received Asia's Top Chef award from the Malaysia-based business and lifestyle magazines "Top 10 of Malaysia" and "Top 10 of Asia" in 2014.

Cambodian chefs from the Cambodia Chefs' Association have won the 2019 ASEAN Gourmet Challenge with three gold medals, as well as received six silver and 17 bronze medals in the Global Pastry Chefs Challenge and Global Young Chefs Challenge categories at the Thailand Ultimate Chef Challenge taking place from 28 May to 1 June in Bangkok.

== See also ==
- Khmer royal cuisine
- Cambodian Chinese cuisine
- Kula cuisine
- Cham cuisine

== Bibliography ==
- De Monteiro, Longteine; Neustadt, Katherine (1998). The Elephant Walk Cookbook: Cambodian Cuisine from the Nationally Acclaimed Restaurant. Houghton Mifflin Harcourt. ISBN 0395892538.
- Thaitawat, Nusara (2000). The Cuisine of Cambodia. Thailand: Nusara & Friends Co. Ltd. ISBN 978-9-748-77885-3.
- Zhou Daguan (2007). A Record of Cambodia: the Land and Its People. Translated by Peter Harris. Silkworm Books. ISBN 978-97-495-1124-4.
- Rivière, Joannès (2008). Cambodian Cooking: A humanitarian project in collaboration with Act for Cambodia. Periplus Editions. ISBN 978-0-794-65039-1.
- Van Esterik, Penny (2008). Food Culture of Southeast Asia. Greenwood Press. ISBN 978-0-313-34419-0.
