= Cha kroeung =

Cambodian stir fry dish

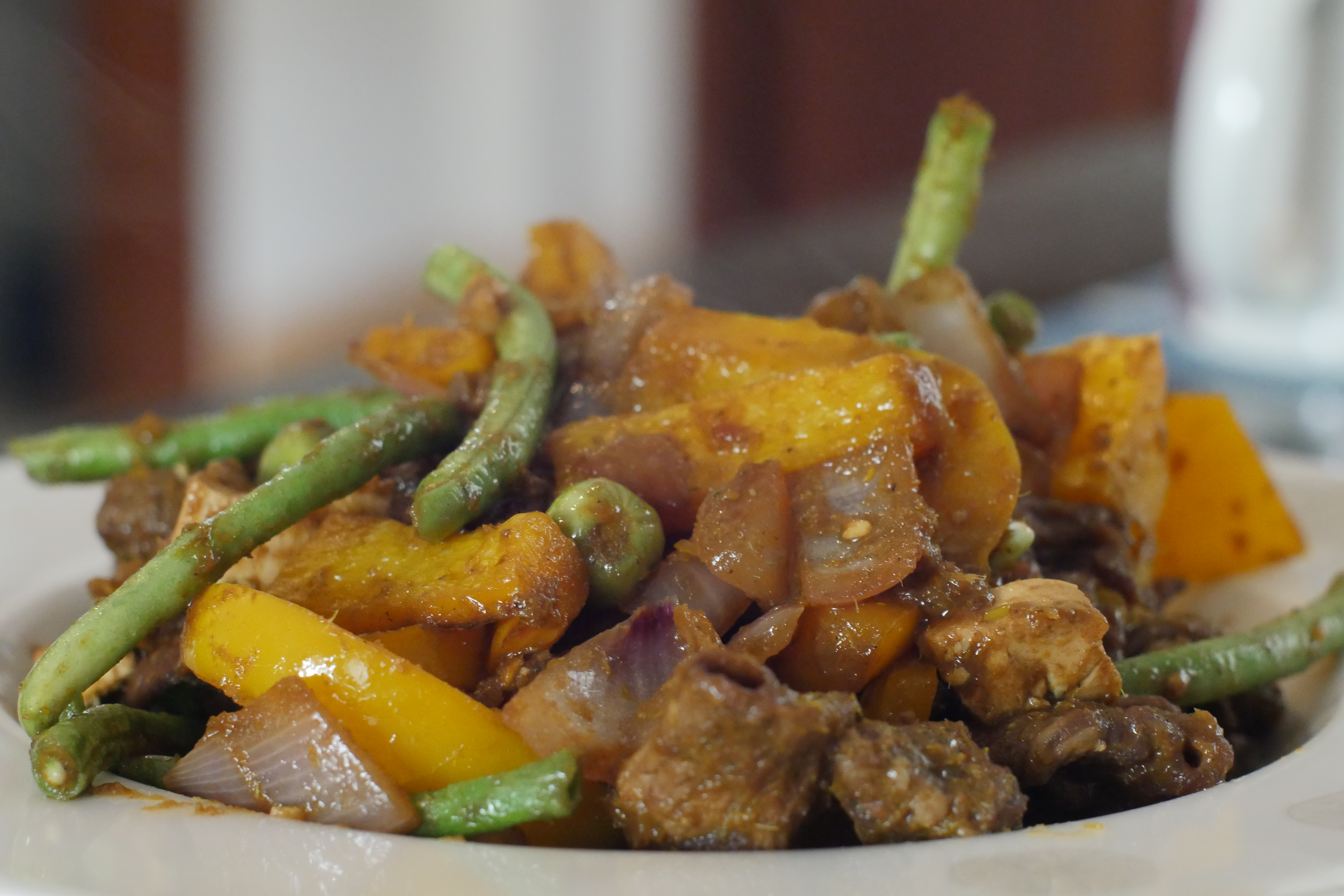
- Cha kroeung
- Alternative names: Chha kroeung, char kroeung
- Place of origin: Cambodia
- Created by: Cambodian cuisine
- Serving temperature: Hot
- Food energy (per serving): 729 kcal (3,050 kJ)
Nutritional value
(per serving)
- Protein: 41 g
- Fat: 54 g
- Carbohydrate: 19 g

Cha kroeung (Khmer: ឆាគ្រឿង, lit. 'stir fried ingredients') is a popular Cambodian street food dish made out of stir fried vegetables and meat (beef, pork or chicken) marinated in yellow kroeung served with steamed rice.

The dish contains vegetables, such as garlic, white onions, green and red bell peppers that are stir fried separately from the meat. If long beans are used as well, they are blanched before to ensure that they cook at the same time as the other ingredients.

The meat is marinated in yellow kroeung and stir-fried with fish sauce and palm sugar before the vegetables are added. If prahok is used instead of fish sauce, it is cooked in oil in a pan to dehydrate it before meat is added. The dish is garnished with chopped kaffir lime leaves, Asian basil or holy basil. Cha kroeung is served with plain steamed rice to balance out the saltiness of the stir-fried vegetables and meat.
