= Samlor machu ktis =

Cambodian sour soup

- Alternative names: samlor machu k'tis, somlaw machu ktis, samlar machu ktis, samlaw machu ktis, samlor m’chhou ktis, samlor machou ktis
- Type: samlor machu
- Place of origin: Cambodia
- Main ingredients: tamarind juice, coconut milk, kroeung, prahok and/or fish sauce, pineapple, meat, vegetables and fresh herbs
- Food energy (per serving): 574 kcal (2,400 kJ)
Nutritional value
(per serving)
- Protein: 18g g
- Fat: 39g g
- Carbohydrate: 45g g

Samlor machu ktis (Khmer: សម្លម្ជូរខ្ទិះ – 'sour coconut milk soup') is a Cambodian sour soup (samlor machu) made from tamarind juice, coconut milk, kroeung, prahok and/or fish sauce, pineapple, meat and a variety of vegetables and fresh herbs.

Although samlor machu ktis is categorized as a sour soup, its flavor profile is a balance of sourness and sweetness. The consistency of samlor machu ktis can range from a lighter soup to a thicker, curry-like stew.

== Ingredients and flavor profile ==
The most commonly used meat in samlor machu ktis is pork, typically ribs, shoulder or ham, although smoked, dried, grilled or baked fish, chicken thighs or duck. The dish is usually seasoned with prahok, but fish sauce can substitute, and in some preparations a combination of prahok, fish sauce, and shrimp paste is employed for additional pungency.

Pineapple is an essential ingredient that adds acidity and sweetness to the dish. A fully ripe pineapple produces a sweeter broth, whereas younger pineapple gives a sharper, less sweet flavor. Palm sugar and coconut milk contribute additional sweetness. Eggplants, pea eggplants or Thai eggplants as well as young winter melon are common vegetables.

Usually, yellow kroeung is used, although red kroeung may occasionally substitute.

== Preparation and serving ==
Meat is pan-fried. Fried whole pea or Thai eggplants are cut into matchstick pieces. Cubes of pineapple are stir-fried in palm sugar and coconut milk, then simmered in water or stock and seasoned with tamarind juice.

The finished dish is traditionally served garnished with Thai basil leaves, either in a hollowed pineapple or in individual bowls, accompanied by steamed rice and optional chopped chilies.
