= Khmer royal cuisine =

Type of cuisine in Cambodia

Khmer royal cuisine or Cambodian royal cuisine (Khmer: ម្ហូបព្រះបរមរាជវាំង Mahob Preah Barom Reacheaveang lit. 'Royal palace cuisine' or simply ម្ហូបវាំង Mahob Veang lit. 'Palace cuisine') is one of the three main types of Khmer cuisine, the other two being elite and rural cuisine. Khmer royal cuisine has evolved over the centuries with influences from India, China, Thailand, Vietnam and France.

The distinctions between the three culinary styles are not as pronounced as in the case of Thailand or Laos, and the main characteristics that set Khmer royal cuisine apart from the other two culinary styles are the higher quality ingredients and more elaborate cooking techniques. There has never been a special corpus of Khmer royal cuisine with specific codes, ingredients and decorum like in the case of Japanese yūsoku ryōri or Thai chaowang.

== History ==
At the peak of the Khmer Empire's power, its palace kitchens produced a sophisticated royal cuisine. After the Khmer Empire was defeated by the Ayutthaya Kingdom in 1353 and 1430, Khmer royal cooks were brought to Ayutthayan palace kitchens where they influenced the Thai royal cuisine. Through Java, the preparation of curry pastes from South India had been adopted into Khmer royal cuisine that added lemongrass and galangal to the recipe, which then made its way into the royal kitchens of Ayuttaya, where turmeric was replaced with cardamom and tamarind. Khmer royal dishes were further developed in the Ayutthaya Kingdom, where during the reign of King Narai they were supplemented with Portuguese recipes and brought back into the Khmer palace kitchens.

In the 1800s, Khmer palaces had separate kitchens for preparing desserts and snack foods, and it was done by wives, concubines and female members of the inner court. The Khmer palace desserts were labour-intensive and included intricately carved fruits and vegetables, candied flowers, perfumed water, and jasmine flowers picked at sunset, steeped in water overnight, and used to flavor sugar and finished desserts. Miniature fruits and vegetables made out of soybean paste, palm sugar and coconut, and dipped in gelatin were also made in the Khmer palace kitchens and served at royal weddings.

Following Theravāda's principles of restraint and frugality, King of Cambodia Ang Duong expected mostly vegetarian and simple meals to be served in his court in Oudong and even forbade the consumption of alcohol by his ministers.

In the French protectorate of Cambodia, Khmer palace specifications stated that the food should be prepared only with butter and not fat, a diverse and plentiful selection of fruits should be provided and only the highest quality coffee and tea is to be served. In 1932, during the high season, the Khmer palace staff included a head chef of European origin, two cooks, a pastry chef-baker and six waiters.

It has been said that the work done by the cooks of the royal palace and of the aristocracy of Phnom Penh during the first half of the 20th century reflected the same capacity for taking pains and using highly developed techniques which had been displayed by the builders of Angkor Wat, Cambodia's most famous monument, in the distant past. By all accounts, such cooks produced dishes of visual appeal equal to or surpassing those of any other cuisine.

— Alan Davidson, "The Oxford Companion to Food" (2014)

Modern Cambodian royal cuisine has been shaped by King of Cambodia Norodom Sihanouk, Princess Mom Ket Kanya, Princess Kanitha Norodom Rasmi Sobhana and their distinctive culinary styles. Sihanouk was most famous for his dishes, such as Les Profitéroles Fourrés de Crème de Fromage, where the king used the knowledge of his favourite French cuisine and world cuisine. Princess Mom favoured traditional Cambodian cuisine and spent her life researching herbs, spices, vegetables, meats and other Cambodian ingredients, and the best way to prepare them. Together with American Women's Club, she also wrote the first Cambodian cookbook and after going into exile following the Vietnamese invasion of Cambodia continued preparing Khmer dishes for the king, his entourage and guests. Princess Rasmi Sobhana, on the other hand, was known for her sophisticated presentation of simple dishes that often broke away from the traditionally strict format of royal cuisine, experimenting with carving fruit and vegetables and arrangements on different shape, size and color plates, in what she saw as more modern. She was also known for including luxurious ingredients, such as cognac or a glass of champagne, in ancient royal recipes and popular rural dishes.

== Characteristics ==
The culinary traditions of Cambodia's royal family stand out from other Cambodian recipes in several aspects. Notably, the ingredients used in royal cuisine exhibit a level of richness and opulence. For instance, royal recipes often incorporate lavish elements like giant prawns and crab meat, which were considered too extravagant for everyday cooking. The spices employed include cardamom, cloves, coriander, fennel seeds, and star anise. Royal recipes tend to use shrimp paste instead of the prahok. Kroeung for royal dishes may contain additional ingredients, such as kaffir lime leaves and coriander root.

== Popular dishes ==
Certain dishes hold a special significance in Khmer royal cuisine as they originated in the palace kitchens. These iconic dishes, once exclusively made for the royal family, have now become part of the popular cuisine. As a result, they have become an integral part of Khmer special occasion banquets, extending beyond the boundaries of the royal palace.

=== Bai domram ===
Bai domram (បាយតម្រំា) is a rice dish served with multiple side dishes meant to be eaten with it. It is prepared by allowing the cooked rice to cool overnight and absorb the morning dew. This process infuses the rice with a subtle essence. To enhance the aroma, jasmine flowers are added to the dish in the morning. During the dry season, bai domram is appreciated for its cooling effect.

=== Amok trei ===
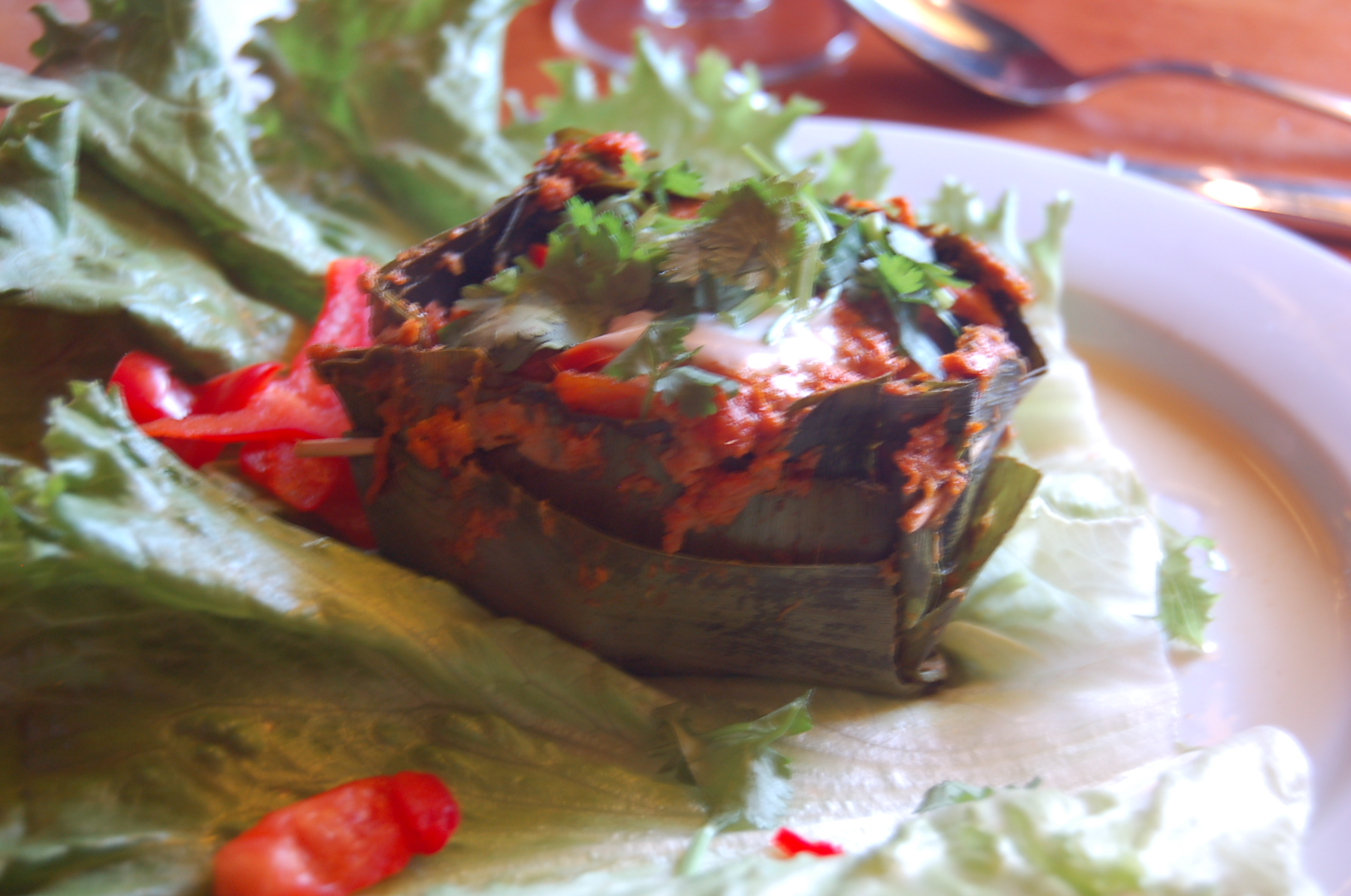
Royal seafood amok with scallops, whitefish, crab meat, and shrimp at the restaurant Elephant Walk

Amok trei (ហហ្មក ត្រី) is a royal speciality believed to be dating back to the Khmer Empire. It consists in a steamed fish curry with a texture that has often been likened to a delicate mousse, soufflé, or custard. A more sophisticated seafood version contains prawns and baby squid in addition to white fish. Cambodians often refer to it as the national dish of Cambodia. Nowadays, fish amok is predominantly served in restaurants and reserved for special occasions. Thailand's ho mok is considered a descendant of Khmer amok trei.

=== Nataing ===
Nataing (ណាតាំង) is a dip made with minced pork, coconut cream, and peanuts. It is traditionally eaten alongside crispy rice cakes. A variation of nataing favored by the Khmer royalty uses chicken meat that has been finely strained before cooking. An even more extravagant version incorporates lobster as the main ingredient.

=== Neang lao ===
Neang lao is a stuffed leaf dish of royal origin made from a mixture of fried ground pork, browned chopped shallots, browned chopped garlic, chopped roasted peanuts, pounded dried shrimp, fish sauce, sugar and tamarind juice wrapped in tapioca leaves and served with deep fried rice crust.

=== Muk mee ===
Muk mee (ម៉ុកមី) is a Khmer-style salad made of fried rice vermicelli, from which a wide array of toppings is added.

=== Saraman curry ===
Saraman curry (សរហ្ម័ន) is considered the most complex curry in Cambodian cuisine. Its recipe features a complex blend of spices, including cloves, coriander seeds and roots, cinnamon, cardamom, lemongrass, dried chilies, galangal, kaffir lime, shallots, and garlic. The dish is believed to have originated in the Muslim communities of Cambodia.

=== Vawee ===
Voy or vawee (វ៉ោយ) is a dessert of Thai and before that of royal Khmer origin, ultimately stemming from Portuguese fios de ovos. It is garnished with bright candied fruit, such as cherries, and reserved only for special occasions. The dessert can be bought only in a few select shops in Phnom Penh, where it is made by women who used to live in the Royal Palace.

== Restaurants ==
Two restaurants in Cambodia have been granted royal Khmer recipes by a decree from the Royal Palace of Cambodia – Restaurant Le Royal of Hotel Le Royal in Phnom Penh and restaurant "1932" (previously Restaurant Le Grand) of Grand Hotel d'Angkor in Siem Reap.
