= Saraman curry =

Cambodian dish

- Alternative names: kari saraman, cari sarman, somlor saraman
- Type: Curry
- Place of origin: Cambodia
- Main ingredients: Beef, coconut milk, cloves, star anise, cumin seeds, coriander seeds and roots, cinnamon, cardamom, lemongrass, dried chilies, galangal, kaffir lime, shallots, garlic, roasted grated coconut and tamarind juice
- Similar dishes: Rendang, massaman curry

Saraman curry (Khmer: ការីសារ៉ាម៉ាន់, kari saraman) or simply saraman (សារ៉ាម៉ាន់) is a coconut-based beef curry that holds a significant place in the Cambodian royal cuisine. It is believed to have originated within the Muslim community of Cambodia.

== Characteristics ==
Regarded as the richest and most intricate curry among all Cambodian curries, its recipe calls for a comprehensive blend of spices, including star anise, cumin seeds, cloves, coriander seeds and roots, cinnamon, cardamom, lemongrass, dried chilies, galangal, kaffir lime, shallots, and garlic. To balance the richness of the coconut milk, roasted grated coconut and tamarind juice are added. Peanuts serve as garnishes.

== History ==
The use of beef, in respect to Muslim dietary practices, makes it a special occasion meal in a country where cows historically served as vital agricultural assets. While the exact origins of the dish remain unclear, it is commonly acknowledged that the curry has roots in the culinary customs of the Cham minority. However, the use of the term Cham in Khmer as an umbrella term for any Muslim communities (Cham, Malay, and Javanese) in Cambodia makes it challenging to pinpoint the true origin of the dish.

Some sources suggest a Javanese influence, notably the royal cookbook of Princess Norodom Rasmi Sobhana, which includes the dish under the name Somlor Saraman Chvea (Khmer: សម្លសរហ្ម័នជ្វា), literally Javanese Saraman. Similarities can be observed between saraman curry and Javanese rendang, as the latter is comparatively more wet and less spicy than its other counterparts, resembling the characteristics of saraman curry.
