= Ho Mok =

Ho Mok may refer to:

- Hŏ Mok (1596–1682), Joseon politician
- Steamed curry
