= Samlor machu =

Cambodian category of sour soups

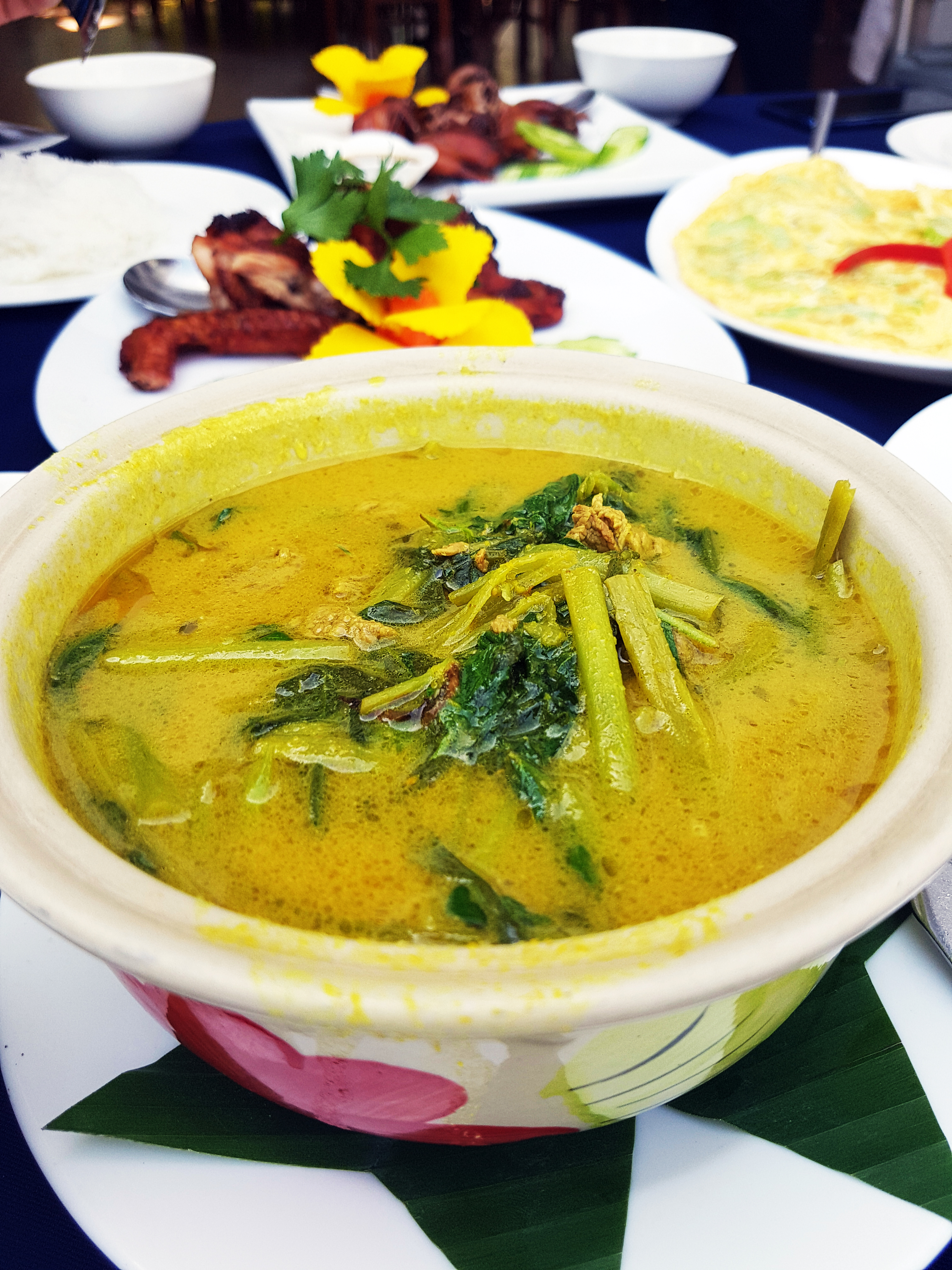
- A bowl of samlor machu kroeung.
- Alternative names: samlar machu, salaw machu, somlor machu
- Type: Soup
- Place of origin: Cambodia
- Main ingredients: Tamarind, prahok, vegetables, fruits, herbs
- Variations: samlor machu kroeung, samlor machu yuon, samlor machu srae, samlor machu ktis
- Similar dishes: canh chua

Samlor machu (Khmer: សម្លម្ជូរ, Sǎmlâ Mchu, [sɑmlɑː mcuː], transl. 'sour soup') is a Khmer term for a category of sour soups.

The sour flavour of the soup comes from the use of tamarind (អម្ពិល), however variations also include other tangy fruits and vegetables such as tomatoes (ប៉េងប៉ោះ), pineapples (ម្នាស់), water spinach (ត្រកួន), leaf celery, as well as Tiliacora triandra leaves (ស្លឹកវល្លិយាវ).

Meat in this type of soup is usually that of either chicken, fish, pork, beef, lobster or crab. In the U.S. and Canada, instead of using fresh tamarind like in Cambodia, a powdered tamarind soup base mix is also used by the diaspora. One popular brand is manufactured by Knorr.

== Types ==
There are many types of Khmer sour soups such as:

- Samlor machu yuon (សម្លរម្ជូរយួន) with meat, such as chicken or fish, tomatoes, pineapple, and other vegetables and herbs.
- Samlor machu srae (សម្លម្ជូរស្រែ) with fresh and dried fish, crab and green papaya;
- Samlor machu kroeung (សម្លរម្ជូរគ្រឿង):

- Samlor machu kroeung sach ko (សម្លរម្ជូរគ្រឿងសាច់គោ) with beef tenderloin, yellow kroeung, water spinach, fish sauce and/or prahok, as well as green beans, and eggplants.
- Samlor machu kroeung sach chrouk with pork ribs, yellow kroeung, watercress, wax gourd, fish sauce and/or prahok.

- Samlor machu ktis (សម្លរម្ជូរខ្ទិះ) with pork, pineapple and coconut milk.
