= Pleah sach ko =

Cambodian salad

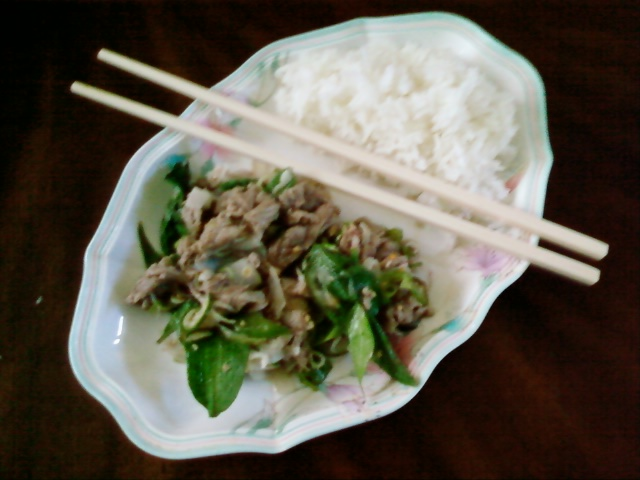
- Pleah sach ko with steamed rice
- Alternative names: p'lear sach ko, plea sach ko, pleah saiko, plear sach koh
- Type: Ceviche
- Place of origin: Cambodia
- Created by: Cambodian cuisine
- Serving temperature: Room temperature
- Main ingredients: Cured beef, lime juice prahok, shallots, bean sprouts, mint, Asian basil, fish sauce, roasted peanuts

Pleah sach ko (Khmer: ភ្លាសាច់គោ) is a Cambodian ceviche consisting of thinly sliced raw beef cured in lime juice flavoured with palm sugar, lemongrass and garlic, mixed with shallots, bean sprouts, mint and Asian basil leaves in a dressing made out of prahok, fish sauce, lime juice, palm sugar, garlic and bird's eye chilli, and garnished with roasted peanuts.

A salad, where the beef is marinated for a shorter time and seared is called nhoam sach ko.
