= Prahok ktis =

Cambodian dipping sauce

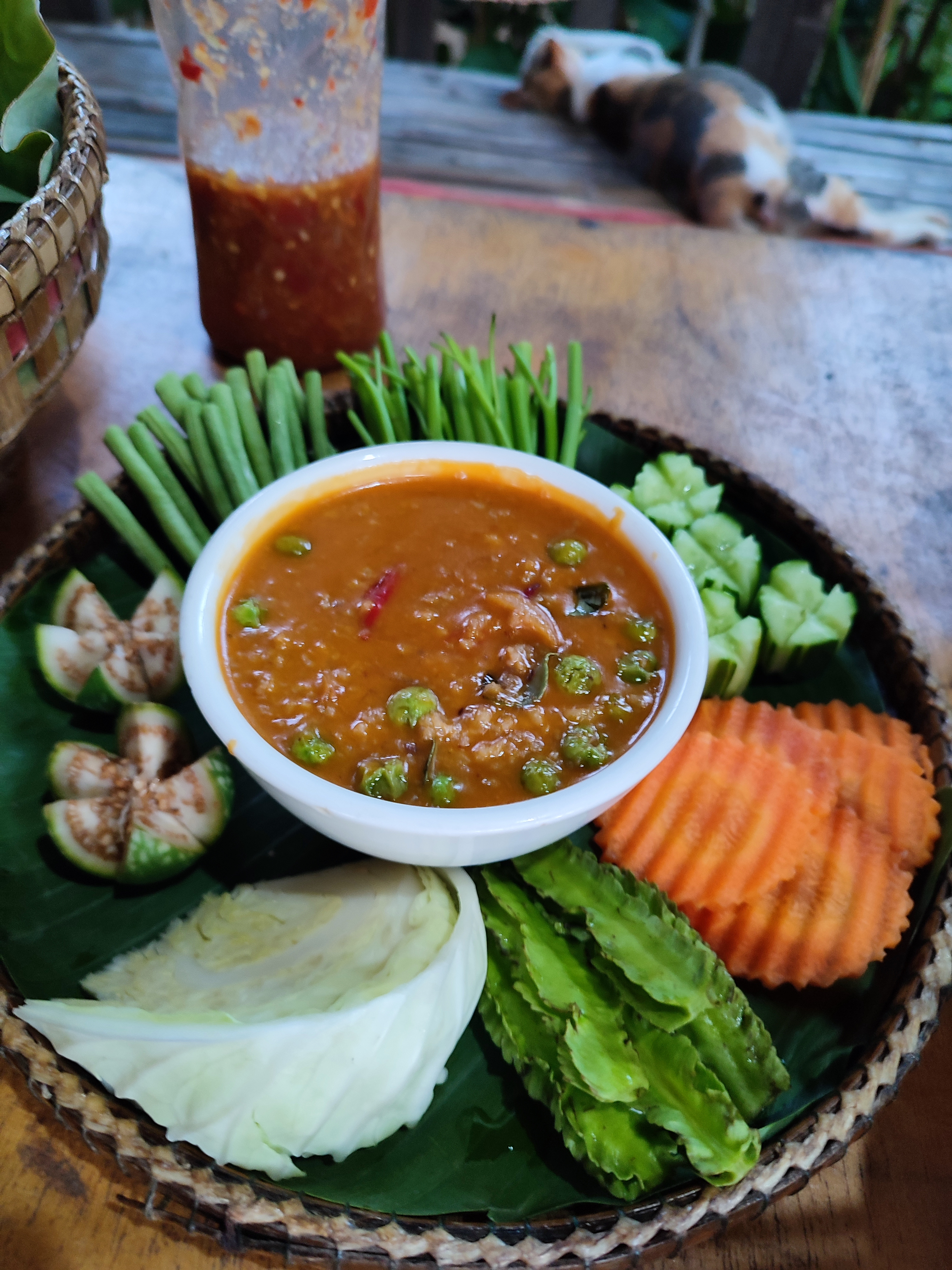
- Alternative names: Prahok k'tis, prahok ktiss, prahok k'tih, prahok katih, prahok kteih
- Type: Dipping sauce
- Place of origin: Cambodia
- Main ingredients: prahok sach, minced pork, yellow kroeung, coconut cream, tamarind juice, palm sugar, pea eggplants and kaffir lime leaves.

Prahok ktis (Khmer: ប្រហុកខ្ទិះ, prâhŏk khtih) is a Cambodian dipping sauce made from prahok sach, minced pork, yellow kroeung, coconut cream, tamarind juice, palm sugar, pea eggplants and kaffir lime leaves. Pea eggplants can also be replaced with green apples, unripe peaches or nectarines, cabbage or cauliflower.

Prahok ktis is eaten with fresh vegetables such as cucumber, carrots, cabbage, long beans, iceberg lettuce, string beans, and round eggplants. The combination of fermented fish and pork unfamiliar to many non-Cambodians can sometimes cause a misperception that spoiled pork has been used.

Prahok ktis has been named by Minister of Foreign Affairs and International Cooperation Prak Sokhonn as one of the dishes to be promoted in Cambodia's culinary diplomacy campaign.
