= Fish amok =

Cambodian steamed fish curry

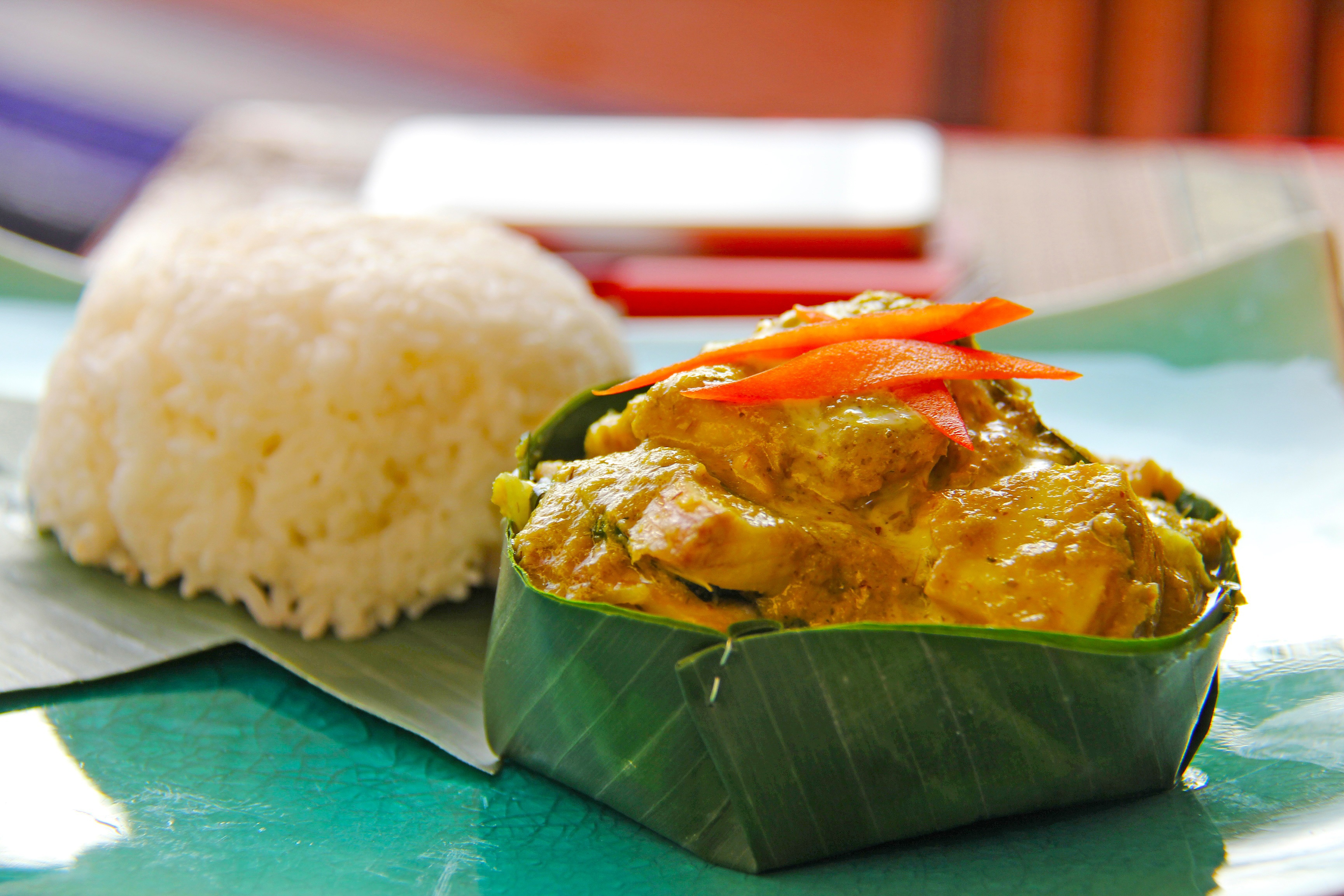
- Fish amok served in a banana leaf container
- Alternative names: Amok trei, amok trey
- Type: Steamed curry
- Place of origin: Cambodia
- Serving temperature: Hot
- Main ingredients: Goby fish, snakehead fish or catfish, yellow or green kroeung, coconut cream or coconut milk, eggs

Fish amok or amok trey (Khmer: អាម៉ុកត្រី [ʔaːmok trəj]) is a Khmer steamed fish curry (amok) with a mousse-like consistency, considered one of Cambodia's national dishes. Fish amok is believed to have been a royal Khmer dish dating back to the Khmer Empire, although some question it originating in Cambodia.

== Ingredients ==
Usually, goby, snakehead or catfish is used; however, they are also sometimes substituted with cod, snapper, barramundi, salmon, whiting, or perch. The fish fillets are rubbed with or marinated in a freshly-made yellow or green kroeung mixed with coconut cream or coconut milk and eggs. The curry mixture is placed in a banana leaf container with great morinda leaves at the bottom and steamed for around 20 to 30 minutes until the curry achieves a mousse-like consistency. Great morinda leaves can also be substituted with Swiss chard leaves if not available.

Fish amok is served hot usually in either banana leaf containers or coconut shells and eaten with steamed rice. Many restaurants in Cambodia also serve less traditional versions of amok with chicken, tofu, or beef instead of fish. Other deviations include the use of a store-bought herb paste, other types of kroeung, more liquid consistency and cooking instead of steaming.

== See also ==
- Pepes
