= Samlar kako =

Cambodian soup

Samlor korko
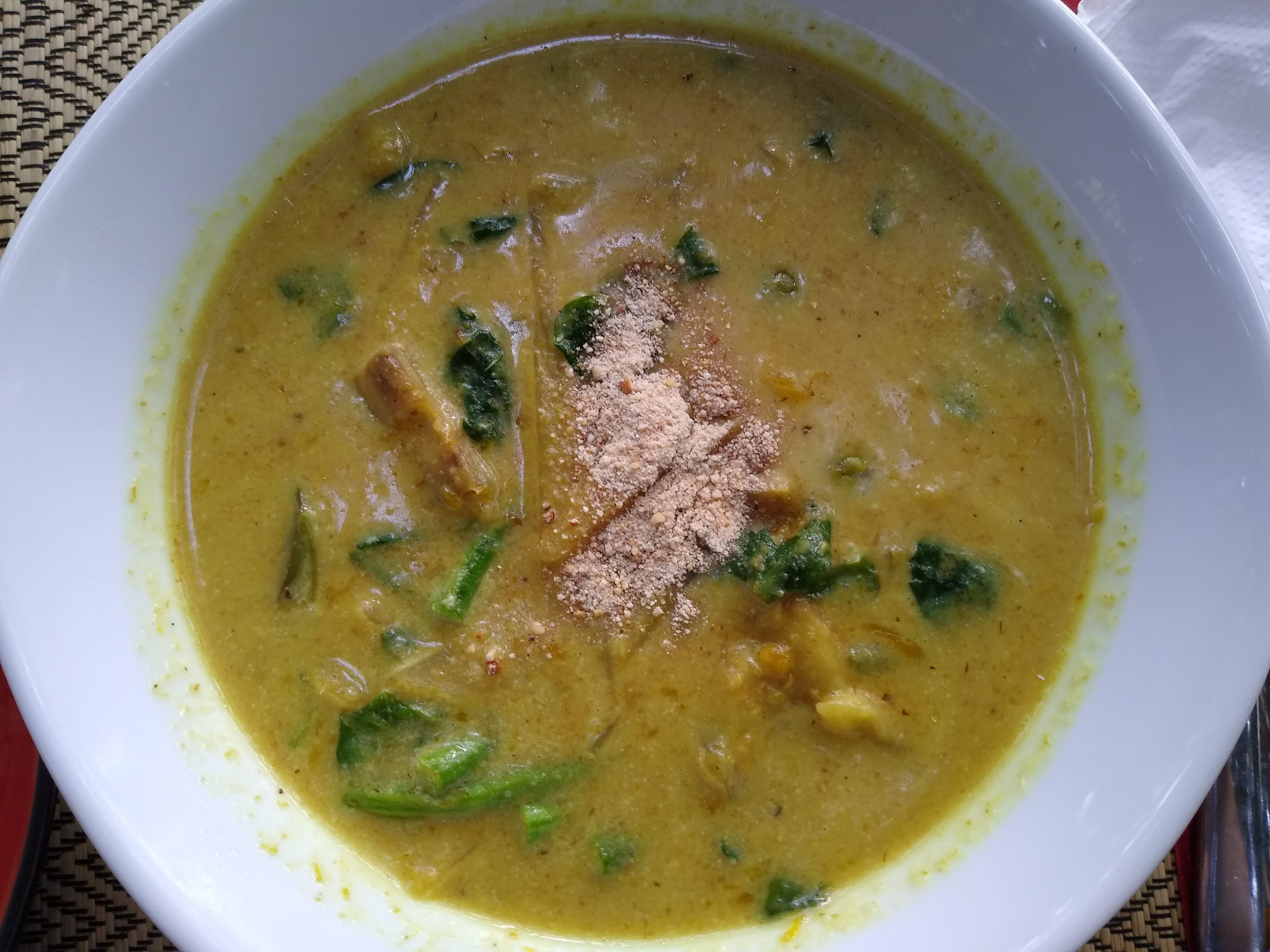
- Alternative names: Cambodian ratatouille, kako vegetable stew, somlaw koko, samlor koko, samlor korko, somlaw kako, Cambodian gumbo
- Type: soup
- Place of origin: Cambodia
- Region or state: Southeast Asia
- Associated cuisine: Cambodia
- Serving temperature: hot
- Main ingredients: green kroeung, prahok, roasted ground rice, catfish, pork or chicken, vegetables, fruits and herbs

Samlor kako (Khmer: សម្លកកូរ, lit. 'stirring soup', pronounced [sɑmlɑː kɑːkou]) or Cambodian ratatouille is a traditional Cambodian soup considered one of Cambodia's national dishes. Samlar kako consists of green kroeung, prahok, roasted ground rice, catfish, pork or chicken, vegetables, fruits and herbs. The dish has been compared to French ratatouille or pot-au-feu.

Longteine De Monteiro's 1998 The Elephant Walk Cookbook recommends using Cornish hen or even free-range chicken or quail meat instead of the traditional catfish for the soup.

== In folklore ==
The soup is featured in a famous Khmer folk legend called "Young black lady's magic formula for a love charm" (មន្តស្នេហ៍ស្រីខ្មៅ). In the legend, a young crown prince Guj Monoraj of a kingdom called Aranh Panh-chak Seila ("forest country that follows the principle of five virtues") goes hunting in a forest and gets lost while chasing after an antelope. Eventually, the prince makes his way out of the forest, but exhausted, scratched and bleeding passes out on horseback while heading towards a village. The unconscious prince is carried inside by an elderly couple who live with their daughter, a beautiful young girl called Neang Khmao (នាងខ្មៅ, lit. 'young black girl').

Eventually, the prince regains consciousness, but is still very weak, so the family nurses him back to health. One day, the prince sees Neang Khmao and her mother preparing a soup he has never seen before that seemingly contains every single vegetable, Asked what kind of soup is it, Neang Khmao replies that it is a "soup of hundred ingredients" (samlor muoy roy mouk). The prince tastes it and it is the most delicious soup he has ever had. Meanwhile, the prince's parents have sent a search party that eventually finds the prince at an orchard in the company of Neang Khmao and escorts them both back to the palace where the prince reveals his true identity. Two weeks later, the prince still cannot forget Neang Khmao, so he persuades his parents to go with him to Neang Khmao and taste the soup. In an entourage of soldiers and servants they travel back to Neang Khmao. By the next morning after arriving, they have gathered all the ingredients necessary and start preparing the soup.

Three cooks are assigned to prepare the soup, constantly stirring it as it cooks. When the soup is ready, the king tastes it and exclaims that it is delicious, but still seems to be lacking something. He pours some toasted rice in the soup from a plate on a rattan strap left out for sparrows and tastes it again, concluding that now it is perfect. The king asks for the soup's name and is told by the villagers that it is called the "soup of hundred ingredients", to which the king replies that the soup should be called the "stirred soup" (samlor kako) because everyone was always stirring the soup and since then samlor muoy roy mouk has been called samlor kako.
