= Steamed curry =

Southeast Asian type of curry steam-cooked in banana leaves

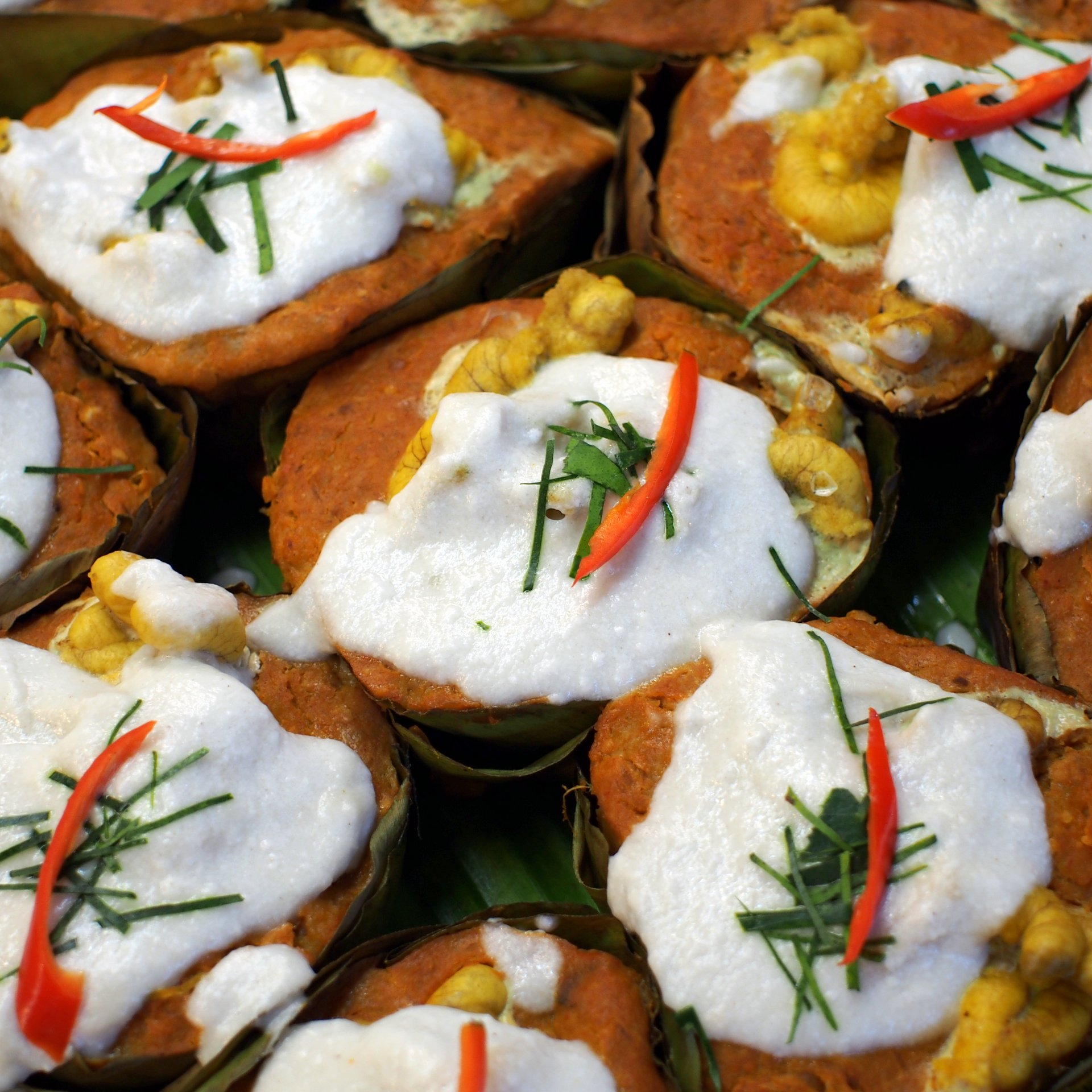
- Thai steamed fish curries (Ho Mok Pla) in Chiang Mai province
- Type: Curry
- Place of origin: Southeast Asia
- Region or state: Southeast Asia
- Associated cuisine: Cambodian; Lao; Thai
- Main ingredients: Coconut milk; Curry paste; Eggs
- Variations: Fish amok

Steamed curry is a type of Southeast Asian curry that is traditionally cooked by steaming or roasting (on an embers) in banana leaves and served with cooked rice. The curry base is typically made with curry paste, and may also include coconut cream or coconut milk and eggs. A variety of leaves and staple ingredients are often added to the dish.

== Etymology ==
In Thai, Ho Mok (Thai: ห่อหมก, Thai pronunciation: [hɔ̀ɔmòg], lit. 'bury wrap') is defined as "a Thai dish consisting of steamed fish or chicken in coconut cream and chili sauce". It is a compound word formed from Tai words Ho and Mok.

- The word Ho (Thai pronunciation: [hɔ̀ː]) means "package, things wrapped in packages, to wrap, package" and is a cognate with Northern Thai, Shan, and Kam–Tai languages.
- The word Mok (Thai pronunciation: [mòk̚]) means "to cover, conceal, or hide" and is a cognate with Northern Thai, Lao, and Kam–Tai languages.

In Khmer, Haa Mok (Khmer: ហហ្មុក, Khmer pronunciation: [hɑ.ˈmok]) is a loanword derived from the Thai "Ho Mok" and is defined as "a type of food consisting of chopped meat, chicken, or fish mixed with spices and coconut juice placed in leaves and steamed".

An alternative name for the dish in Khmer is Amok (Khmer: អាម៉ុក, Khmer pronunciation: [amŏk], meaning "to steam in banana leaves"), although Cambodian monk Chuon Nath has discouraged its use in the haa mok entry of his 1967 Khmer Dictionary. From Khmer, the word Amok has entered the Teochew Min in Cambodia. According to Canadian food writers Jeffrey Alford and Naomi Duguid, both the word and the technique may have originally been Khmer, while Cambodia-based Australian food writer Phil Lees believes the word Amok may have entered Khmer from Portuguese Amouco, which in turn was derived from the Malay word Amok or Amuk meaning "to go into a destructive frenzy".

== History ==
=== Thailand ===
Historical evidence suggests that steamed curry, also known as ho mok and ho nueng, has been a part of Thai cuisine since the Ayutthaya and Lan Na periods, as can be seen in the list of food offerings for monks during the Royal Ceremonies of the Twelve Months in the Palace Law of the Ayutthaya Kingdom, as well as in the Twelve Month Traditions (Thai: สิบสองเป็ง) and the Taan Khan Khao Custom (Thai: ตานขันข้าว) of Lan Na, which both include a steamed curry (ho mok). The dish is also an integral part of the traditional exorcism ritual in Lan Na, used during spirit worship ceremonies. The name of Ban Ho Mok Subdistrict has been recorded since the Ayutthaya period, and it is assumed by Sombat Phlainoi, a Thai National Artist (Literature), that it was a well-known location for making steamed curry (ho mok) during that time.

In the 17th century, the Japanese Chihara Gorohachi's works observed that Siam was a popular destination for foreign merchant ships. Japanese merchants also frequently visited Siam for business purposes. Japanese nobleman Yamada Nagamasa brought steamed curry (ho mok) from Siam to Japan when he travelled to Nagasaki in 1624. There were some restaurants in Osaka, Japan in the past that offered a menu item called homoku, and claimed that it was a dish introduced by Siam hundreds of years ago.

A verse in stanza no. 8 of the Thai epic poem Khun Chang Khun Phaen describes steamed curry:

ทำน้ำยาแกงขมต้มแกง ผ่าฟักจักแฟงพะแนงไก่
บ้างทำห่อหมกปกปิดไว้ ต้มไข่ผัดปลาแห้งทั้งแกงบวน

Translation:

To prepare curry sauce for rice noodles, to slice wax gourd into the Phanaeng curry chicken, sometimes to prepare a steamed curry (ho mok), boiled eggs, fried dried fish, and Buaan curry.

The Thai epic poem Phra Aphai Mani, composed between 1821 and 1845 by Thai poet Sunthorn Phu mentions steamed curry (ho mok) when Phra Aphai Mani performs the funeral ceremony for Thao Suthat:

พระซักถามนามกับข้าวแกล้งเซ้าซี้ นางทูลชี้ถวายพลางต่างต่างกัน
ไก่พะแนงแกงเผ็ดกับเป็ดหั่น ห่อหมกมันจันลอนสุกรหัน
ทั้งแกงส้มต้มชิงทุกสิ่งอัน กุ้งทอดมันม้าอวนแกงบวนเนื้อ

Translation:

Phra Aphai Mani inquired about the food in a demanding manner, prompting his daughters, Nang Soi Suwan and Nang Chan Suda, to inform him that a diverse selection had been prepared. This included dishes such as Phanang curry chicken, red curry, sliced duck meat, steamed curry, grilled fish cake, roast pork, Kaeng som, ginger syrup, deep fried shrimp cake, steamed meat dumplings (chang lon), and Buaan curry beef.

The Phra Malethethai version by Siamese poet Khun Suwan and the Nirat Malethethai by King Mongkut (1851–68), composed during the Rattanakosin Era, mention a town named Ho Mok Sub-district. This sub-district is currently located in Bang Sai District, Phra Nakhon Si Ayutthaya Province, Thailand.

Sombat Phlainoi, the Thai National Artist in Literature (2010), has said:

Both steamed curry (ho mok) and fish fritter (pla hed) are likely to be ancient Ayutthaya dishes because there is a sub-district called Tambon Hor Mok in Bang Sai District, Phra Nakhon Si Ayutthaya Province. We have not yet had the opportunity to investigate the history of steamed curry dishes, but it is tempting to guess that it is probably a renowned place for making steamed curry.

Northern Thai people of Lan Na also refer to the steamed curry dish as ho nueng (Thai: ห่อนึ่ง, ห่อหนึ้ง), and the dish is also used as part of offerings to gods and spirits from the ancient period which is similar to the Canang sari. (Note: The Phlainoi's letter written in Thai: "บทความของคุณไมเคิล ไรท์ ที่เล่าเรื่องประเพณีสะเดาะเคราะห์หรือบวงสรวงเทวดาของชวาบาหลีในอินโดนีเซียซึ่งนำเอากระทงใบตองไปวางไว้ตามสี่แยกหรือข้างถนนเหมือนกับที่คนไทยภาคเหนือนิยมทํากัน (บ้านผมเรียกว่าส่งสะตวง)" [Michael Wright's article mentions about the Javanese Balinese tradition of offering votive offerings to the gods in Indonesia, which involves placing a canang sari at intersections or on the side of the road, similar to what northern Thais do (in my hometown called "Song Satuang").])

One Thai dish similar to steamed curry (ho mok) is steamed meat dumplings, known locally as Chan Lon, Chaeng Lon or Chab Lak. (Note: In Thai: จันลอน นั้นในจังหวัดชายทะเลฝั่งตะวันออก เช่น ระยอง ชลบุรี [sic] รสชาติคล้ายห่อหมกผสมทอดมัน เรียก แจงลอน ก็มี ภาคกลางจะเรียกว่า จับหลัก [Chan Lon, found in the eastern coastal provinces such as Rayong and Chonburi [sic]. its taste is similar to a mixture of Hor Mok and fried fish patty. It is also called Chaeng Lon. In the central region of Thailand, it is called Chab Lak.]) This dish can be found in the provinces of Rayong and Chonburi, Thailand. It has a flavor reminiscent of a combination of steamed curry (ho mok) and fried fish cakes (thod man), but it is prepared differently by skewering the dumplings and grilling them until they are dry and then roasting them with coconut milk.

Steamed curries hold not only a special place in Thai cuisine but also carry significant cultural significance. There are idioms in Thai that revolve around the dish. For instance, the phrase oe-o-ho-mok (Thai: เออออห่อหมก) is used to express agreement or approval. However, there is also a satirical verse, sak-ka-wa-duean-ngai-khai-ho-mok (Thai: สักวาเดือนหงายขายห่อหมก), which uses the term khai ho mok to mock prostitutes of the past who would roam around local casinos and at the Saphan Lek in Bangkok, earning money through sex work. This dish highlights the enduring relationship between the steamed curry dish (ho mok) and the cultural practices in Thai society, dating back to ancient times. The use of aromatic herbs and spices in the dish emphasizes the importance of natural ingredients in Thai cuisine, which is deeply rooted in the country's agricultural heritage.

== Ingredients ==
Steamed curry is a dish that typically includes a curry paste or fish paste as the main ingredient. Along with the paste, a variety of leaves and staple components are added to the dish, such as fish, crab, prawn, bamboo shoots, chicken, snail, tofu, and algae. The specific ingredients used may vary depending on the region, with different Southeast Asian countries having their own unique versions of steamed curry.

== Variations ==
There are various types of steamed curry dishes found in different countries, each with their own unique names. Some examples include steamed fish curry.

=== Cambodia ===
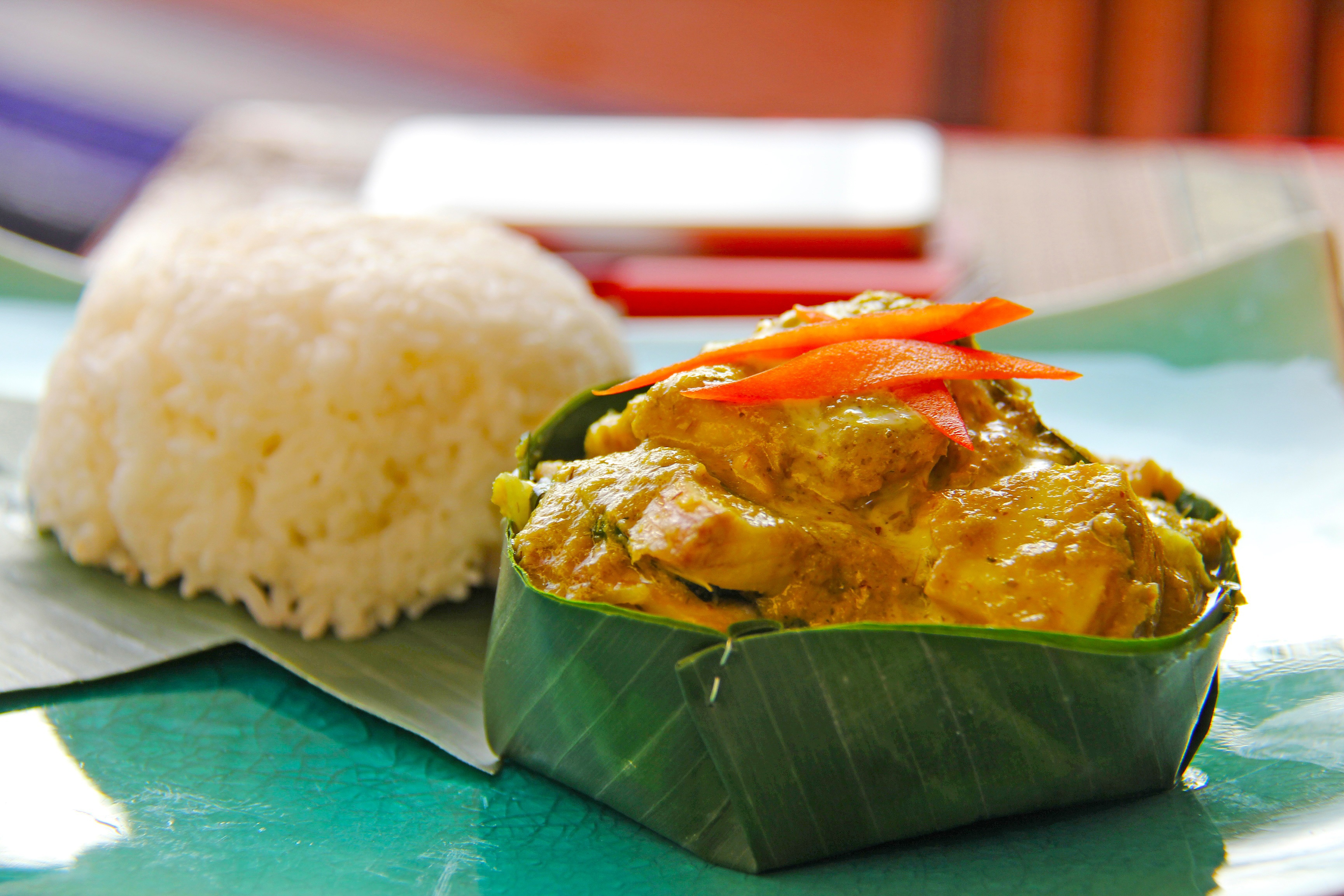
Cambodian fish amok with steamed rice

Cambodian cuisine is known for its use of a flavorful curry paste called kroeung (Khmer: គ្រឿង) for preparing a steamed curry dish.

- Steamed fish curry: Amok trei (Khmer: អាម៉ុកត្រី).
- Steamed chicken curry: Amok sach moan (Khmer: អាម៉ុកសាច់មាន់).
- Steamed Asian green mussel curry: Amok khyang (Khmer: អាម៉ុកខ្យង).
- Steamed tofu curry: Amok tauhu (Khmer: អាម៉ុកតៅហ៊ូ).

=== India ===
- Keralan steamed fish in banana leaf: Meen pollichathu (Konkani: फिश पोलीचथू)

=== Laos ===
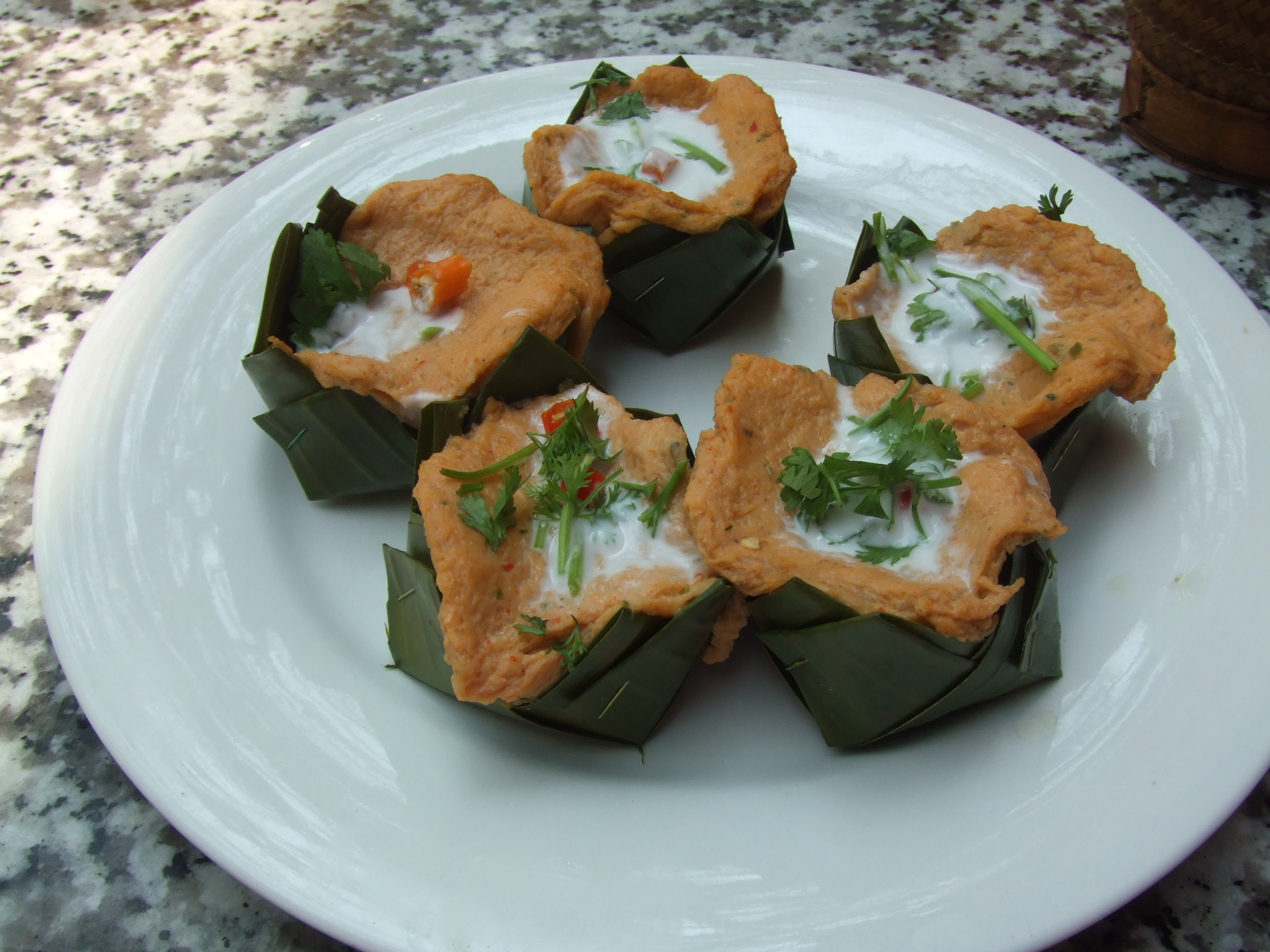
Laotian steamed fish curry (mok pa)

Steamed curry dishes are a part of Laos cuisine, often prepared by roasting them over hot embers.

- Steamed fish curry: Mok pa (Lao: ໝົກປາ).
- Steamed bamboo shoot curry: Mok naw mai (Lao: ໝົກໜ່ຳໄມ້).
- Steamed chicken curry: Mok Kai (Lao: ໝົກໄກ່).
- Steamed algae (Mekong weed) curry: Mok khai (Lao: ໝົກໄຄ).

=== Malaysia, Singapore and Indonesia ===
- Steamed fish curry: Otak-otak, Sata (Malaysian state of Terengganu).
- Steamed carp curry: Pepes (Indonesia).

=== Myanmar ===
Burmese

- Steamed fish in banana leaf (marinated with spices): Ngàbàundou

Dai in Kengtung, Shan State

- Steamed curry: Ho nung pla

Shan

- Steamed curry: Pag jog

=== Philippines ===
- Steamed tuna curry: Utak-utak (Tausūg).

=== Thailand ===
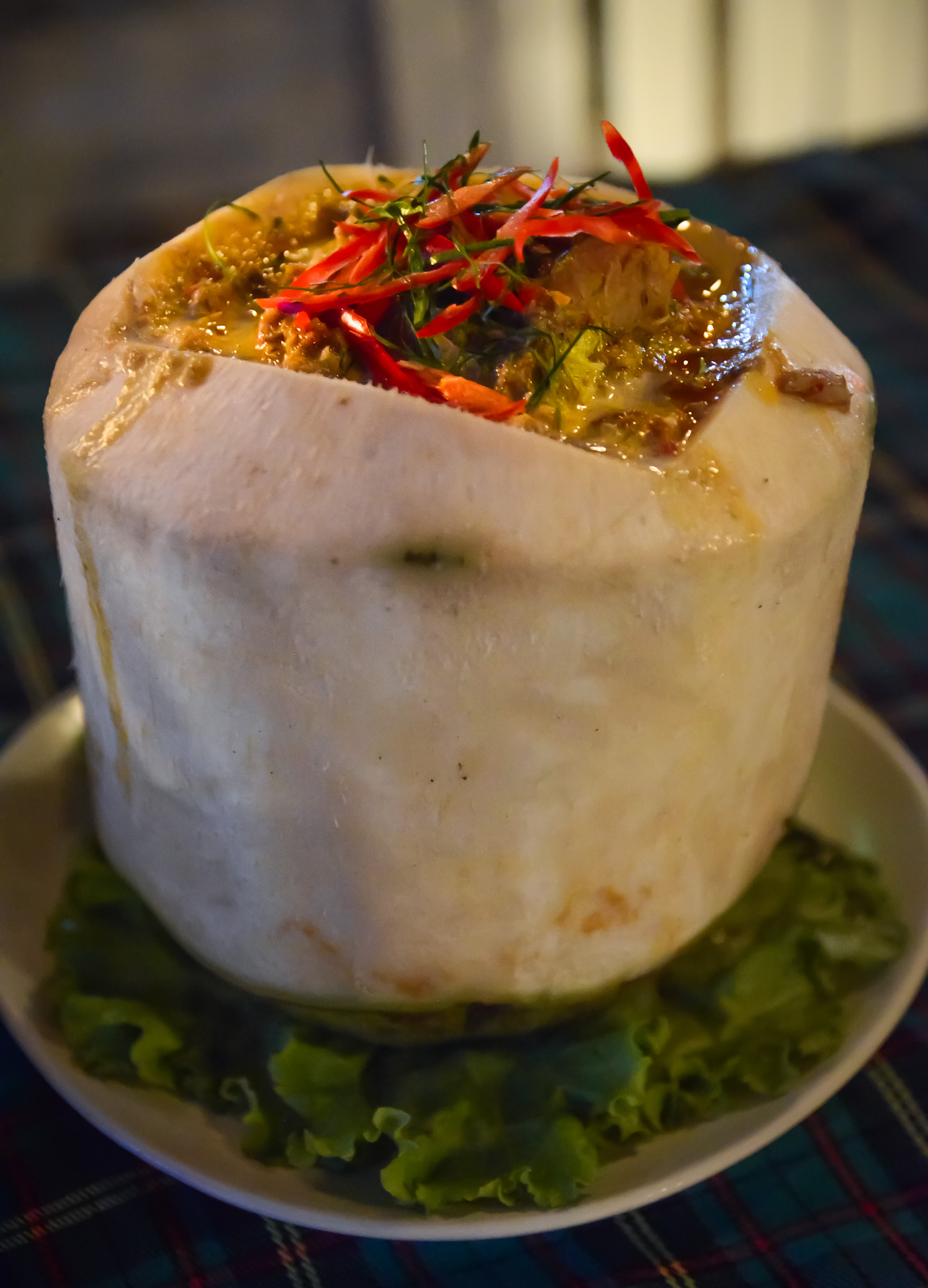
Thai steamed seafood curry (ho mok thale) served in a coconut

Curry paste, also known as prik kaeng (Thai: พริกแกง) in Thai cuisine, is an essential ingredient for preparing steamed curry dishes.

- Steamed fish curry: Ho mok pla, Mok pla (Isan) (Thai: ห่อหมกปลา, หมกปลา).
- Steamed bamboo shoot curry: Ho mok nor mai, Mok nor mai (Isan) (Thai: ห่อหมกหน่อไม้, หมกหน่อไม้).
- Steamed chicken curry: Ho mok kai, Mok kai (Isan) (Thai: ห่อหมกไก่, หมกไก่).
- Steamed Asian green mussel curry: Ho mok hoy ma laeng phu (Thai: ห่อหมกหอยแมลงภู่).
- Steamed clown knifefish curry: Ho mok pla grai (Thai: ห่อหมกปลากราย).
- Steamed tofu curry: Ho mok tauhu, Mok tauhu (Isan) (Thai: ห่อหมกเต้าหู้).

=== Xishuangbanna Dai Autonomous Prefecture ===
- Dai Banana leaf fish (steamed or grilled with paste): Xianjiao ye kao yu (Chinese: 香蕉叶烤鱼) or Ho nung pla

== See also ==
- Otak-otak, similar fish dumpling, a Nyonya Peranakan cuisine common in Malaysia, Singapore and Indonesia
- Pepes, Indonesian dish cooking method by wrapping in banana leafs
- Botok, similar Indonesian Javanese dish wrapped in banana leaf
