= Prahok =

Cambodian salted and fermented fish paste

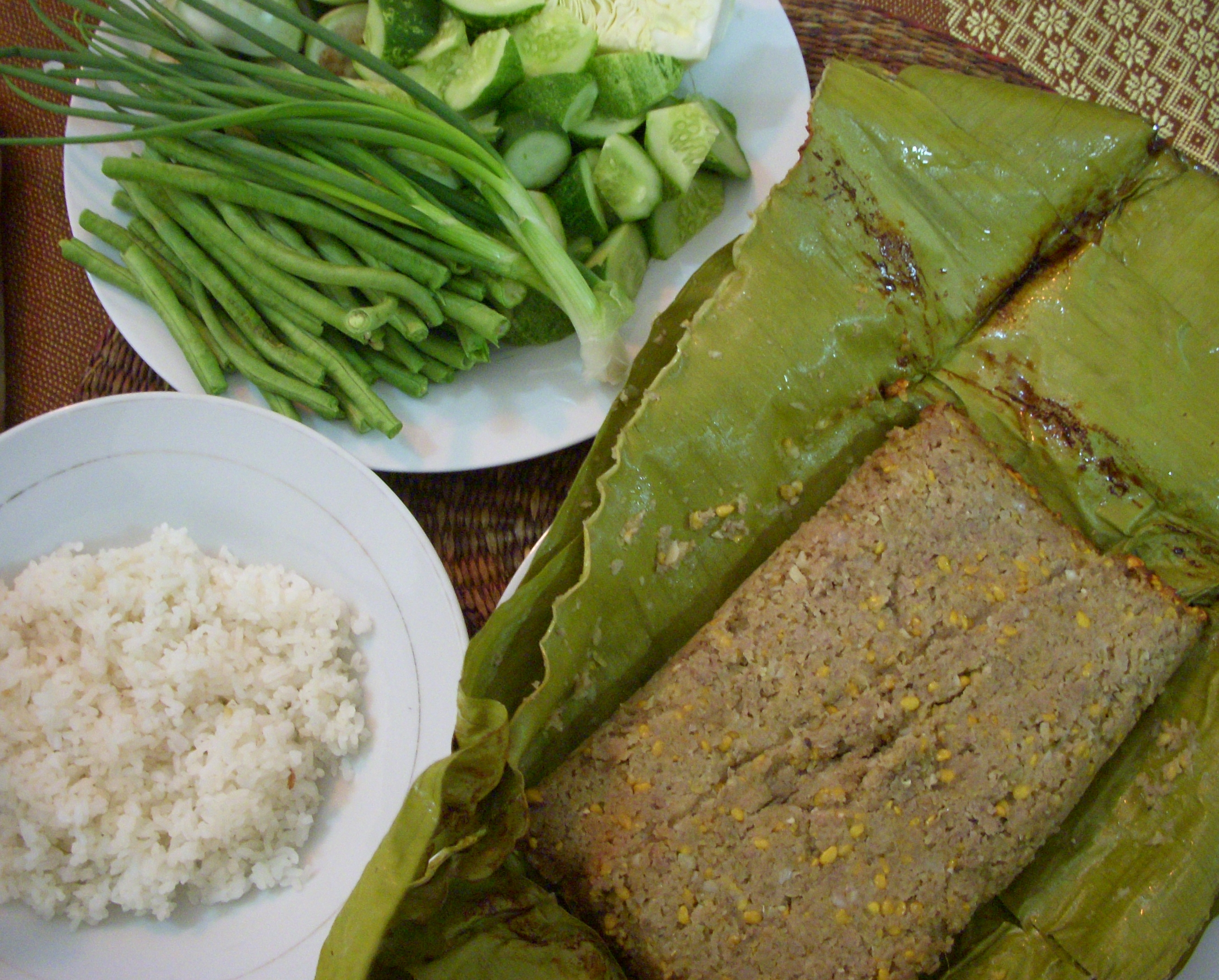
- Prahok wrapped in banana leaves and grilled and served with fresh green vegetables and steamed rice.
- Alternative names: prahoc, prohok, prohoc
- Place of origin: Cambodia
- Region or state: Southeast Asia
- Associated cuisine: Cambodian
- Main ingredients: fermented fish and salt
- Food energy (per serving): 125 kcal (520 kJ)
Nutritional value
(per serving)
- Protein: 32 g
- Fat: 24 g
- Carbohydrate: 43 g
- Similar dishes: ngapi, bagoong, pla ra, padaek

Prahok (/ˈprɑːhʊk/; Khmer: ប្រហុក, romanized: prâhŏk, IPA: [prɑːhok]) is a salted and fermented fish paste (usually of mudfish) used in Cambodian cuisine as a seasoning or a condiment. It originated as a way of preserving fish during the time of the year when fresh fish was not available in abundant supply. Because of its saltiness and strong flavor, it was used as an addition to many meals in Cambodian cuisine, including soups and sauces.

== Production ==
There at least two production methods for prahok, differing primarily in the fish species used. The first method uses Cyprinidae, such as Rasbora and Thynnichthys, while the second method uses snakehead and other larger fish.

Processing begins with the removal of the head, followed by trampling of the fish by foot to remove scales and press out entrails. The fish are then thoroughly washed and stirred until by hand to finish descaling, after which excess water is pressed out. The fish are then placed in baskets, the surface of which is covered with banana leaves and weighted with stones for approximately 24 hours.

The next day, the fish are mixed with coarse salt for about 30 minutes, spread on mats and dried in the sun for one day. The salted and dried product is then repacked into baskets. The next stage, usually carried out in village households, involves pounding small portions of the fish with pestles in wooden mortars for about 20 minutes, with additional salt added to taste.

The resulting paste is transferred to open earthenware jars, which are placed in the sun during the day and covered in the evening to prevent insect contamination. During fermentation, or ripening, a liquid gradually accumulates on the surface of the paste. This liquid, which is removed daily, is used as fish sauce. Fermentation typically lasts about one month. When no more liquid forms, the prahok is considered fully matured and ready for consumption.

== Chemical composition ==
Early fermentation prahok contains 334 g/kg of protein, which decreases to 248–249 g/kg after one month due to proteolysis. The predominant amino acids in prahok are glutamic acid (1.49–2.93 g/kg), alanine (1.75–2.9 g/kg), valine (1.23–1.83 g/kg), leucine (2.27–3.40 g/kg), and lysine (1.13–3.67 g/kg). Unlike kapi and teuk trey, prahok does not contain a high concentration of aspartic acid. The most common organic acids in prahok are acetic acid (2.29–7.24 g/kg), lactic acid (0.39–1.14 g/kg) and succinic acid (0.30–1.26 g/kg).

The early fermentation prahok has a high content of crude fat (151 g/kg), which drops significantly (to 1.7–10.7 g/kg) after degutting in later stages. Due to the decomposition of fish bone and other structures by microorganisms during the fermentation prahok has a greater content of calcium and phosphorus than the fresh fish used.

== Use ==
Prahok has a strong and distinct odor reminiscent of Limburger or ripe Camembert, which has earned it the nickname "Cambodian cheese". A Cambodian saying goes, "No prahok, no salt," referring to a dish lacking in flavour, highlighting its essentiality in Cambodian cuisine.

In rural Cambodia, plain prahok is commonly eaten with steamed rice, serving as an important source of protein in local diets otherwise dominated by rice. It is also widely used as a flavoring in soups, including samlor kako. Prahok is a key component of fish amok. In addition, it is used in dipping sauces such as prahok ktis, as well as teuk kreung.

In tourist-oriented restaurants in Siem Reap and other cities, prahok is typically used sparingly or omitted altogether from dishes as chefs believe that its strong flavor and aroma might not be well received by foreign visitors. Many note that if dishes were prepared with the same liberal use of prahok typical in Cambodian households, tourists could be put off, which they fear would negatively affect business.

=== Prahok dishes ===
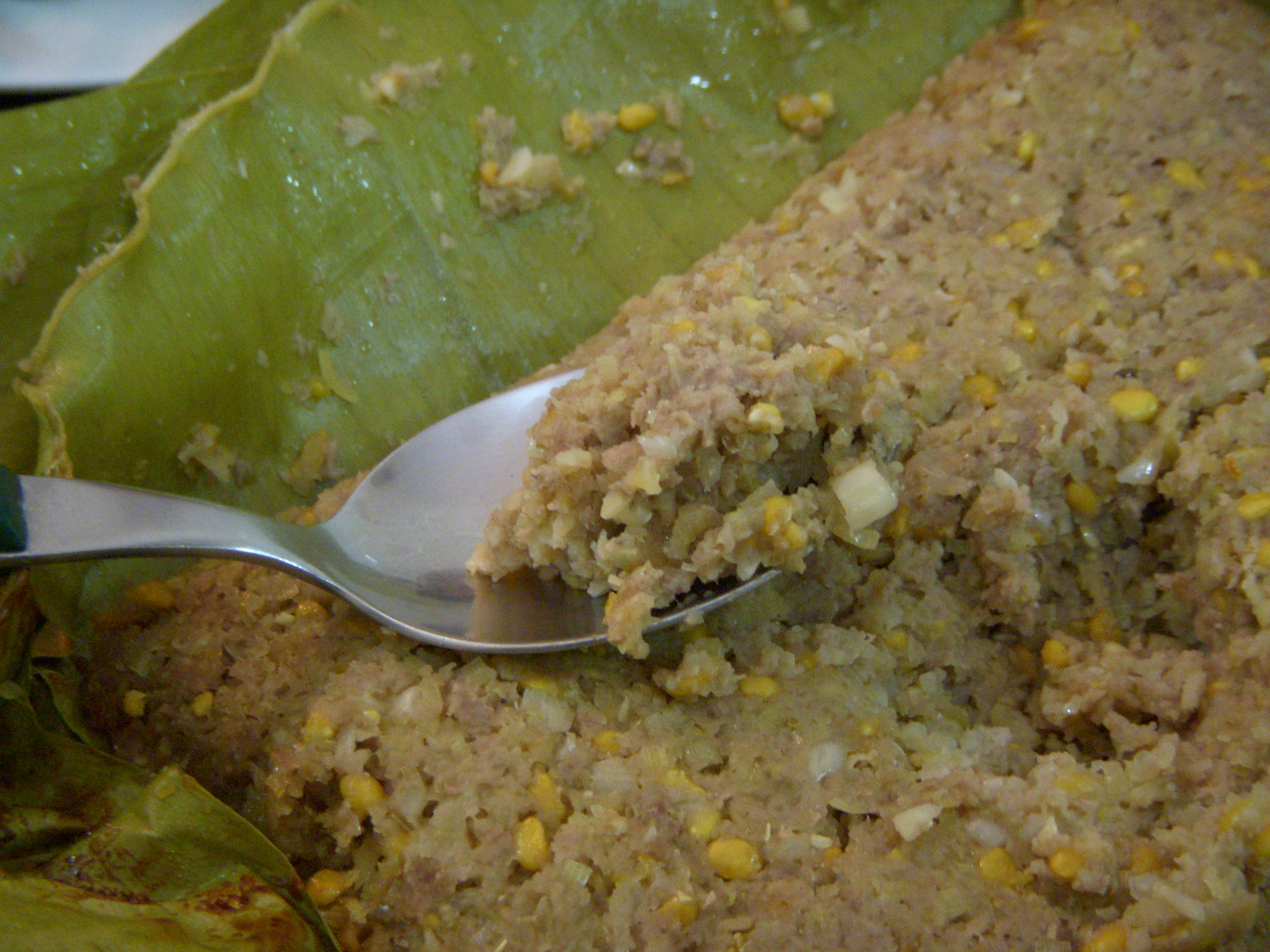
Close up of prahok ang (grilled prahok). Prahok mixed with pork and seasonings, wrapped in banana leaves and roasted

Prahok can be prepared and served in several different ways. Below are dishes where prahok is the main component.

==== Sautéed prahok ====
Prahok chien (ប្រហុកចៀន [prɑːhok ciən]) It is usually mixed with meat (usually beef or pork) and chilli peppers. It can also be eaten as a dip, accompanied by vegetables like cucumbers or eggplants, and rice.

==== Covered prahok ====
Prahok kab (ប្រហុកកប់ [prɑːhok kɑp]) or prahok ang (ប្រហុកអាំង [prɑːhok ʔaŋ]), types of prahok that are covered with banana leaves and left to cook under pieces of rock beneath a fire or over the coals.

==== Raw prahok ====
Prahok chhau (ប្រហុកឆៅ [prɑːhok cʰaw]) is a type of prahok can be used to make a paste with lemon grass, lime juice, fresh peppers, and eggplant eaten with (usually cooked rare) beef steak. Also, this is the type of prahok preferably used as a dipping paste for vegetables and fruits.

== See also ==
- Bagoong – Type of Philippine condiment
- Fish sauce – Condiment made from fish
- Narezushi – Japanese dish with vinegared rice
- Ngapi – Seafood paste used in Burmese cuisine
- Padaek – Lao pickled or fermented fish condiment
- Pla ra – Southeast Asian fermented fish seasoning
- Saeu-jeot – Fermented shrimp in Korean cuisine
- Shrimp paste – Fermented condiment
