= Kroeung =

Khmer culinary term

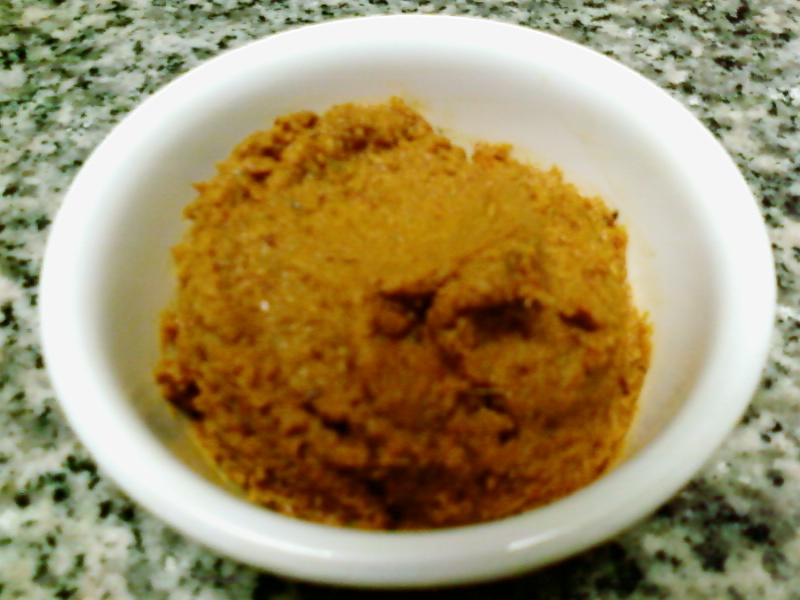
The result of freshly pounded spices, red kroeung

Kroeung (Khmer: គ្រឿង, romanized: krœăng, IPA: [krɨəŋ]) is a word for a number of spice/herb pastes that make up the base flavors of many Khmer dishes. Such dishes are often dubbed with the "-kroeung" suffix. Kroeung is traditionally made by finely chopping the ingredients and grinding them together using a heavy mortar and pestle although mechanical food processors can be used in modern kitchens. Various ingredients, depending on the dish and the taste of the cook, can be pounded into kroeung. The eight most commonly used are lemongrass, magrut lime zest and leaves, galangal, turmeric, garlic, shallots, dried red chillies and various rhizomes (lesser galangal, fingerroot, Kaempferia galanga, etc.). This herbal paste is essential for preparing Khmer dishes in order to create the authentic flavour.

Kroeung has two main categories: "individual kroeung" and "royal kroeung". Individual kroeung are dishes which may call for extra ingredients specific to the dish, resulting in a unique-use kroeung. Royal kroeung on the other hand is fairly standardized. The various types of kroeung can be further distinguished by their colors, specifically, yellow, green and red. The color kroeung are commonly used to make stuffings, soup, and stir-fry.

== Individual kroeung ==
Kroeung that are pounded for specific single dishes or have only one unique use falls into this category. Individual Kroeung also consists of extra ingredients not found in its base recipe. Samlar kakou, for example, requires roasted ground rice for the smoky flavor of the soup. The Kroeung in fish amok is considered an individual kroeung since it uses the red kroeung base but omits Turmeric in favor of Kaffir lime leaves. Traditionally, kroeung recipes, specifically for curries, requires whole spices to be ground with the herb paste. However, curry powder can also be used in place of the whole spices, in which case the kroeung would also be considered individual kroeung.

== Royal kroeung ==
Royal kroeung is based on the kroeung used for royal dishes. The difference between royal and individual kroeung is the extra ingredients sometimes used to make the paste, coriander and Kaffir Lime leaves (instead of zest). Not every royal kroeung makes use of the two extra ingredients, but they are the only additions or substitutions in the original recipe.

Cambodians living abroad use Kaffir lime leaves instead of Kaffir lime zest, which is actually the whole lime rind that has been sun-dried, as Kaffir limes are not widely available outside of Cambodia, and by extension the Southeast Asian region.

== Color kroeung ==
There are three distinct color groups into which all kroeung can be categorized: red, green, and yellow. The dominant herb or spice present in the spice-blend paste tints the three different color kroeung. Uncooked kroeung will often change color as it cooks.

The list of ingredients in these color kroeung will vary by recipe, and there are some ingredients included purely for their coloring ability.

=== Red kroeung ===
The selected herbs and spices that goes into making red kroeung.

Red kroeung (Khmer: គ្រឿងក្រហម, krœăng krâhâm) receives its deep color from a type of dehydrated chili pod which contributes very little flavor to the kroeung and is added solely for the natural red color, although as the dish is meant to be spicy, hotter chilli peppers may also be used in the spice paste. Lemongrass stalks are used in this paste, rather than lemongrass leaves which would impart a green to the dish when cooked. The lemongrass stalk is a pale beige color, so it easily takes on the dominant red hues from the red peppers. The ingredients of red kroeung are:

- Lemongrass stalk (ស្លឹកគ្រៃ, slœ̆k krey)
- Turmeric (រមៀត, rômiĕt)
- Shallot (ខ្ទឹមក្រហម, khtœ̆m krâhâm)
- Garlic (ខ្ទឹមស, khtœ̆m sâ)
- Galangal (រំដេង, rumdéng)
- Dried red pepper (ម្ទេសក្រហមស្ងួត, mtés krâhâm snguŏt)

These ingredients require some advance preparation prior to pounding into this specific kroeung. The dried chili pod must be soaked, seeded, and then drained of excess water. The lemongrass stalks need to be thinly sliced and fresh galangal should be diced. If fresh or brine-soaked turmeric is used, it must be diced as well. Kaffir lime zest must be sliced into thin strips and Kaffir lime leaves require deveining and thinly chopping. The ingredients are then added to the mortar and pounded, usually lime zest/leaves first until smooth, then chili, lemongrass, galangal, and turmeric, until a deep red color is achieved. Lastly, the garlic and shallots are added.

=== Green kroeung ===
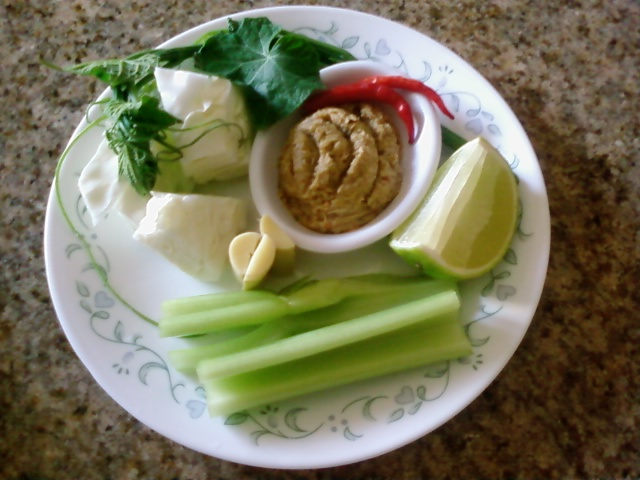
Teuk kroeung (Khmer: ទឹកគ្រឿង), vegetable platter with prahok kroeung dipping paste.

The usual ingredients for a green kroeung are lemongrass (about a three to one ratio of leaves to stalks), rhizome, cinnamon, galangal and turmeric. Prahok can also be added depending on the dish to be made. A version with prahok, minus the cinnamon, is called teuk kroeung and used as a dipping condiment for fresh or slightly blanched vegetables eaten with rice either as a side dish or as a meal in itself.

=== Yellow Kroeung ===
The yellow kroeungs are used often in common everyday dishes, a primary example being the ubiquitous samlor machu kroeung, a stew made with a yellow kroeung base that becomes greenish when cooked, fatty pieces of pork (usually ribs), tralach (winter melon), papaya or tamarind for sourness and trakuon (water spinach). The primary coloring ingredient for yellow kroeung is turmeric. To this is added lemongrass stalks, garlic, shallot and galangal.

== See also ==
- Bumbu
- Thai curry
