= Omnivore (TV series) =

- Promotional poster
- Genre: Documentary
- Created by: René Redzepi; Matt Goulding
- Starring: René Redzepi
- Country of origin: United States
- No. of seasons: 1
- No. of episodes: 8

Production
- Executive producers: René Redzepi; Matt Goulding; Chris Rice
- Production company: Fifth Season

Original release
- Network: Apple TV+
- Release: July 19, 2024

Omnivore is an American documentary series created by René Redzepi and Matt Goulding, that was produced by Fifth Season and premiered on Apple TV+ beginning July 19, 2024. The eight part series features ethnographies of various ingredients, including peppers, pigs, salt, coffee, corn, and rice. The series was partially inspired by Planet Earth and Anthony Bourdain: Parts Unknown.

== Episodes ==
No	Title	Directed	Original release date	Locations
1	"Chile"	Drea Cooper	July 19, 2024	Donja Lokošnica, a village in Serbia known for its paprika; Avery Island, Louisiana, the headquarters of the McIlhenny Company, makers of Tabasco sauce; Bangkok, Thailand, to meet Prin Polsuk and Mint Jarukittikun of Samrub Samrub Thai
2	"Tuna"	Mateo Willis	July 19, 2024	
3	"Salt"	Drea Cooper	July 19, 2024	
4	"Banana"	David Charles Rodrigues	July 19, 2024	Kerala, India to meet Vinod Sahadevan Nair, who owns one of the world's largest private banana collections
5	"Pig"	Isabel Coixet	July 19, 2024	La Alberca, Spain
6	"Rice"	Rintu Thomas	July 19, 2024	Kerala, India to meet with organic farmer Jayakrishnan Thaazhathuveettil, who grows heirloom varieties of rice
7	"Coffee"	Sami Khan	July 19, 2024	Durham, North Carolina, USA for Arthur Karuletwa to taste Rwandan coffee with aligned coffee roaster Areli Barrera Grodski at Little Waves Coffee Roasters.
8	"Corn"	Nicola Marsh	July 19, 2024	

== Reception ==
On the review aggregator website Rotten Tomatoes, 100% of 10 critics' reviews are positive.
