= Kolae (restaurant) =

Thai restaurant in London, England

Kolae is a Thai restaurant in Borough Market, London. The restaurant was founded in October 2023 by Mark Dobbie and Andy Oliver, co-founders of Som Saa in Shoreditch. The restaurant has 80 covers and is split over 3 levels.

Taking influence from Southern Thai cuisine, Kolae takes its name from and specialises in the 'kolae' technique of marinating and grilling.

== History ==
Andy Oliver and Mark Dobbie first met in London in 2009 working at Nahm under David Thompson. Oliver, Dobbie, and co-founder Tom George opened som saa as a year-long pop-up in London Fields in 2014. Andy Oliver and Mark Dobbie then went on to open Kolae in October 2023, in what was once an old coach house.

== Reception ==
The restaurant has received good reviews from food critics from the Financial Times, The Standard, and The Telegraph.

Kolae placed at number 33 in the National Restaurant Awards in 2025, and was awarded a Michelin Bib Gourmand in 2025. The restaurant is also on the World's 50 Best Discovery list.
