= Pim Techamuanvivit =

Thai chef and restaurateur

- พิม เตชะมวลไววิทย์
- Born: 1971 (age 54–55)
- Occupations: Chef, restaurateur, blogger

Pim Techamuanvivit (Thai: พิม เตชะมวลไววิทย์; RTGS: Phim Techamuanwaiwit; born 1971) is a Thai chef and restaurateur based in San Francisco. She is the owner of Michelin-starred Nari, Kamin, and Michelin-starred Kin Khao restaurants in San Francisco, and became the executive chef of Michelin-starred Nahm in Bangkok in 2019.

== Early life and education ==
Techamuanvivit was born and grew up in Bangkok. She arrived in the United States to attend graduate school at the University of California, San Diego, and worked for Netscape and Cisco Systems after graduating.

== Career ==
She began blogging in 2001, and her blog, Chez Pim, became a popular food blog in the early days of the Blogger platform.

In 2009, Techamuanvivit published a book, The Foodie Handbook, to mixed reviews.

Techamuanvivit gradually turned her attention toward cooking, first starting a jam business, then focusing on Thai food, learning family recipes from her aunt during visits to home in Thailand. She opened Kin Khao in San Francisco in 2014, which received one Michelin Star a year later. In 2018, she was approached to take over from Prin Polsuk as head chef at Nahm, a Michelin-starred restaurant founded by David Thompson in Bangkok. She opened Kamin, a takeout restaurant in San Francisco Airport, and Nari, a larger restaurant also in San Francisco, in 2019.
