= Kimsan Twins =

Cambodian chefs

Pol Kimsan (Khmer: ប៉ុល គឹមសាន; born 1984 in Kampot Province, Cambodia) and Sok Kimsan (សុខ គឹមសាន; born 1986 in Siem Reap province), together known as the Kimsan Twins, are Cambodian chefs and restaurateurs, executive chefs of the Angkor W Group of Restaurants. Despite their sobriquet and shared last name, they are not actually twins or even biologically related.

== Biography ==
Pol Kimsan first started cooking at the age of ten and comes from a long line of village cooks. In 2002, Pol Kimsan moved from Kampot to Siem Reap to forego a nine month long training at the Paul Dubrule Vocational School in Hospitality and Tourism before starting to work at the French bistro at Angkor Victoria Hotel.

Sok Kimsan, on the other hand, was initially studying to become a nurse but at the age of 18 was forced to drop out of school when her parents could not afford her study supplies anymore. In 2002, she enrolled in the Sala Baï Hotel and Restaurant School after her older brother heard about the school opening on the radio. Upon graduation, Sok Kimsan started working at the Belmond La Residence d’Angkor Hotel. She then worked at the Grand Hyatt Dubai for two years before moving to France to work for Les Enfants Perdus and Restaurant Regis & Jacques Marcon and returning to Cambodia in 2008. In 2013, Sok was one of the four chefs representing Cambodia at the Thailand Ultimate Chef Challenge and Pattaya City Culinary Cup.

Pol and Sok became friends while they both were working as cooks at the Victoria Angkor Resort. In 2014, the Kimsan Twins became the executive chefs of the newly opened Cambodian restaurant Embassy on King's Road in Siem Reap with an all-female staff. To design the restaurant's menu they studied the national archives for forgotten recipes and received training from a former member of King Norodom Sihanouk's cooking staff. In 2015, they were the guest judges of Cambodian Television Network's "Cambodian Best Chef Phnom Penh" contest. In 2020, Embassy was included in the Asia's 50 Best Restaurants newly created 50 Best Discovery list. In 2021, the Kimsan Twins also started managing the newly opened Sombok Restaurant in Phnom Penh. In 2022, the Kimsan Twins catered for the first-ever Cambodia Night in the World Economic Forum in Davos.
