= Joannès Rivière =

French chef

- Born: 1979 (age 46–47); Roanne, France
- Culinary career
- Cooking style: Cambodian cuisine
- Current restaurant
- Cuisine Wat Damnak

Joannès "Jo" Rivière is a French chef, restaurateur and cookbook author specializing in Cambodian cuisine. He has been regarded as the leading Western authority on Cambodian food.

== Biography ==
Rivière was born and grew up in Roanne, France. He recalls his Christmas family dinners being a mix of French and Southeast Asian dishes, such as larp, which was introduced by his uncle who had worked as a pilot in Cambodia in the 1970s. Rivière learned cooking while working in his family restaurant. After graduating from a culinary school in France, Rivière worked as a pastry chef in Nantucket and Philadelphia in the United States for two years.

Having to do military service, Rivière opted for civic service instead and moved to Cambodia in August 2003 to work as a volunteer culinary teacher and restaurant manager for the non-profit Sala Baï Hotel and Restaurant School in Siem Reap. To raise funds for the school, he wrote a Cambodian cookbook La cuisine du Cambodge avec les aprentis de Sala Bai, which was published in 2005 and sold more than 8,000 copies in France. Rivière confessed initially not being impressed by the Cambodian cuisine but becoming interested in it when doing the book.

Cambodian food has changed my cooking style in many ways. The idea of mixing meat and fish, the idea of over or under cooking something on purpose, or even the idea of doing an entire meal without dairy, has changed my way of running a kitchen.

— Joannès Rivière,

In 2005, he started working at the Hotel de la Paix's Meric as an executive sous-chef. In 2008, Periplus Publishing Group released an English-language version of his Cambodian cookbook titled "Cambodian Cooking: A humanitarian project in collaboration with Act for Cambodia". In 2010, when Rivière was planning to return to France he met David Thompson who had eaten at the hotel Rivière was working at. Impressed by his use of lesser-known local ingredients Thompson encouraged Rivière to stay in Cambodia and open a restaurant of his own.

=== Cuisine Wat Damnak ===
In 2011, together with his partner Carole Salmon, Rivière opened Cuisine Wat Damnak, taking its name from the nearby Wat Damnak pagoda, serving Cambodian cuisine with a focus on lesser-known dishes. The restaurant changes its menu every two weeks to include the ingredients locally available at the moment. In 2015, Cuisine Wat Damnak was included in the 50th position of Asia's 50 Best Restaurants, becoming the first Cambodian restaurant to make the list. In the 2016 list Cuisine Wat Damnak rose to the 43rd position.

In 2018, Rivière became business partners with Cambodian hospitality specialist Nguon Vengchhay and opened Cuisine Wat Damnak at the No 29 Street 228 of Doun Penh Section in Phnom Penh in March 2021. The restaurant in Siem Reap was closed due to the COVID-19 pandemic, but reopened on 1 October 2022. In 2022, Cuisine Wat Damnak restaurants in Phnom Penh and Siem Reap were included in the No. 2 spot of the online travel magazine's Travel + Leisure "Asia’s Best Awards 2022 – Best Of Cambodia" category "Best Restaurants in Cambodia".

== Books ==
- Joannès Rivière, Dominique De Bourgknecht, David Lallemand (2005). La Cuisine du Cambodge avec les apprentis de Sala Baï. Philippe Picquier Publishing ISBN 978-2-877-30816-8
- Joannès Rivière, Dominique De Bourgknecht, David Lallemand (2008). Cambodian Cooking: A humanitarian project in collaboration with Act for Cambodia. Periplus Editions. ISBN 978-0-794-65039-1.
