= Charmgang =

Charmgang ชามแกง

Restaurant information
- Established: 2019
- Chef: Geravich "Mew" Mesaengnilverakul; Atcharapon "Aew" Kiatthanawat; Aruss "Jai" Lerlerstkull
- Location: 14, Soi Charoen Krung 35, Talat Noi, Samphanthawong district, Bangkok, Thailand

Charmgang (Thai: ชามแกง; RTGS: Chamkaeng) is a restaurant in Chinatown, Bangkok, Thailand, specializing in Thai curries opened in 2019. Led by chefs Geravich "Mew" Mesaengnilverakul, Atcharapon "Aew" Kiatthanawat, and Aruss "Jai" Lerlerstkull, the restaurant is a modern take on the raan khao gaeng (Thai: ร้านข้าวแกง), a restaurant that serves curry and rice with accompaniments. All three chefs have previously worked with David Thompson, the owner of Nahm. Its interiors were designed by Saran Yen Panya.

In 2023, Lerlerstkull launched Charmkrung, a spin-off wine bar on Charoen Krung Road serving small plates.
