= List of Michelin-starred restaurants in Thailand =

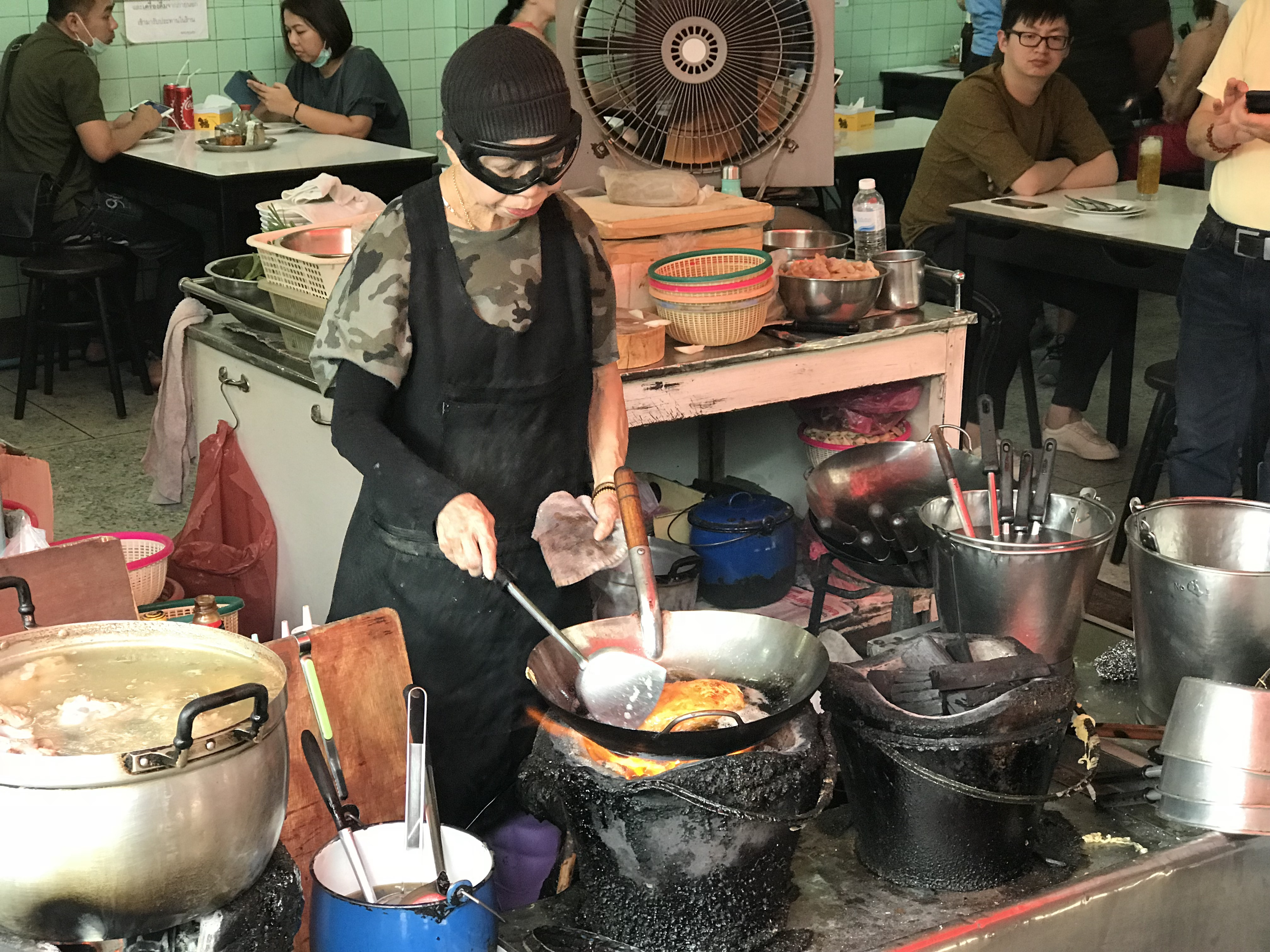
Jay Fai cooking at the restaurant of the same name in Bangkok in 2018

In the 2027 Michelin Guide, there are 53 restaurants in Thailand with a Michelin-star rating.

The Michelin Guides have been published by the French tire company Michelin since 1900. They were designed as a guide to tell drivers about which eateries they should visit and to subtly sponsor their tires. This was done by encouraging drivers to use their cars more and therefore need to replace the tires as they wore out. Over time Michelin stars became more valuable.

Before a star is given, multiple anonymous Michelin inspectors visit the restaurants several times. They rate the restaurants on five criteria: "quality of products", "mastery of flavor and cooking techniques", "the personality of the chef represented in the dining experience", "harmony of flavor", and "consistency between inspectors' visits". Inspectors have at least ten years of expertise and create a list of popular restaurants supported by media reports, reviews, and diner popularity, for them to inspect. If the Michelin inspectors who have eaten at the restaurant reach a consensus, Michelin awards the restaurant from one to three stars. One star means "high-quality cooking, worth a stop", two stars signify "excellent cooking, worth a detour", and three stars denote "exceptional cuisine, worth a special journey". The stars are not permanent and restaurants are re-evaluated every year. If the criteria are not met, the restaurant will lose its stars.

The 2018 edition was the inaugural edition of the Michelin Guide in Thailand, initially only covering Bangkok. It was the seventh Asian city or region to have a dedicated Guide. The Guide was funded with 144 million Thai Baht (US$4,456,000) over five years by the Tourism Authority of Thailand. The funding was also part of an effort to increase street food's recognition in the guide. Michelin expanded its Thailand coverage over several years: Phuket and Phang-Nga in 2019, Chiang Mai in 2020, Ayutthaya in 2022, four northeastern provinces (Nakhon Ratchasima, Ubon Ratchathani, Udon Thani, and Khon Kaen) in 2023, and most recently Chonburi in the 2025 edition. (Note: A restaurant that is not starred can still be in the guide, hence why some of the regions listed are not represented in the table.)

== List ==
Key
1 Michelin star	One Michelin star
2 Michelin stars	Two Michelin stars
3 Michelin stars	Three Michelin stars
—	The restaurant did not receive a star that year
Closed	The restaurant is no longer open

Michelin-starred restaurants
Restaurant	Cuisine	Location (province) (Note: Thailand is divided into 76 provinces and two special administrative areas: the capital Bangkok and the city of Pattaya, with Bangkok also being at the provincial-level and often counted as the 77th province.)	2018	2019	2020	2021	2022	2023	2024	2025	2026	2027
80/20	Thai	Bangkok	—	—	1 Michelin star	1 Michelin star	1 Michelin star	1 Michelin star	1 Michelin star	1 Michelin star	1 Michelin star	1 Michelin star
Akkee	Thai	Nonthaburi	—	—	—	—	—	—	—	1 Michelin star	1 Michelin star	1 Michelin star
Aksorn	Thai	Bangkok	—	—	—	—	1 Michelin star	1 Michelin star	1 Michelin star	1 Michelin star	1 Michelin star	1 Michelin star
Aulis	Thai	Phang Nga	—	—	—	—	—	—	—	1 Michelin star	1 Michelin star	1 Michelin star
Avant	Modern	Bangkok	—	—	—	—	—	—	—	1 Michelin star	1 Michelin star	1 Michelin star
Baan Tepa	Thai	Bangkok	—	—	—	—	—	1 Michelin star	2 Michelin stars	2 Michelin stars	2 Michelin stars	2 Michelin stars
Belén	European	Chiang Mai	—	—	—	—	—	—	—	—	—	1 Michelin star
Blue by Alain Ducasse	French	Bangkok	—	—	—	1 Michelin star	1 Michelin star	1 Michelin star	1 Michelin star	1 Michelin star	1 Michelin star	2 Michelin stars
Bo.lan	Thai	Bangkok	1 Michelin star	1 Michelin star	1 Michelin star	1 Michelin star	Closed				1 Michelin star	1 Michelin star
Cadence by Dan Bark	Creative	Bangkok	—	—	—	1 Michelin star	1 Michelin star	1 Michelin star	1 Michelin star	—	—	—
Cannubi by Umberto Bombana	Italian	Bangkok	—	—	—	—	—	—	—	—	1 Michelin star	1 Michelin star
Canvas	Spanish	Bangkok	—	1 Michelin star	1 Michelin star	1 Michelin star	1 Michelin star	1 Michelin star	1 Michelin star	—	—	Closed
Chef's Table	French	Bangkok	—	—	1 Michelin star	2 Michelin stars	2 Michelin stars	2 Michelin stars	2 Michelin stars	2 Michelin stars	2 Michelin stars	2 Michelin stars
China House	Cantonese	Bangkok	—	—	—	—	—	—	—	—	—	1 Michelin star
Chim by Siam Wisdom	Thai	Bangkok	1 Michelin star	1 Michelin star	1 Michelin star	1 Michelin star	1 Michelin star	1 Michelin star	1 Michelin star	1 Michelin star	1 Michelin star	1 Michelin star
Coda	Thai	Bangkok	—	—	—	—	—	—	—	1 Michelin star	1 Michelin star	1 Michelin star
Côte by Mauro Colagreco	French	Bangkok	—	—	—	—	1 Michelin star	1 Michelin star	1 Michelin star	2 Michelin stars	2 Michelin stars	2 Michelin stars
Duet by David Toutain	French	Bangkok	—	—	—	—	—	—	—	—	—	1 Michelin star
Elements	French	Bangkok	1 Michelin star	1 Michelin star	1 Michelin star	1 Michelin star	1 Michelin star	1 Michelin star	1 Michelin star	1 Michelin star	1 Michelin star	1 Michelin star
etcha	Creative	Bangkok	—	—	—	—	—	—	—	—	1 Michelin star	1 Michelin star
Gaa	Indian	Bangkok	—	1 Michelin star	1 Michelin star	Closed	1 Michelin star	1 Michelin star	2 Michelin stars	2 Michelin stars	2 Michelin stars	2 Michelin stars
Gaggan	Indian	Bangkok	2 Michelin stars	2 Michelin stars	Closed						1 Michelin star	1 Michelin star
Ginza Sushi Ichi	Japanese	Bangkok	1 Michelin star	1 Michelin star	1 Michelin star	1 Michelin star	1 Michelin star	—	—	—	—	—
Goat	Thai	Bangkok	—	—	—	—	—	—	—	1 Michelin star	1 Michelin star	1 Michelin star
Haoma	Indian	Bangkok	—	—	—	—	—	1 Michelin star	1 Michelin star	1 Michelin star	1 Michelin star	1 Michelin star
I-Sang	Korean	Bangkok	—	—	—	—	—	—	—	—	—	1 Michelin star
Igniv	Contemporary	Bangkok	—	—	—	—	1 Michelin star	1 Michelin star	1 Michelin star	1 Michelin star	1 Michelin star	1 Michelin star
Inddee	Indian	Bangkok	—	—	—	—	—	—	1 Michelin star	1 Michelin star	2 Michelin stars	2 Michelin stars
J'aime by Jean-Michel Lorain	French	Bangkok	1 Michelin star	1 Michelin star	1 Michelin star	1 Michelin star	1 Michelin star	1 Michelin star	—	—	—	Closed
Jaras	Thai	Phuket	—	—	—	—	—	—	—	—	—	1 Michelin star
Jay Fai	Thai	Bangkok	1 Michelin star	1 Michelin star	1 Michelin star	1 Michelin star	1 Michelin star	1 Michelin star	1 Michelin star	1 Michelin star	1 Michelin star	1 Michelin star
Juksunchae	Korean	Bangkok	—	—	—	—	—	—	—	—	1 Michelin star	1 Michelin star
Khao (Vadhana)	Thai	Bangkok	—	—	1 Michelin star	1 Michelin star	1 Michelin star	1 Michelin star	1 Michelin star	—	—	Closed
L'Atelier de Joël Robuchon	French	Bangkok	1 Michelin star	1 Michelin star	Closed							
Le Du	Thai	Bangkok	—	1 Michelin star	1 Michelin star	1 Michelin star	1 Michelin star	1 Michelin star	1 Michelin star	1 Michelin star	1 Michelin star	1 Michelin star
Le Normandie	French	Bangkok	2 Michelin stars	2 Michelin stars	2 Michelin stars	2 Michelin stars	2 Michelin stars	2 Michelin stars	1 Michelin star	1 Michelin star	2 Michelin stars	2 Michelin stars
Liana	French	Bangkok	—	—	—	—	—	—	—	—	—	1 Michelin star
Machri	Thai	Bangkok	—	—	—	—	—	—	—	—	—	1 Michelin star
Maison Dunand	French	Bangkok	—	—	—	—	—	1 Michelin star	1 Michelin star	1 Michelin star	1 Michelin star	1 Michelin star
Methavalai Sorndaeng	Thai	Bangkok	—	1 Michelin star	1 Michelin star	1 Michelin star	1 Michelin star	1 Michelin star	—	—	—	—
Mezzaluna	French	Bangkok	2 Michelin stars	2 Michelin stars	2 Michelin stars	2 Michelin stars	2 Michelin stars	2 Michelin stars	2 Michelin stars	2 Michelin stars	2 Michelin stars	2 Michelin stars
Mia	Contemporary	Bangkok	—	—	—	—	—	—	1 Michelin star	1 Michelin star	1 Michelin star	2 Michelin stars
Nahm	Thai	Bangkok	1 Michelin star	1 Michelin star	1 Michelin star	1 Michelin star	1 Michelin star	1 Michelin star	1 Michelin star	1 Michelin star	1 Michelin star	1 Michelin star
Nawa	Thai	Bangkok	—	—	—	—	—	—	1 Michelin star	1 Michelin star	1 Michelin star	1 Michelin star
Nusara	Thai	Bangkok	—	—	—	—	—	—	—	—	1 Michelin star	1 Michelin star
Omemo	Swiss	Phuket	—	—	—	—	—	—	—	—	—	1 Michelin star
Paste	Thai	Bangkok	1 Michelin star	1 Michelin star	1 Michelin star	1 Michelin star	1 Michelin star	1 Michelin star	—	—	—	—
Potong	Asian	Bangkok	—	—	—	—	—	1 Michelin star	1 Michelin star	1 Michelin star	1 Michelin star	1 Michelin star
Pru	Modern	Phuket	—	1 Michelin star	1 Michelin star	1 Michelin star	1 Michelin star	1 Michelin star	1 Michelin star	1 Michelin star	1 Michelin star	2 Michelin stars
R-Haan	Thai	Bangkok	—	—	2 Michelin stars	2 Michelin stars	2 Michelin stars	2 Michelin stars	2 Michelin stars	2 Michelin stars	2 Michelin stars	1 Michelin star
Resonance	Modern	Bangkok	—	—	—	—	—	—	1 Michelin star	1 Michelin star	1 Michelin star	1 Michelin star
Ruean Panya	Thai	Samut Sakhon	—	1 Michelin star	1 Michelin star	—	—	—	—	—	—	—
Saawaan	Thai	Bangkok	—	1 Michelin star	1 Michelin star	1 Michelin star	1 Michelin star	—	—	—	—	—
Samrub Samrub Thai	Thai	Bangkok	—	—	—	—	—	—	1 Michelin star	1 Michelin star	1 Michelin star	1 Michelin star
Saneh Jaan	Thai	Bangkok	1 Michelin star	1 Michelin star	1 Michelin star	1 Michelin star	1 Michelin star	1 Michelin star	1 Michelin star	1 Michelin star	1 Michelin star	1 Michelin star
Sartoria	Italian	Bangkok	—	—	—	—	—	—	—	—	—	1 Michelin star
Savelberg	French	Bangkok	1 Michelin star	1 Michelin star	1 Michelin star	1 Michelin star	1 Michelin star	1 Michelin star	—	—	—	—
Sorn	Thai	Bangkok	—	1 Michelin star	2 Michelin stars	2 Michelin stars	2 Michelin stars	2 Michelin stars	2 Michelin stars	3 Michelin stars	3 Michelin stars	3 Michelin stars
Signature	French	Bangkok	—	—	—	—	—	1 Michelin star	1 Michelin star	1 Michelin star	1 Michelin star	1 Michelin star
Sra Bua by Kiin Kiin	Thai	Bangkok	1 Michelin star	1 Michelin star	1 Michelin star	1 Michelin star	1 Michelin star	1 Michelin star	—	—	—	Closed
Suan Thip	Thai	Nonthaburi	—	1 Michelin star	1 Michelin star	1 Michelin star	1 Michelin star	1 Michelin star	1 Michelin star	1 Michelin star	1 Michelin star	1 Michelin star
Sühring	German	Bangkok	1 Michelin star	2 Michelin stars	2 Michelin stars	2 Michelin stars	2 Michelin stars	2 Michelin stars	2 Michelin stars	2 Michelin stars	3 Michelin stars	3 Michelin stars
Sushi Masato	Japanese	Bangkok	—	—	—	1 Michelin star	1 Michelin star	1 Michelin star	1 Michelin star	—	—	—
Sushi Saito	Japanese	Bangkok	—	—	—	—	—	—	—	—	1 Michelin star	1 Michelin star
Table 38	Thai	Bangkok	—	—	1 Michelin star	Closed						
Tharn	Thai	Bangkok	—	—	—	—	—	—	—	—	—	1 Michelin star
Upstairs	Contemporary	Bangkok	1 Michelin star	1 Michelin star	1 Michelin star	Closed						
Wana Yook	Thai	Bangkok	—	—	—	—	—	—	1 Michelin star	1 Michelin star	1 Michelin star	1 Michelin star
Yu Ting Yuan	Chinese	Bangkok	—	—	—	—	1 Michelin star	1 Michelin star	—	—	—	—
References												

== Criticism ==
Following the arrival of the Michelin Guide in Thailand, some figures in the country's culinary scene have expressed concern about its influence on Thai cuisine. Jarrett Wrisley, proprietor of Bangkok restaurants Soul Food Mahanakorn, Appia, and Peppina, criticized the guide for what he described as the 'corruption' of Thai food, citing increasingly predictable menus and the role of sponsorships. However, several Michelin-starred chefs in Thailand have disagreed with this view, arguing that Thai cuisine has not been diminished, and that modern interpretations can still preserve traditional elements. Jay Fai, owner of the eponymous restaurant, has expressed regret over receiving a Michelin star, stating that many customers visit merely to take photographs rather than to enjoy the food.

== See also ==
- List of Michelin Bib Gourmand restaurants in Thailand
- List of Thai restaurants
