= Long Seam =

Cambodian epigraphist

Long Seam or Long Siem is a Cambodian historian and linguist and specialist of Khmer epigraphy, who was known as "the man who could talk to stones" and is considered the second greatest scholar in Cambodian history after the late Chuon Nath.

== Biography ==
=== Education in Cambodia ===
Long Seam was born on July 15, 1935, in Thla village, Chraneang commune, Baray district, Kampong Thom province. His father was called Long Chrek and his mother's name was Rath Sorn.

After his certificate of primary studies, he entered the Normal School of Phnom Penh and after four years of schooling he obtained the diploma of secondary studies. Then he entered the Institute of Pedagogy for a year of training and became a teacher. During a few years of work, he passed his entrance examination as a student-teacher at the National Institute of Pedagogy where he received training in Khmer language and literature for two years and became a Khmer teacher in various high schools in the Kingdom. At the same time, he continued his studies at the Faculty of Letters at the University of Phnom Penh.

=== Mission to Russia ===
Appointed by the Royal Government of Cambodia as Professor of Khmer at the Institute of International Relations in Moscow in 1965, he continued his linguistic studies in the Soviet Union where he graduated from the Institute of Oriental Studies of the Russian Academy of Sciences in 1971. He was appointed assistant, then successor to the scholar-grammarian, Yuri A. Gorgoniev. He helped the latter to publish a Khmer-Russian dictionary in Moscow in 1975. His thesis written in Russian was on Essay on the lexicology of the Khmer language published in Moscow in 1976.

=== Finding refuge in France during the Khmer Rouge terror ===
As the Khmer Rouge entirely took over Cambodia after the fall of Phnom Penh, Long Seam found refuge in France and enrolled at the Sorbonne in 1976 under the supervision of Professor Jean Delvert for the preparation of a state doctoral dissertation on the Ancient Khmer vocabulary from the 6th to the 14th century through the study of Khmer inscriptions.

His wife, Khleang Saothan, whom he had married in 1955 and their daughter, Long Sokonthea, both disappeared under the Khmer Rouge regime.

He obtained his doctorate from the Sorbonne in 1980.

=== Restoring Khmer history after Year Zero ===
After a long absence from Cambodia, Long Seam was able to return there for the first time in 1982 with a Russian delegation on an assessment mission.

He continued to travel frequently to Russia as the countries kept close ties within the Eastern Bloc. In 1987, he published with Russian linguist Professor Plam, a Russian-Khmer Summary Dictionary. Having become a Soviet citizen, he was appointed Scientific Collaborator at the Institute of Oriental Studies of the Academy of Sciences. He remarried with Klara, head doctor in a hospital in Moscow who died in 2004.

In the aftermath of the Paris Peace Agreement in January 1993, he returned to settle permanently in Cambodia to recast epigraphic studies there thanks to the TOKTEN (Transfer of Knowledge Through Expatriate Nationals) program of the United Nations. In 1994, he became an expert advisor to the Royal Government of Cambodia, which enabled him to found a National Language Institute. He taught the language and epigraphy of Old Khmer at the Faculty of Archeology of the Royal University of Phnom Penh where he was able to train a good number of students who followed his passion and became readers or assistants of Khmer epigraphic studies. He was later appointed member of the Royal Academy of Cambodia in 2001 and vice-president of this Academy with the rank of Secretary of State in 2006.

Long Seam died in Phnom Penh on July 15, 2007, leaving his third wife Vanna as a widow.

== Legacy ==
=== Cambodian connection with Russia ===
Though diplomatic ties between Cambodia and Russia have existed since Nicholas II, Long Seam was particularly instrumental in fostering this relationship since the 1960s, at the time of the creation of the Khmer-Soviet Friendship Hospital and the printing of a standard Khmer-Russian grammar dictionary by the linguist Y.A. Gorgoniev.

Long Seam also taught Khmer to the Russian movie director Sergey Kolosov who moved to Phnom Penh in 1982.

=== Cambodian history from the original source ===
After the Khmer Rouge almost entirely destroy any sense of history after Year Zero, Long Seam was instrumental in restoring a certain "roman national" through his summary of Khmer history published in 1982 which still serves as a fundamental ratio for the current history programs of the Cambodian Ministry of Education. According to Iv Chan of the Cambodian Royal Academy, "most scholarship on Cambodia’s past, particularly by the French, had focused on documents, but it was Long Seam who really first began pulling history directly from the ancient inscriptions."

=== Cambodian dictionary of Ancient Khmer ===
In 2000, Long Seam published a dictionary of Ancient Khmer based on Khmer inscriptions of from the 6th to the 8th century. He also studied problems of Khmer lexicology and directed various thesis projects which contributed to the enriching the field of Khmer epigraphy as well as toponymy. His works published in the Khmer language have contributed to revive local scholarship in Cambodia.

== Bibliography ==
Long Seam left many publications in Khmer, Russian, French and English. His masterpiece is his Dictionary of Old Khmer according to the inscriptions of Cambodia from the 6th to the 14th century with some 650 pages published in Phnom Penh in 2000, after working on it for more than twenty years. His premature death prevented the publication of other volumes of the Old Khmer dictionary which remained in manuscript form in his personal library, and his work is currently being continued by Khmer professor Meakh Bora. His works are kept at the library of the Centre for Khmer Studies in Siem Reap.

== Links ==
- Bernon, Olivier de (2007). "In memoriam Long Seam (1935-2007)". Aséanie, Sciences humaines en Asie du Sud-Est. 19 (1): 9–11.
