= Matcha Cafe Maiko =

Hawaiian chain of matcha cafes

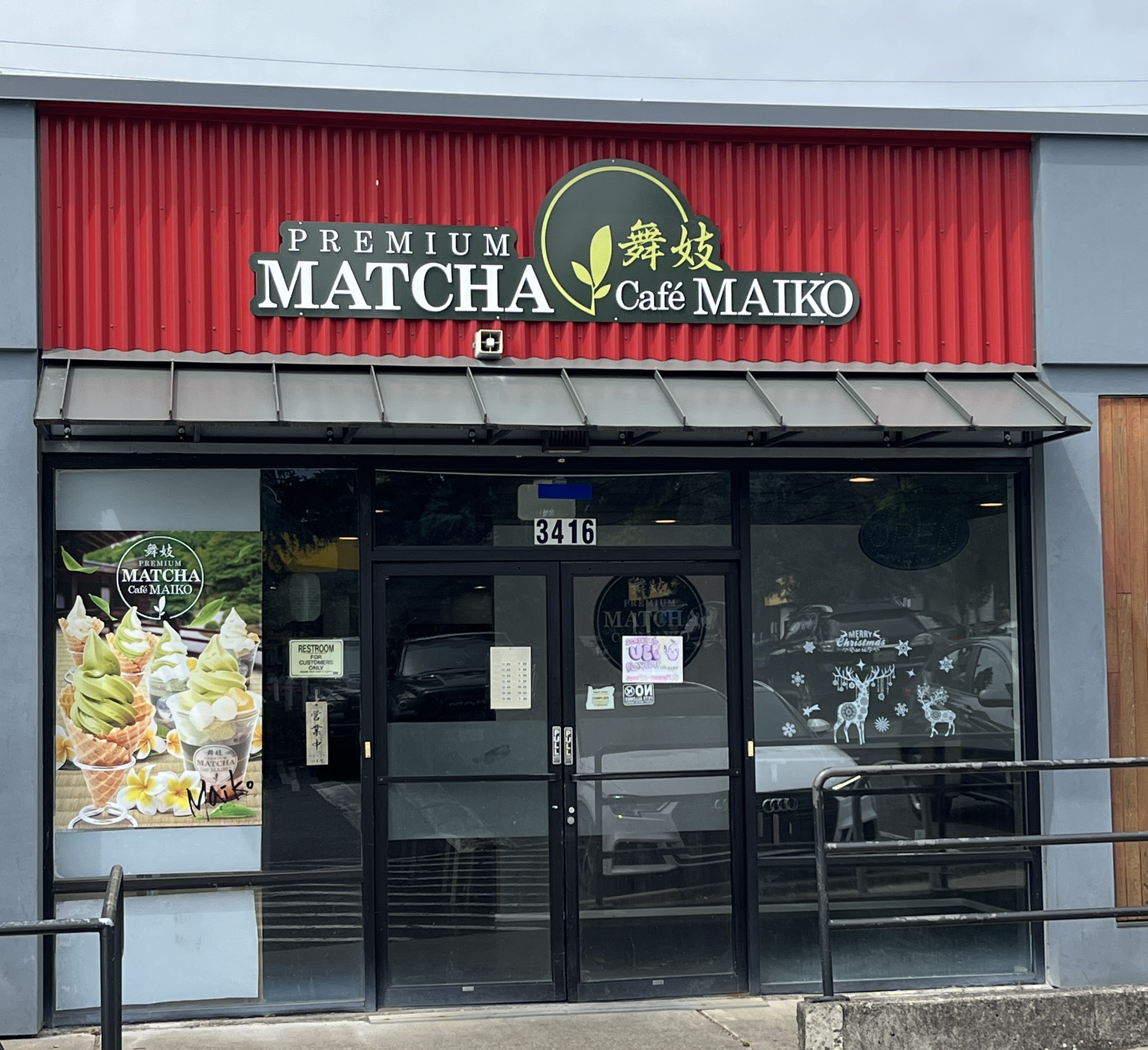
- Exterior of a location in Portland, Oregon, 2025
- Founded: 2016; 10 years ago in Honolulu, Hawaii, U.S.
- Website: matchacafe-maiko.com

Matcha Cafe Maiko (also known as Premium Matcha Cafe Maiko) is a chain of cafes that serve matcha, based in Hawaii. The business was established in Honolulu in 2016. There are locations in the United States, Canada, and Macau.

== Description ==
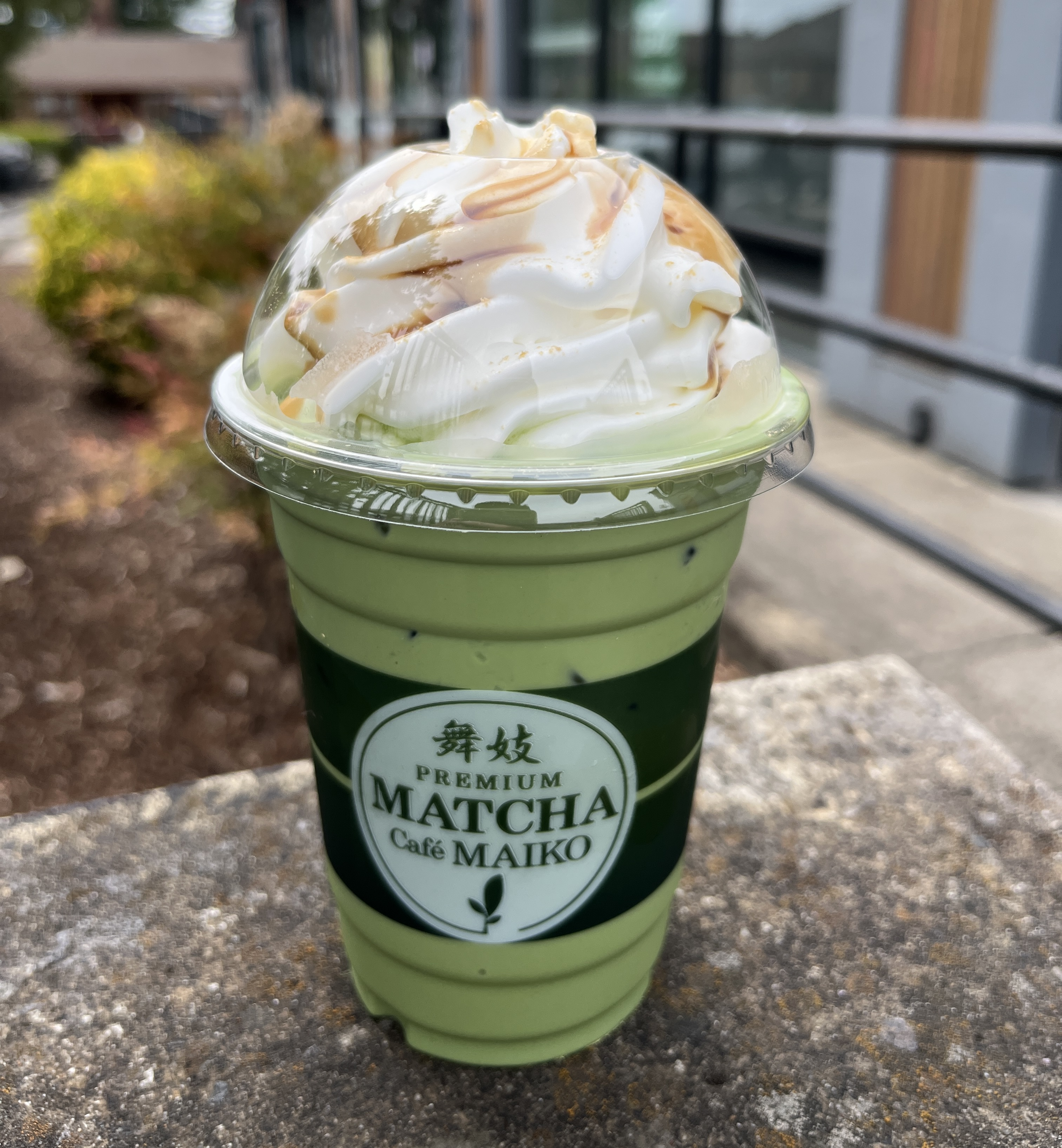
Iced drink

The menu includes matcha soft serve, shaved ice, and a parfait with candied chestnuts and matcha chiffon cake. Ice cream can be served with waffle cones. Drink options include an iced matcha latte and a hojicha frappé.

== History and locations ==
The first Canadian location opened in Richmond. Matcha Cafe Maiko has been a vendor at the Vancouver Ice Cream Festival.

=== United States ===
The chain operated 21 locations in 14 U.S. states, as of 2024. As of 2026, the amount has increased to 25 stores in 15 states.

In California, there is a location in San Diego. The location in San Francisco is the only Matcha Cafe Maiko in the Bay Area.

In New York City, there is a location in Chinatown.

Matcha Cafe Maiko also operates in Las Vegas, Nevada.

In Portland, Oregon, a cafe operates at the intersection of Cesar Chavez and Powell Boulevard in southeast Portland's Richmond neighborhood.

In Texas, the Houston location is the city's first cafe dedicated to matcha. There is also a location in San Antonio.

== Reception ==
Brianna Ruback included Matcha Cafe Maiko in Eat This, Not That's 2024 list of ten chains that serves the best matcha.
