= Bo Songvisava =

Thai chef and restaurateur

Duangporn "Bo" Songvisava (Thai: ดวงพร "โบ" ทรงวิศวะ; born 1979 or 1980) is a Thai chef and restaurateur. She and her husband, chef Dylan Jones, own and operated Bo.lan, a restaurant in Bangkok's Thong Lo neighborhood. In 2018 Songvisava was profiled on the fifth season of the documentary series Chef's Table.

== Early life and education ==
Duangporn Songvisava, nicknamed "Bo", was born in Bangkok, Thailand, in 1979 or 1980 to a Thai mother and a Taiwanese father. She has four siblings. Her parents owned and operated a canning business. Growing up, she helped them cook Thai-Chinese food at home; they were her inspiration to become a chef. Her family also ate Western food, but Thai was her favorite.

Songvisava wanted to go to culinary school, but her parents urged her to go to college and earn a traditional degree. She studied English and French for two years until it became unbearable. Thailand at the time had no culinary degree offerings, so she transferred to Griffith University's Hotel Management School and took a business degree in Restaurant and Catering Management. Unable to find a hotel job after graduating, she returned to Australia to study at the University of Adelaide and Le Cordon Bleu, and graduated with a master's in Gastronomy.

== Career ==
Songvisava's first professional position was at Amanda Gale's Cy'an, a Mediterranean restaurant in Bangkok, as a commis 3. While there, she was asked about Thai food by a visiting foreign chef and realized she knew very little about Thai food. When she asked other local chefs, she discovered very few knew much about traditional Thai food. Thailand at the time had few restaurants that cooked traditional Thai, as most catered to the palate of tourists. In 2005 she took a position as a chef de partie in London with David Thompson's Nahm, then seen as one of the world's best Thai restaurants and one of the few with a Michelin star. She met her husband, then working as a sous chef there, and in 2008 the couple moved to Thailand.

In 2008, Songvisava and Jones opened Bo.lan in what was previously a bungalow-style home in Bangkok's Thong Lo neighborhood. It followed a slow food concept and served traditional Thai food. The New York Times called it "perhaps Bangkok's first chic Thai restaurant." The Daily Telegraph called the food "sophisticated but unpretentious." Songvisava received most of her inspiration from reading old cookbooks and from talking with farmers. The restaurant name was a portmanteau of her and her husband's first names, chosen because it sounds like the Thai word for "classic". The restaurant used solar panels and had its own vegetable garden and water filtration system and recycles waste. It sourced from local farmers and artisans, and the wine list includes emerging Thai wineries. It resisted demanding organic certification because the bureaucratic paperwork might drive away farms, so Songvisava says, "I visit the farms and if I trust that they're doing organic, I buy from them." After operating for 13 years, the restaurant closed in 2021 amidst the COVID-19 pandemic. Songvisava cited pressures from coronavirus measures such as semi-lockdowns, reduced seating capacity, and the ban on alcohol sales. In March 2022, Bo.lan reopened for so-called "ad hoc dining", held multiple times each month. The restaurant fully reopened in December 2023.

Songvisava taught food & beverage management and Thai cooking at two Thai universities and hosted a PBS show called Kin Yu Kue (Eat Live Be) covering food issues.

In 2014 the couple hosted a pop-up in New York's Greenwich Village.

In 2015, the couple opened Err, which translates to "yeah" in Thai, a casual dining restaurant serving street food. Dishes are shared family style. The New York Times called it "rustic drinking food with a focus on quality ingredients."

In 2016 they hosted a pop-up in Hong Kong.

In 2018 Songvisava was profiled on the fifth season of the documentary series Chef's Table. That same year she was profiled on Swedish documentary series Four Hands Menu.

In 2019 Jones and Songvisava judged the finals of Hyatt's Good Taste Series.

== Awards and recognition ==
Bo.lan has a Michelin star, awarded the first year Michelin put out a guide to Thailand. CNN credited Jones and Songvisava, along with their mentor David Thompson, with "forcibly (and sometimes tactlessly) reacquainting Thai diners with their own culinary heritage."

In 2013 Songvisava was named Asia's best female chef by 50 Best Restaurants in Asia, the inauguration of the award, and Bo.lan was number 36 on the 50 Best Restaurants in Asia list.

In 2017 it was named to the Culinary Institute of America's Plant-forward Global 50 list and was 19th on Asia's 50 Best Restaurants.

In 2018 Bo.lan was named number 37 on Asia's 50 Best Restaurants.

In 2019 Bo.lan was named one of the 18 best restaurants in the world by World Restaurant Awards and was 19th on S. Pellegrino & Acqua Panna Asia's 50 Best Restaurants.

== Personal life ==
Songvisava is married to Australian-born Dylan Jones. The two met while working at London's Nahm and married in 2012. The couple have two sons.

== See also ==
- List of Michelin starred restaurants in Thailand
