= Som saa =

London restaurant

Coordinates: 51.5173°N 0.0738°W

Som saa is a Thai restaurant in Shoreditch, London. The restaurant was founded in 2016 by Andy Oliver, Mark Dobbie and Tom George.

== History ==
Andy Oliver and Mark Dobbie first met in London in 2009 working at Nahm under David Thompson. Oliver, Dobbie and co-founder Tom George opened som saa as a year-long pop-up in London Fields in 2014. This was followed by a crowdfunding campaign, which allowed them to open the permanent restaurant in Spitalfields in 2016.

In May 2025, the restaurant was forced to close after a kitchen fire. It reopened in November 2025.

== Reception ==
The restaurant has received good reviews from food critics.

Som saa won Best Restaurant at the London Restaurant Festival in 2016 and 4th Best Restaurant in the National Restaurant Awards 2017.
