= Vinod Sahadevan Nair =

Vinod Sahadevan Nair is an Indian farmer from Parassala, Kerala. Nair is known as Vazha Chettan, or Banana Brother, for his extensive collection of over 500 Indian banana varieties.

Nair was raised in Kerala, and has been a farmer since age 12. He studied physics at university, and later worked as a web designer in Kochi, returning to his family village in Parassala to help farm on weekends.

In 2012, Nair attempted to acquire native banana suckers from an agricultural institute in Kerala, but was turned away. He subsequently became a collector of banana genetics from across India. Following his mother's death in late 2015, he moved home to Parassala to care for his father and become a full time farmer.

Nair's farm has become a living repository of Indian banana genetics.

Nair and his farm were featured in the Banana episode of the 2024 TV series Omnivore.
