= Nathan Thornburgh =

American television producer

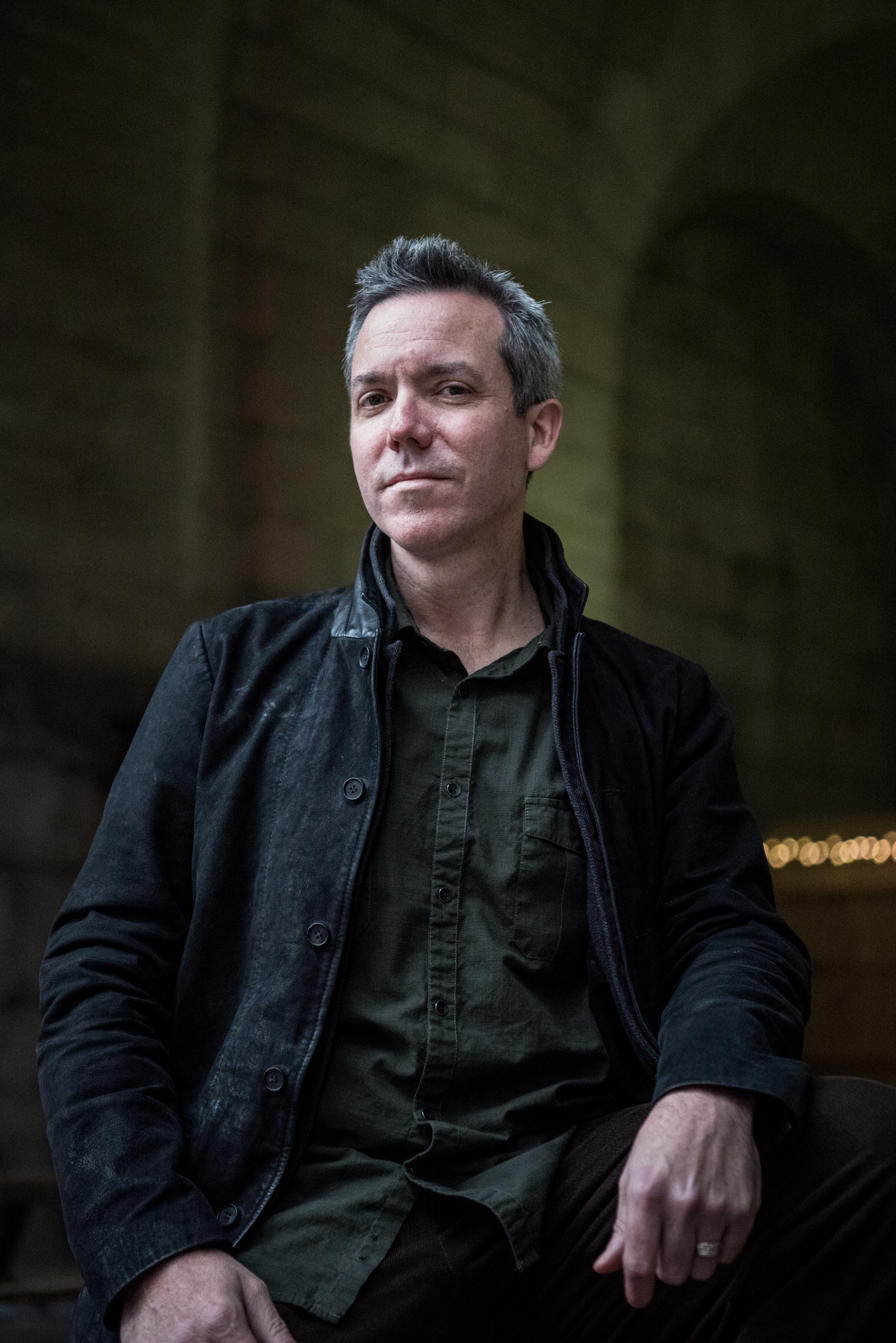
- Born: Nathan Thornburgh; 1975 (age 50–51); San Francisco, California, U.S.
- Education: Stanford University
- Occupations: Journalist and podcast host
- Years active: 1999–present
- Spouse: Julia Iwamasa
- Children: 2

Nathan Thornburgh is an American journalist, former TIME Magazine foreign correspondent editor, and CEO of Roads & Kingdoms, which he co-founded with food writer Matt Goulding and at which Anthony Bourdain was a partner from 2015 until his death. Thornburgh also hosts the Roads & Kingdoms-produced podcast The Trip.

== Early life ==
Thornburgh grew up in Key West, Florida and moved to San Francisco for high school. He graduated from Stanford University in 1998 with a B.A. in comparative literature.

== Career ==
=== TIME ===
Thornburgh began in journalism as a stringer in Seattle for Time Magazine and a freelance writer for Seattle alt-weekly newspaper The Stranger. During this period, he played music professionally in Seattle and Havana, Cuba. In 2003, he moved to Boston and then New York to work as a domestic and foreign correspondent for TIME, staying at the magazine in various capacities until 2011. He served as Nation Editor, working on TIME’s U.S. political coverage in coordination with Jay Carney, then head of the Washington DC Bureau. He wrote numerous cover stories at TIME including The Class of 9/11, Dropout Nation, the Case for Amnesty. He was a writer on the 2007 TIME Person of the Year package on Vladimir Putin and later served as editor of the Briefing and 10 Questions sections of the magazine.

=== Roads & Kingdoms ===
Thornburgh met former chef and Men’s Health food editor Matt Goulding in 2009 in Mexico City, where they first came up with the idea for Roads & Kingdoms, a publication dedicated to in-depth travel, food, and politics reporting. They started Roads & Kingdoms first as a Tumblr in 2011, launching the full site in March 2012 with their third co-founder, designer Doug Hughmanick.

In 2015, Anthony Bourdain joined Roads & Kingdoms as the publication’s sole investor and editor-at-large after Goulding sent him what AdAge described as a drunken e-mail. Roads & Kingdoms has won numerous awards, including the 2017 James Beard Foundation Award for Publication of the Year.

Thornburgh was the editor of three books written by his Roads & Kingdoms partner Matt Goulding for HarperCollins: Rice Noodle Fish, Grape Olive Pig, and Pasta Pane Vino.

In 2017, Roads & Kingdoms and CNN partnered to create the digital venture Explore Parts Unknown, which included original stories, video, photography, and interactives from around the world.

Explore Parts Unknown won several Webbies for design and video. Thornburgh won a 2018 Primetime Emmy as executive producer of Anthony Bourdain: Explore Parts Unknown in the Outstanding Short Form Non-Fiction category, along with director Kate Kunath, Matt Goulding, and several producers from CNN.

=== The Trip ===
In 2016, Thornburgh interviewed Anthony Bourdain and their interview would take them to new lengths less than a year later. In partnership with Anthony Bourdain, Thornburgh launched the travel podcast The Trip in 2017. Hosted by Thornburgh, The Trip features interviews with exceptional people around the world, including W. Kamau Bell, Samin Nosrat, Dan the Automator, and José Andrés.

== Accolades ==
- 2019 National Magazine Award for Website, Service and Lifestyle
- 2018 Primetime Emmy for Outstanding Short Form Non-Fiction
- 2018 James Beard Foundation Award for Best Food Section
- 2017 James Beard Foundation Award for Publication of the Year
- 2017 IACP Award, Literary Food Writing for Grape, Olive, Pig
- 2016 Travel Book of the Year, Society of American Travel Writers, for Rice, Noodle, Fish
- 2013 Society of American Travel Writers Gold Award for Best Travel Journalism Site
