= Samrub Samrub Thai =

Samrub Samrub Thai สำรับสำหรับไทย
- Interactive map of Samrub Samrub Thai สำรับสำหรับไทย

Restaurant information
- Established: 2018
- Head chef: Prin Polsuk
- Pastry chef: Nuttawat Chotikasupa
- Food type: Thai
- Rating: 1 Michelin star
- Location: 39/11 Yommarat Alley, Silom, Bang Rak, Bangkok 10500, Thailand
- Coordinates: 13.7269°N 100.5374°E
- Website: samrubsamrubthai.com

Samrub Samrub Thai (Thai: สำรับสำหรับไทย; RTGS: Samrap Samrap Thai) is a restaurant in Bangkok, Thailand, focused on traditional and regional Thai cuisine. It was awarded a Michelin star in 2023.

== History ==
Owned by chef Prin Polsuk and his wife Thanyaporn "Mint" Jarukittikun (Thai: ธัญญพร "มิ้นต์" จารุกิตติกุล), Samrub Samrub Thai grew out of a post-work gathering of chefs that began in 2015. Polsuk and Jarukittikun started the restaurant in 2017, and it found a permanent location off Charoen Krung Road in 2019. It later moved to Silom and in 2024 to larger quarters in Sala Daeng.

Samrub Samrub Thai received a Michelin star in December 2023, and it was listed as number 29 on the Asia's 50 Best Restaurants 2024 list.

== Restaurant ==
Samrub Samrub Thai occupies the lower floor of a renovated 4-story building where Polsuk and Jarukittikun live. Jarukittikun designed the interior, which has black wood and brick floors; the kitchen staff's uniforms are decorated with motifs based on past menus, and the restaurant's logo, a hybrid of a dog and a pig, developed out of an image of a pineapple.

== Cuisine ==
Samrub Thai means "for Thai"; the restaurant serves Thai food, showcasing regional cuisines, lost dishes, and local ingredients. Polsuk and Jarukittikun were featured in the chili pepper episode of Omnivore, a documentary series created by René Redzepi and Matt Goulding.

== Previous menus ==
- March - April 2024: Fisherman samrub, an ode to the people of the sea [Urak Lawoi'] and the seashore (Thai: สำรับชาวทะเล)
- September - October 2024: Samui in Samrub Island (Thai: สำรับเยี่ยงสมุย)
- January - February 2025: Burapa, Roads to the East (Thai: สำรับบูรพาวิถี)
- March - February 2025: Ubonrachathani, City of Pink Lotus (Thai: สำรับอีสานรอรักเมืองบัวอุบล)
