= Eat This, Not That =

Media franchise owned by David Zinczenko

Eat This, Not That!
- First edition cover
- Author: David Zinczenko with Matt Goulding
- Cover artist: George Karabotsos
- Language: English
- Subject: Nutrition
- Publisher: Galvanized Media
- Publication place: United States
- Media type: Print (Paperback), Digital
- ISBN: 1-59486-854-9
- OCLC: 177062677
- Dewey Decimal: 613.2 22
- LC Class: RA784 .Z563 2008

Eat This, Not That! is a media franchise owned and operated by co-author David Zinczenko. It bills itself as "The leading authority on food, nutrition, and health." No independent authority has verified that claim.

The original book series was developed from a column from Men's Health magazine written by David Zinczenko and Matt Goulding. The franchise now includes a website, quarterly magazine, videos, e-books and downloadable PDFs.

Eat This, Not That! brands itself as the "No-diet weight loss solution" and provides recommendations regarding food choices with the aim of improving health. Criteria for unhealthy dishes center on its levels of calories, fat, saturated fat, trans fat, sodium, and/or sugar content. The healthier alternatives often include higher levels of fiber and/or protein.

A quarterly magazine, Eat This, Not That!, was launched in 2015 and is distributed by Meredith nationwide.

== Reviews ==
The original Eat This, Not That! was reviewed by Tara Parker-Pope of The New York Times. Well Blog writes, "The comparisons are always interesting and often surprising." However, critics did not agree with every comparison. Parker-Pope went on to write, "Chances are you won't agree with every item. For instance, in a comparison of choices for a child's Easter basket, I can't figure out why Jelly Belly Jelly Beans, with 150 calories (630 kJ), are an 'eat this' while Marshmallow Peeps, with 140 calories (590 kJ), are a 'not that.'"

Dawn Jackson Blatner, the spokeswoman for the American Dietetic Association, said in USA Today, "There are several healthful options for the restaurants. These are real changes people can make to save hundreds of calories."
