= Kin Khao =

Thai restaurant in San Francisco, California, U.S.

- Interactive map of Kin Khao

Restaurant information
- Food type: Thai
- Rating: (Michelin Guide)
- Location: 55 Cyril Magnin Street, San Francisco, California, 94102, United States
- Coordinates: 37°47′7″N 122°24′33″W

Kin Khao is a Thai restaurant in San Francisco, California. Owned by Pim Techamuanvivit, the restaurant has received a Michelin star.

== See also ==
- List of Michelin-starred restaurants in California
- List of Thai restaurants
