= Roads & Kingdoms =

Independent online publication

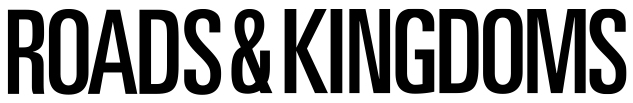
- Company type: Private
- Founded: 2012
- Headquarters: Brooklyn, New York; Barcelona, Spain
- Key people: Nathan Thornburgh (co-founder); Matt Goulding (co-founder); Doug Hughmanick (co-founder); Anthony Bourdain (sole investor)
- Website: www.roadsandkingdoms.com
- Current status: Active

Roads & Kingdoms is an independent online publication that explores culture and politics through food and travel. Founded in 2012 by veteran journalists Nathan Thornburgh and Matt Goulding, along with graphic designer Douglas Hughmanick, Roads & Kingdoms is based in Brooklyn, New York, and Barcelona, Spain. In 2017, Roads & Kingdoms won the James Beard Foundation Award for Publication of the Year. In 2019, Roads & Kingdoms won the National Magazine Award for Website, Service and Lifestyle.

Author and television host Anthony Bourdain was a partner and investor in the company from 2015 until his suicide in June 2018. His partnership with Roads & Kingdoms and CNN on the digital series Explore Parts Unknown won an Emmy in 2018.

== History ==
Initially created as a Tumblr in late 2011, Roads & Kingdoms transitioned to a self-funded website in 2012. The company is named after The Book of Roads & Kingdoms, a geographical text by Abu Abdullah Al-Bakri, an 11th-century Andalusian geographer. Roads & Kingdoms publishes articles by writers from around the world, with a focus on featuring local voices. Their content includes long-form dispatches, food-focused articles, and experiential travel guides.

In 2015, Roads & Kingdoms co-founder Matt Goulding collaborated with Bourdain's imprint at HarperCollins on Rice Noodle Fish: Deep Travels Through Japan’s Food Culture, which would go on to become the first of three similar books produced by Roads & Kingdoms, including Grape Olive Pig (2016) and Pasta Pane Vino (2018). That year, Bourdain also became a partner, investor, and editor-at-large for Roads & Kingdoms’ website.

In early 2017, the site launched The Trip, a podcast focused on travel stories and hosted by Thornburgh, with cameos from Bourdain. After Bourdain's suicide in 2018, The Trip shifted its main focus to weekly guest interviews.

Also in 2017, Roads & Kingdoms partnered with CNN to create the website and webseries for Bourdain's travel food show Anthony Bourdain: Parts Unknown, titled "Explore Parts Unknown", for which they won a Primetime Emmy Award for Outstanding Short Form Nonfiction or Reality Series in 2018. The site features travel notes, exclusive videos, and behind-the-scenes content from each destination Bourdain visited for Parts Unknown.

In 2020, Ajarn Kor Neeow, who was featured in Roads & Kingdoms The Last Days of An Ancient Sword and was dubbed "the last traditional Dha sword maker in South East Asia", made a hand forged Thai sword which was awarded to the winner of Full Metal Dojo 18 in Bangkok.

== Name ==
The title of the magazine refers to a main work of the andalusian geographer and historian AbūʿUbaid al-Bakrī (1094–1014, Arabic: أبو عبيد عبد الله بن عبد العزيز البكري). His work is characterized by a very objective description of Europe, Northern Africa, and the Arabian Peninsula. In Kitāb al-Masālik wa-l-Mamālik (1068; book of Roads and Kingdoms) al-Bakri writes about the people and their habits, as well about geography, climate and the capitals of the territories connected to the Mediterranean Sea.

== Awards ==
- 2019 National Magazine Award for Website, Service and Lifestyle
- 2018 Primetime Emmy for Outstanding Short Form Non-Fiction, Explore Parts Unknown
- 2018 James Beard Foundation Award for Food Journalism Source
- 2017 James Beard Foundation Award for Publication of the Year
- 2017 Webby Award Source
- Winner of the 2017 IACP Award: Literary or Historical Food Writing, Grape, Olive, Pig
- Gourmand World Cookbook Award Winner: Culinary Travel, Grape, Olive, Pig
- Amazon Best Book of November 2016: Cookbooks, Food and Wine, Grape, Olive, Pig
- 2016 Travel Book of the Year by the Society of American Travel Writers, Rice, Noodle, Fish
- Finalist for the 2016 IACP Awards: Literary Food Writing, Rice, Noodle, Fish
- Named one of the Financial Times' "Best Books of 2016", Rice, Noodle, Fish
- 2013 Society of American Travel Writers SATW - Gold Award for Best Travel Journalism Site
