= Jayakrishnan Thaazhathuveettil =

Jayakrishnan Thaazhathuveettil (Note: other spellings include Thazhathuveetil) is an Indian electrician and farmer from Kerala, known for his approach to organic paddy farming and collection of 118 Indian rice varieties. Thaazhathuveettil grows a variety of heirloom rice varieties, including Kuruva and Kalabati.

== Career ==
Thaazhathuveettil and friend Leneesh K cultivates rice on 1.5 acres in Necholi, and 13 acres in Kaatikkulam, Wayanad. In 2020, they opened the Folk Rice Centre & Knowledge Centre.

Thaazhathuveettil was featured in the rice episode of the 2024 TV series Omnivore.
