= Prin Polsuk =

- ปริญญ์ ผลสุข
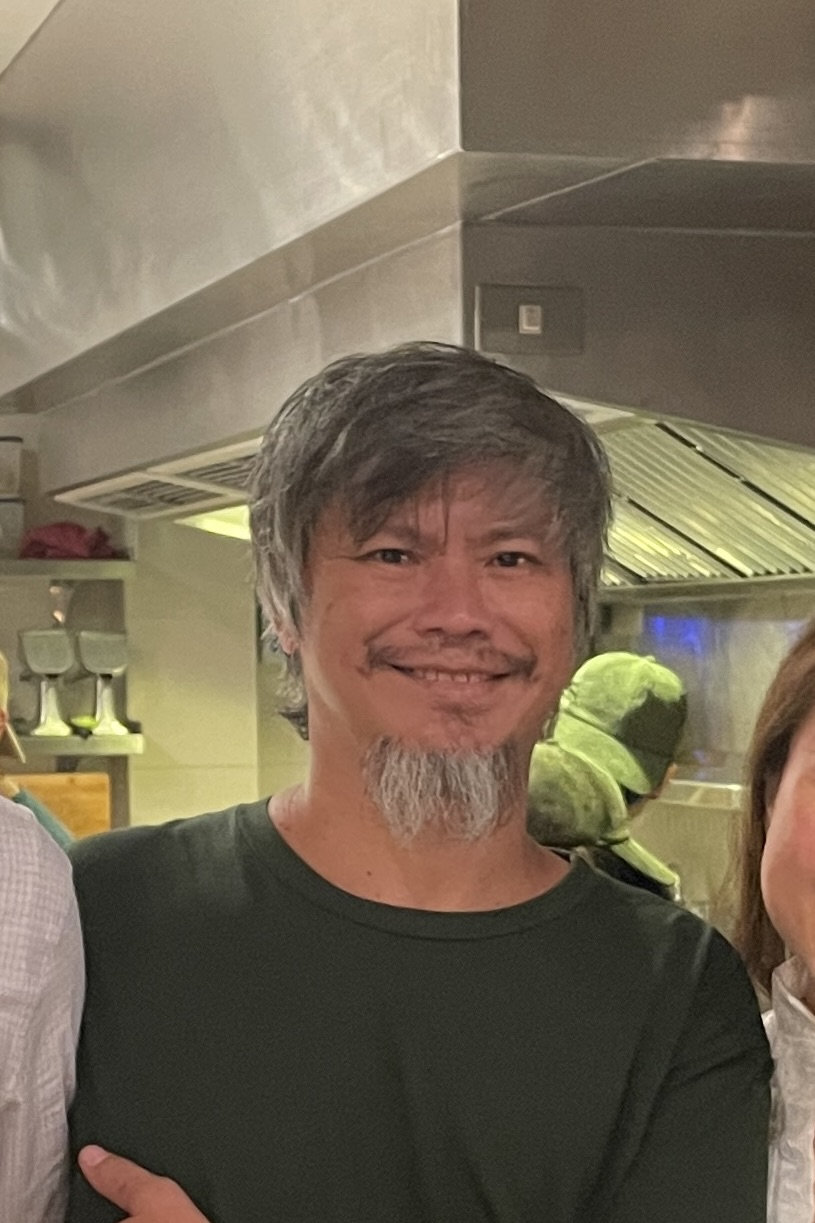
- Born: Lampang Province, Thailand
- Spouse: Thanyaporn "Mint" Jarukittikun
- Children: 1

Prin Polsuk (Thai: ปริญญ์ ผลสุข; RTGS: Prin Phonsuk) is a Thai chef and restaurateur, the co-owner of Samrub Samrub Thai (Thai: สำรับสำหรับไทย), a private kitchen restaurant in Bangkok.

== Career ==
Polsuk began his culinary career at the Mandarin Oriental Bangkok's Sala Rim Naam restaurant. He later became a protegé of David Thompson, working at Nahm London until its closure in 2010, and Polsuk returned to Bangkok as head chef of Nahm Bangkok until 2018.

== Restaurants ==
- Samrub Samrub Thai (opened 2017)
- Vilas (opened 2022)
- Kao Soy Prin (opened 2025)
- Noi Samrub Bar (opened 2025)
