= Kimsan Pol =

Pol Kimsan (Khmer: ប៉ុល គឹមសាន; born 1984 in Kampot Province, Cambodia), also known professionally as Kimsan Pol, is a Cambodian chef and restaurateur.

She is the Executive Chef and Partner of the Restaurant Collection Siem Reap, overseeing multiple establishments across Siem Reap and Phnom Penh. She serves as President of the Cambodia Chefs Association for the term 2024 to 2027. She is widely credited with pioneering Khmer fine dining in Cambodia.

== Early life ==
Chef Pol Kimsan was born in 1984 in Kampot Province, Cambodia. She first started cooking at the age of ten and came from a long line of village cooks. She has cited her mother as her primary culinary inspiration: "I knew I wanted to be a cook from my mom. Both our moms were village cooks, this is an important position in Cambodia. They are often asked by the whole village for weddings or ceremonies."

== Education ==
Chef Pol Kimsan moved from Kampot to Siem Reap in 2002 and studied at the École d'Hôtellerie et de Tourisme Paul Dubrule in Siem Reap for nine months. She has described the circumstances of that decision: "I'm from Kampot in the countryside and when I finished high school, I didn't know what to do [...] I came to Siem Reap because people said there are lots of tourists. So my uncle brought me here and sent me to Paul Dubrule school where I studied kitchen."

As a member of the first cohort of the École Paul Dubrule, Pol Kimsan became a source of inspiration for subsequent students of the institution, regularly returning to the school to meet students and support their events.

== Career ==
=== Early career ===
Following her training, Pol Kimsan began working at the French bistro at Angkor Victoria Hotel in Siem Reap. She honed her skills as a Chef de Partie before ascending to the position of Culinary Director at the Restaurant Collection in Siem Reap.

=== International training ===
Her career took her across several continents and through various competitive events. She trained under Michelin-starred French Chef Régis Marcon. She also trained under Michelin-starred Chef Thierry Marais at the Ritz-Carlton in Tokyo, Japan.

=== Embassy Restaurant (2014 onwards) ===
Determined to revive the culinary heritage of Cambodia, which had been severely disrupted under the Khmer Rouge regime, Chef Pol Kimsan conducted research in the national archives to recover forgotten recipes and received training from a former member of King Norodom Sihanouk's cooking staff.

In 2014, she became Executive Chef of the newly opened restaurant Embassy on King's Road in Siem Reap, staffed entirely by women. She described the project's intent: "Before opening Embassy, we did some research at the national archives because lots of knowledge disappeared during the Khmer Rouge regime, including our Cambodian gastronomy. Thanks to the archives, we had access to forgotten recipes. We also got the chance to be coached by a member of the cooking staff of the former King of Cambodia, King Sihanouk."

She has stated: "I am very proud of having opened the Embassy, the first Khmer gastronomic restaurant in Cambodia, with an excellent team of women."

In 2015, she served as a guest judge on the Cambodian Television Network's "Cambodian Best Chef Phnom Penh" contest.

In 2020, Embassy was included in the Asia's 50 Best Restaurants newly created 50 Best Discovery list. The restaurant was also featured by the Secret Tables programme.

=== Sombok Restaurant (2021 onwards) ===
In 2021, Pol Kimsan extended her work to Phnom Penh with the opening of Sombok Restaurant, a Khmer fine dining establishment. The name Sombok means "nest" in Khmer, and the restaurant is operated entirely by a female team. Its interior was designed by Cambodian architect Kimseng Ouk and features an original installation by sculptor Sothea Thang.

=== World Economic Forum (2022) ===
In 2022, Pol Kimsan catered for the first-ever Cambodia Night at the World Economic Forum in Davos, Switzerland, preparing Khmer gastronomy for the Prime Minister of Cambodia and other international leaders attending the event.

=== International media coverage ===
In December 2024, she was the subject of a profile broadcast on TV5 Monde, the French-language international television network, under the title Cambodge: Kimsan Pol, cheffe khmère.

In October 2025, she appeared in an episode of the ARTE series Voyage en Cuisine, focused on the Cambodian dish num banh chok.

In December 2025, she was featured in an episode of NHK World's documentary series titled "Searching for Cambodia's Lost Cuisine."

=== Cambodia Chefs Association (2024 onwards) ===
Pol Kimsan was elected President of the Cambodia Chefs Association for the term 2024 to 2027. In that role, she promotes culinary excellence and represents Cambodia in national and international culinary competitions and forums.

She organized the Siem Reap Wok 2024 cooking competition in partnership with the Department of Commerce of Siem Reap, aimed at elevating culinary standards and promoting locally grown produce. She described the event's wider purpose: "As a professional chef, we cannot stay in one place; we need competition to push our skills to another level and move our career forward."

In June 2025, under her leadership, the Cambodia Chefs Association competed in an international culinary competition in Thailand, where Cambodian chefs won six gold medals and fifteen additional medals.

She also served as a Cambodian delegate and panelist at a UNESCO on-site workshop on integrating Intangible Cultural Heritage and Creative Cities in ASEAN waterside cities, linked to the UNESCO Creative Cities of Gastronomy programme.

=== Culinary diplomacy ===
In June 2024, Pol Kimsan represented Cambodia at the "Khmer Konnection" culinary event held in Bangalore, India, organized by the Honorary Consulate of Cambodia in collaboration with Khmer Kitchen restaurant. The event was attended by diplomatic representatives from Australia, Italy, France, Israel, Rwanda, and Cambodia. She was subsequently profiled by The Hindu newspaper following the event.

== Culinary philosophy ==
Pol Kimsan's approach centers on the revival and modernization of Cambodian culinary heritage. She has stated: "When they try our food, we want our customers to taste the genuine Cambodian flavors. We try to be modern in our way of cooking, while introducing guests to the traditional and historical dishes of Cambodia."

At Embassy, the tasting menu changes monthly and is built around seasonal, locally sourced ingredients drawn from the different provinces of Cambodia. Pol Kimsan leads kitchen teams composed entirely of women, reflecting her commitment to women's empowerment in a profession historically dominated by men.

She has described gastronomy as a vehicle for cultural promotion: "When people want to travel and discover a new culture, gastronomy plays a big part of it. Street food has a role, but our gastronomy really offers a unique experience. We try to offer food that people can't find anywhere else."

The BBC noted in 2024 that her work forms part of a broader effort to recover Cambodian culinary knowledge lost during the Khmer Rouge period.

== Recognition ==
- 2020: Embassy Restaurant included in the Asia's 50 Best Restaurants 50 Best Discovery list.
- 2022: Represented Cambodia at the World Economic Forum in Davos.
- 2022: Named one of ABC's "Exceptional" individuals, a campaign celebrating Cambodians who have defined their own version of success.
- 2024: Featured in The Hindu following her participation in the Khmer Konnection culinary diplomacy event in Bangalore.
- 2024: Elected President of the Cambodia Chefs Association, 2024 to 2027.
- 2024: Subject of a profile broadcast on TV5 Monde.
- 2025: Featured in NHK World documentary "Searching for Cambodia's Lost Cuisine."
