= Donja Lokošnica =

- Village
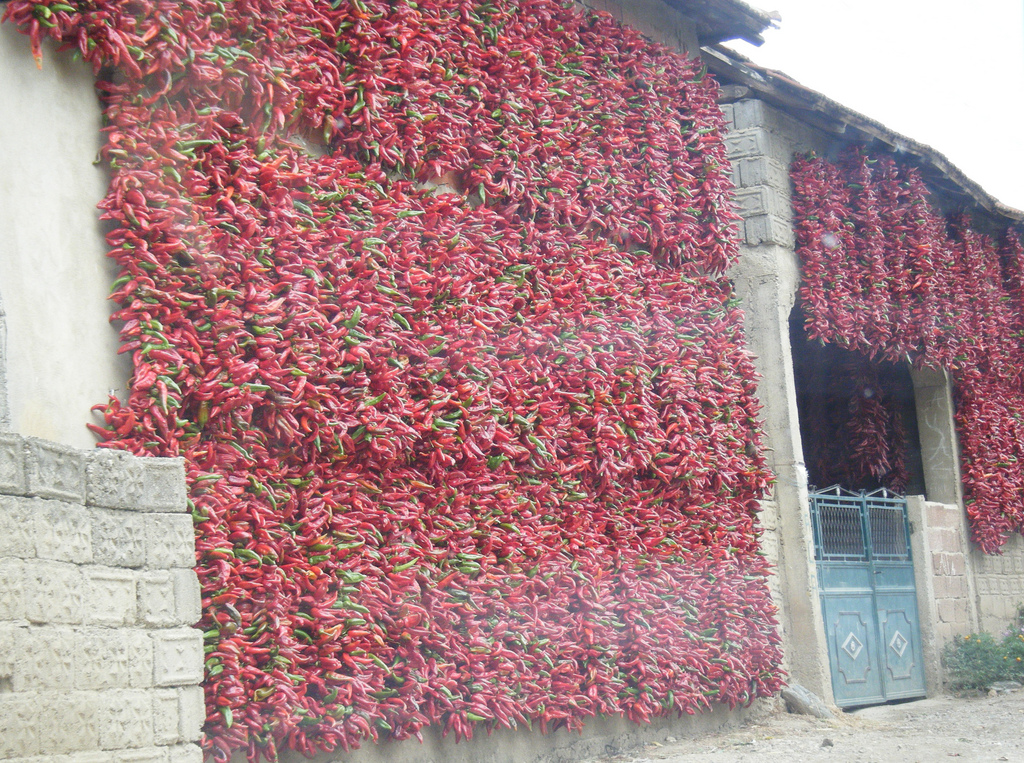
- Traditional sun-dried peppers and tomatoes the village is known for

- Location within Serbia
- Coordinates: 43°05′48″N 21°58′47″E
- Country: Serbia
- District: Jablanica District
- Municipality: Leskovac

Population (2002)
  - Total: 1,060
- Time zone: UTC+1 (CET)
  - Summer (DST): UTC+2 (CEST)

Donja Lokošnica is a village in the municipality of Leskovac, Serbia. According to the 2002 census, the village has a population of 1060 people.
