= David Zinczenko =

American publisher, author, and businessman (born 1969)

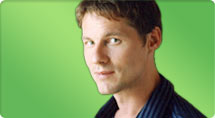
- Zinczenko
- Born: Bethlehem, Pennsylvania, U.S.
- Occupations: Author; publisher; businessman
- Title: Founder and CEO

David Zinczenko is an American publisher, author, and businessman. Previously, he was the executive vice president and general manager of Men's Health, Women's Health, Prevention and Rodale Books, the editorial director of Men's Fitness and the nutrition and wellness editor at ABC News.

== Early life and education ==
Zinczenko grew up in Bethlehem, Pennsylvania, where he attended Liberty High School. He attended Moravian College in Bethlehem, where he was editor-in-chief of the Moravian College student newspaper, The Comenian. He later served in the U.S. Navy Reserve.

== Career ==
In 2000, Zinczenko was named editor-in-chief of Men's Health by the magazine's publisher, Rodale, Inc. in Emmaus, Pennsylvania.

On December 14, 2010, Min credited Zinczenko for the "#1 Most Notable Launch of the Past 25 Years". Zinczenko oversaw the launches of both Women's Health and the affluent men's lifestyle publication Best Life, as editorial director of the two brands.

In 2009, Advertising Age Atiya deemed Women's Health the "Magazine of the Year".

In 2011, he was named editorial director of both Organic Gardening and Prevention. He left Rodale at the end of 2012.

In 2013, he was hired by American Media's CEO David Pecker to re-launch Men's Fitness and to create brand extensions for the men’s lifestyle publication while also turning Shape into an active lifestyle publication and helping to oversee Muscle & Fitness.

In 2013, Zinczenko was named the nutrition and wellness editor at ABC News. Later that year, Zinczenko launched Galvanized Media. Galvanized owns and operates Eat This, Not That!, Best Life and Zero Belly. Its imprint, Galvanized Books, distributed by Simon & Schuster, produced The 7-Day Flat-Belly Tea Cleanse by Kelly Choi, and Simon & Schuster distributed The 14-Day No Sugar Diet. Galvanized's Branded Content arm is called Galvanized Strategies.

In 2018, Zinczenko returned to Men's Health as interim editorial director.
