= Sala Baï Hotel and Restaurant School =

- Founded: 2002
- Founder: Agir Pour le Cambodge
- Headquarters: Siem Reap, Cambodia
- Services: vocational training
- Website: salabai.com/en/

Sala Baï Hotel and Restaurant School (Khmer: សាលាបណ្តុះបណ្តាលផ្នែកសណ្ឋាគារសាលាបៃ) is a vocational training school established in 2002 by the French non-governmental organization Agir Pour le Cambodge. It is one of the oldest running hospitality training schools in the country. Sala Baï Hotel and Restaurant School has partnerships with more than 30 of Cambodia's four and five star hotels.

It provides free one-year training in cooking, front office, restaurant service, housekeeping and beauty treatment to 150 young (17–23 year-old) Cambodians a year from underprivileged families. Sala Baï Hotel and Restaurant School prioritizes training young women, therefore approximately 70% of its students are female. During their training, all students are required to do two two-month internships at two different hotels.

By 2022 around 2,000 students had graduated from the Sala Baï Hotel and Restaurant School. 70 percent of them were employed immediately, while the rest managed to find a job within three weeks after graduating. One of the schools most prominent alumni is Kimsan Sok, former executive chef of the restaurant Embassy, who graduated Sala Baï Hotel and Restaurant School in 2003. In 2014 a training spa and beauty centre was established in the school with the support from the Chanel Foundation. In 2020, during the COVID-19 pandemic, Smart Axiata donated computers, tablets and LCD projectors to Sala Baï Hotel and Restaurant School to help it continue providing distance education to the school's students.
