= Center for Khmer Studies =

Cambodian research center

Center for Khmer Studies (CKS)
- The Center for Khmer Studies, Inc.
- មជ្ឈមណ្ឌលខេមរសិក្សា
- Formation: 1999
- Type: Education
- Headquarters: Siem Reap, Cambodia
- Location: Cambodia
- Region served: Cambodia and the Mekong region
- Website: https://khmerstudies.org/

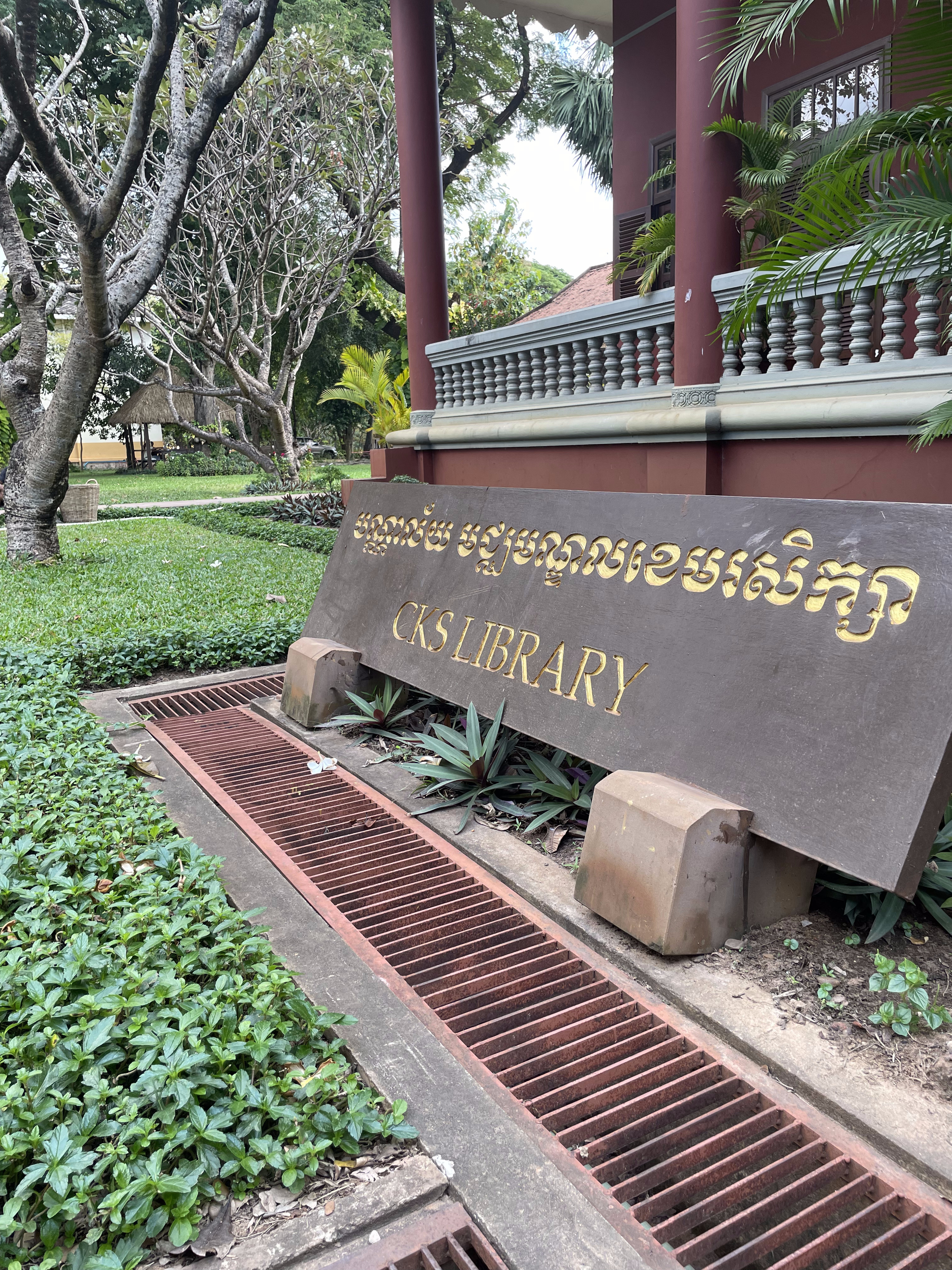
The entrance of the Center for Khmer Studies

The Center for Khmer Studies (CKS); Khmer: មជ្ឈមណ្ឌលខេមរសិក្សា) is an independent American Overseas Research Center working to promote research, teaching and public service in the social sciences, arts and humanities, as they are related to Cambodia and the Mekong region. CKS also aims to connect Cambodian scholars, students and artists with their international colleagues for the purposes of fostering understanding of Cambodia and Southeast Asia.

CKS's three core objectives are to:

• Facilitate research and international scholarly exchange through programs that increase understanding of Cambodia and its region;
• Help strengthen Cambodia's cultural and academic structures and integrate Cambodian scholars into their regional and international community;
• Promote a vigorous Cambodian civil society.

== History ==
CKS was founded in 1998 as an international non-governmental organization by a consortium of universities, organizations, scholars, and individuals. CKS recognized early on that a diversified fellowship program was essential to rebuilding the academic field in both Cambodia and the US. Through its programs, CKS has worked to bridge the gap between Cambodians and their international counterparts, while also affording opportunities for established international scholars to pursue their research. Over the past quarter century, CKS has provided doctoral and postdoctoral fellowships to hundreds of scholars from the US, France, and Cambodia. CKS has also provided undergraduate students the opportunity to become immersed in the study of Khmer history and Cambodia through its Junior Resident Fellows Program, and numerous students and scholars have benefited from CKS's in-country Khmer Language and Culture Program. The CKS Library opened in 2001, featuring rare collections, archives, and a rich array of resources on Cambodia and Southeast Asia. The Library serves the local Siem Reap community through its reading programs, Children's Library, book fairs, and other community-oriented programming.

== Programs ==
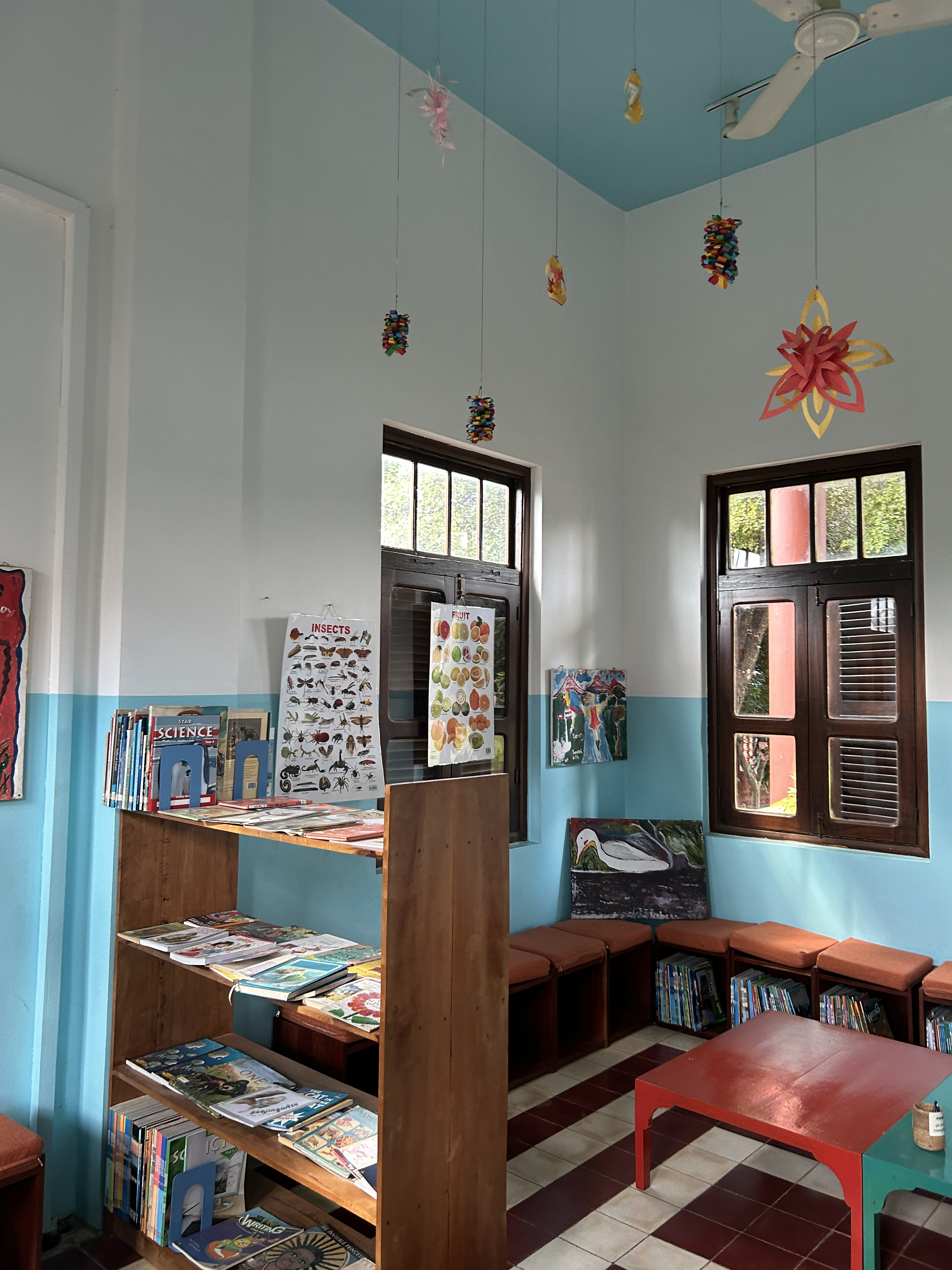
A photo representing the place in which children spend their time learning English or reading children books located in the Center for Khmer Studies.

Through its many programs, CKS seeks to expand knowledge and understanding of Cambodian history, culture, and society; foster collaboration between international and local Cambodian students, scholars, and institutions; support Cambodian higher education, and develop community education through youth and children's programs. CKS programs include Doctorate and Post-Doctorate fellowships; a summer Junior Resident Fellowship program for French, American, and Cambodian undergraduates, an eight-week Khmer Language Program; a research methodology program for Cambodian Master's students; an Overseas Faculty Development Program; an annual digital library training workshop; a Children's Library Program; publishing and translation programs; a webinar and lecture series; an annual book fair; and a variety of conferences and workshops.

== Library ==
Due to the lack of access to books and educational resources through libraries in most of Cambodia, CKS started building a library collection in 2001, specializing in Cambodian and Southeast Asian history and culture with over 20,000 volumes to date. An addition to the library was opened in January 2010 under the patronage of His Majesty King Norodom Sihamoni.

== Partnerships ==
CKS was the first Southeast Asian member of the Council of American Overseas Research Centers. CKS maintains a network of committed institutions and individuals, including universities, libraries, academic societies, and museums. Some of CKS’s numerous international partners and affiliates include: Cornell University, Paris Institute of Political Studies, New York Southeast Asia Network, University of Michigan, Sogang University, University of Hawaiʻi at Mānoa, University of Oregon, UCLA, Northern Illinois University, Royal University of Phnom Penh, Pannasastra University of Cambodia, Royal University of Fine Arts, the Tuol Sleng Genocide Museum, Bophana Audiovisual Resource Center, California State University Long Beach, Portland Community College, University of Massachusetts, Lowell, and the University of Chicago.

CKS receives its funding through government and foundation grants, including the Council of American Overseas Research Centers, the US Department of Education, the Australian Department of Foreign Affairs and Trade, the US State Department, The Asia Foundation, The Louisa Stude Sarofim Foundation, the D. M. Foundation, the Scaler Foundation, Inc., the Luce Foundation, and generous private individuals and groups.

== Governance ==
CKS is led by its board of directors:

- Jacques Hennessey, Chairman
- Eve M. Zucker, President and CEO
- Lois de Menil, Ph.D., Honorary President, and Chair Emerita
- Andrew Mertha, Vice President
- Robert Lewis, Esq., Secretary and General Counsel
- TJ Rutkowski, Treasurer
- Alan Kolata, Senior Scholar
- Darith Ea
- Sophal Ear
- Magnus Fiskesjö
- Peter Hammer
- Stephen Heder
- Franz Heng
- Ann Marie Murphy
- Try Thuon
- Oana Reedy

Trustee Emeritus

- Olivier Bernier
- Prof. Thak Chaloemtiarana, Cornell University
- The Hon. Dr. Rethy Chhem, Phnom Penh, Cambodia
- The Hon. Prof. Son Soubert, Phnom Penh, Cambodia

== Locations ==
CKS is based in Siem Reap, Cambodia, with an office in Phnom Penh and administrative and support offices in the United States.
