= Nahm =

- Interior of Nahm in Bangkok (2012)

Restaurant information
- Established: September 2010
- Head chef: Pim Techamuanvivit
- Food type: Thai cuisine
- Rating: 1 Michelin star
- Location: 27 South Sathorn Road, Bangkok, Thailand
- Website: www.comohotels.com/thailand/como-metropolitan-bangkok/nahm-bangkok

Nahm (Thai: น้ำ) is a Thai restaurant in Bangkok, Thailand. Originally opened by Australian chef David Thompson in London in 2001, Nahm became the first Thai restaurant to receive a Michelin Star in 2002.

== Overview ==
Thompson opened Nahm Bangkok in September 2010, closing the flagship London location in December 2012. In April 2018, Thompson left Nahm, and was replaced by Thai-American chef Pim Techamuanvivit.

Located in the COMO Metropolitan Bangkok in Sathorn, Nahm was awarded its first Michelin Star in the inaugural Michelin Guide Bangkok selection in 2017.

== London ==
Nahm London opened in the COMO The Halkin hotel in Belgravia, London, receiving a Michelin Star within 6 months. Thompson cited the difficulty of importing proper ingredients as a result of strict EU regulations as a reason for Nahm's closure.

== Bangkok ==
Nahm Bangkok opened in the COMO Metropolitan Hotel in 2010, and was listed as Asia's best restaurant in 2014. Prin Polsuk was head chef until 2018, and following his and Thompson's departure, Pim Techamuanvivit joined as head chef. Nahm's menu has shifted to incorporate new dishes, and more ingredients from smaller producers in Thailand.
