= David Thompson (chef) =

Australian chef

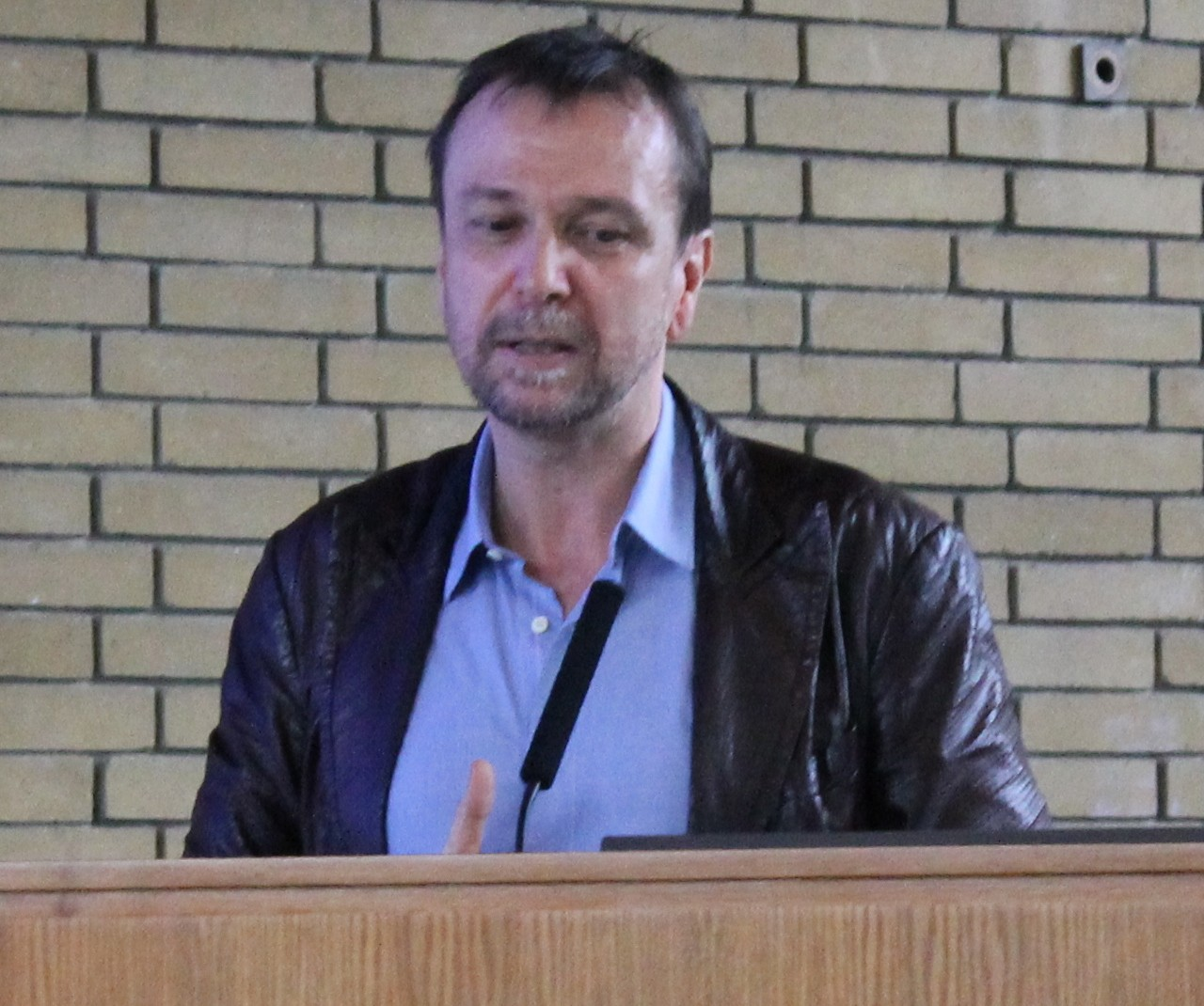
- Thompson at the Oxford Symposium on Food and Cookery in 2012
- Born: 29 March 1960 (age 66); Sydney, Australia
- Spouse: Tanongsak Yordwai (m. 2017)
- Culinary career
- Cooking style: Thai cuisine
- Current restaurants
- Aksorn, Bangkok; Chop Chop Cook Shop, Bangkok; Long Dtai, Ko Samui
- Previous restaurants
- Darley Street Thai, Sydney; Sailors Thai, Sydney; Nahm, London; Nahm, Bangkok; Long Chim, Singapore; Long Chim, Melbourne; Long Chim, Seoul; Long Chim, Sydney
- Television show
- Thai Street Food with David Thompson (2014)
- Awards
- James Beard Foundation Award (2003); International Association of Culinary Professionals Award (2003); Glenfiddich Food and Drink Awards (2003); Diners Club Lifetime Achievement Award (2016); Michelin Guide Mentor Chef Award (2025)

David Thompson (born 29 March 1960 in Sydney, Australia) is an Australian chef, restaurateur and cookery writer, known for his expertise in Thai cuisine. His restaurant Nahm, opened in London in 2001, was the first Thai restaurant to receive a Michelin star. Nahm Bangkok remained on the World's 50 Best Restaurants list for seven consecutive years. The British food writer Grace Dent wrote that Thompson "changed the face of Thai food in the UK".

== Early life and Career ==
David Thompson was born on 29 March 1960 in Sydney and grew up in the suburb of Earlwood. After completing a degree in English literature, he decided to pursue a career as a chef, initially working in French restaurant La Goule in Sydney.

After visiting Thailand in his 20s, Thompson moved there to learn the language and study the cuisine for two and a half years. During his time in Thailand, Thompson learned about traditional Thai royal cuisine from Khun Sombat Janphetchara, a former cook at the Thai royal court. She was about 90 years old when they met. His future husband, Tanongsak Yordwai, introduced them. He returned to Australia and opened Darley Street Thai in Sydney in 1992, followed by Sailors Tai in 1995. The success of these restaurants was noticed by the Singaporean hotelier Christina Ong, who asked Thompson to open a restaurant in one of her COMO hotels.

Nahm opened in 2001 in the Halkin hotel in London. Within six months, it became the first Thai restaurant to receive a Michelin star. Thompson received the "London Chef of the Year" award at the Carlton Evening Standard Food Awards in 2003. The British food writer Grace Dent wrote that Thompson "changed the face of Thai food in the UK back in the early noughties. You'll hear this repeated by chefs and food writers whenever Thompson's name is mentioned, and his work genuinely warrants genuflection ... When he opened Nahm in 2001, Thompson laughed in the face of the predictable, cosy and safe Thai food we'd been used to."

The nahm in Bangkok (2012)

In 2010, Thompson opened a second branch of Nahm in another hotel belonging to the COMO Hotels group, the Metropolitan in Bangkok. In 2012, Thompson closed Nahm London to concentrate on Nahm Bangkok. In 2014, Nahm was listed as Asia's best restaurant and remained on the World's 50 Best Restaurants list for seven consecutive years. Nahm was awarded a Michelin star in 2017 when the Michelin Guide first included restaurants in Thailand.

In 2014, Thompson founded the Aylmer Aaharn Thai food group, which came to manage operations across six countries including Thailand and Australia. Thompson was also the headline chef for the inaugural Wonder Feasts series at the first Wonderfruit festival, in Thailand.

In 2015, Thompson was interviewed on Bloomberg Television series High Flyers in Singapore. He also opened a chain of low-key Thai restaurants with Long Chim Singapore and Long Chim Perth. Branches in Sydney (2016), Melbourne (2017) and Seoul (2018) followed. The Singapore and Melbourne restaurants closed in 2019 and the Seoul restaurant in 2020.

In 2016 Thompson was recognised with the Lifetime Achievement Award at Asia's 50 Best Restaurants Awards for his dedication and commitment to Thai cuisine. In 2018, Thompson left Nahm Bangkok and opened another Thai restaurant, Aaharn, in Hong Kong.In 2020, Thompson opened Aksorn in Bangkok, serving traditional Thai dishes based on historical cookbooks. In December 2021, Aksorn received its first Michelin star in the 2022 Michelin Guide Thailand. In 2023, Thompson opened Chop Chop Cook Shop on the first floor of an art deco building on Yaowarat Road in Bangkok. In December 2024, Long Chim Sydney closed due to high rent costs.

== Personal life ==
Thompson met his Thai business partner Tanongsak Yordwai (Thai: ทนงศักดิ์ ยอดหวาย) in a dive bar in Bangkok in the late 1980s. They became a couple and married in July 2017.

== Awards ==
- 2001: Professional of the Year, Sydney Morning Herald Good Food Guide.
- 2002: Gourmand World Cookbook Award for the cookbook Thai Food.
- 2003: Outstanding London Chef, Carlton London Restaurant Awards.
- 2003: James Beard Foundation Award in the International Cooking category for the cookbook Thai Food.
- 2003: International Association of Culinary Professionals Award for the cookbook Thai Food.
- 2003: Food Book of the Year Award from the Guild of Food Writers for the cookbook Thai Food.
- 2003: Glenfiddich Food and Drink Awards in the Food Book of the Year category for the cookbook Thai Food.
- 2013: Gourmand World Cookbook Award for the cookbook Thai Street Food.
- 2013: Chef of Chefs Award from the Miele Guide.
- 2016: Diners Club Lifetime Achievement Award.
- 2025: Michelin Guide Mentor Chef Award.

== Television ==
In 2014, Thompson presented the Australian documentary series Thai Street Food with David Thompson, which explored street food and culinary traditions across Thailand. The series consisted of 13 half-hour episodes. Thompson also served as a writer and executive producer.

== Books ==
Thompson's first book, Classic Thai Cuisine, was published in 1993. His second, Thai Food, a comprehensive account of Thai cuisine, covering its history and role in society, as well as numerous recipes and menus, was released in 2002. His third book, Thai Street Food, is a collection of his favourite 100 recipes of the street.
