= List of restaurants in Boston =

The following is a list of notable restaurants in Boston, Massachusetts:

== Current ==
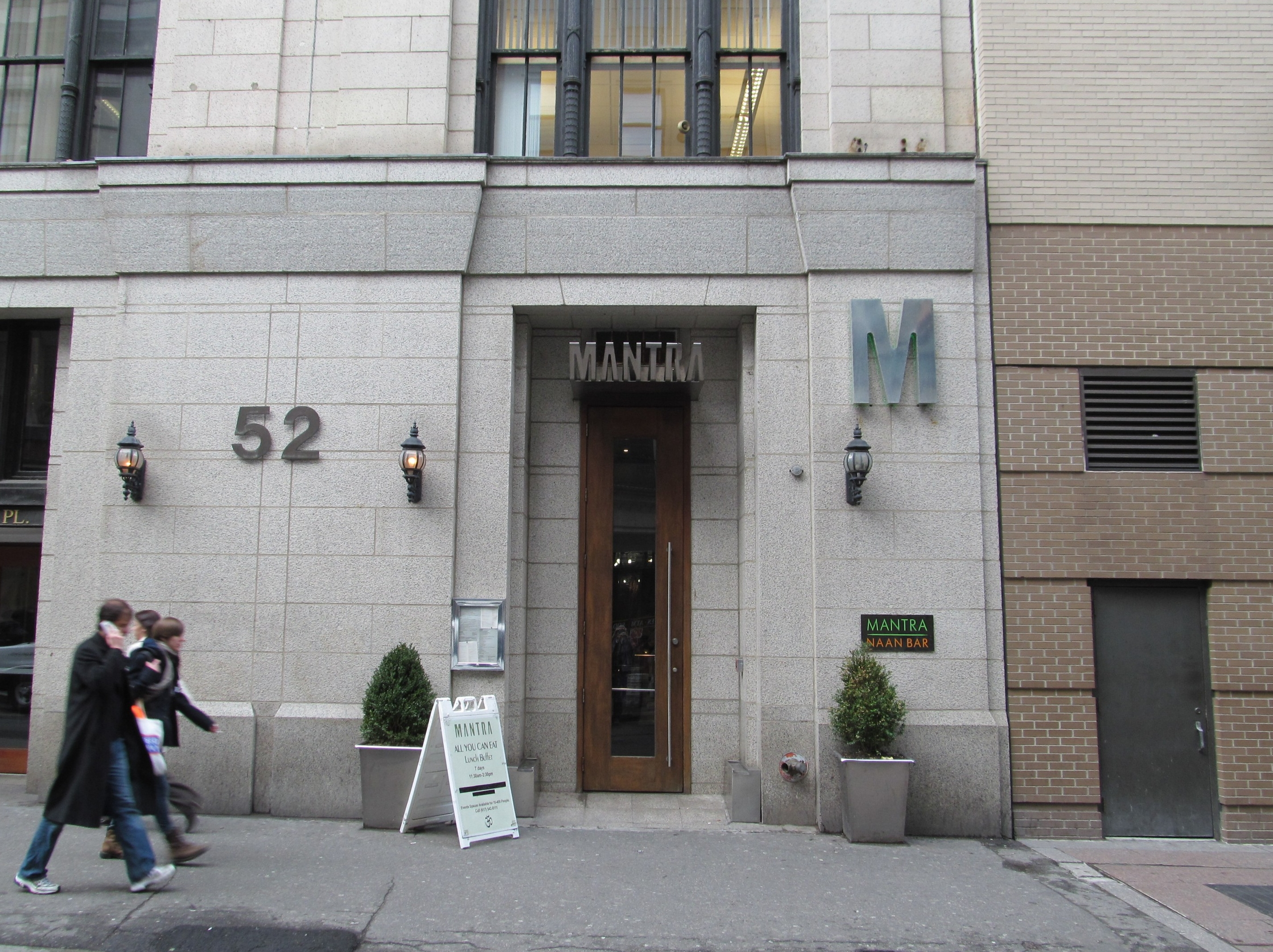
Mantra

Currently operating restaurants in Boston include:

- 311 Omakase
- Amrheins
- Anna's Taqueria
- Boca Grande Taqueria
- Bova's Bakery
- Caffé Vittoria
- Charlie's Sandwich Shoppe
- Cheers Beacon Hill
- Dig
- Elephant Walk
- The Fours
- Galleria Umberto
- Legal Sea Foods
- Mantra
- O Ya
- The Paramount, Boston
- Regina Pizzeria
- Santarpio's Pizza
- Smith & Wollensky
- Somaek
- South Street Diner
- Union Oyster House
- Upper Crust Pizzeria

== Defunct ==
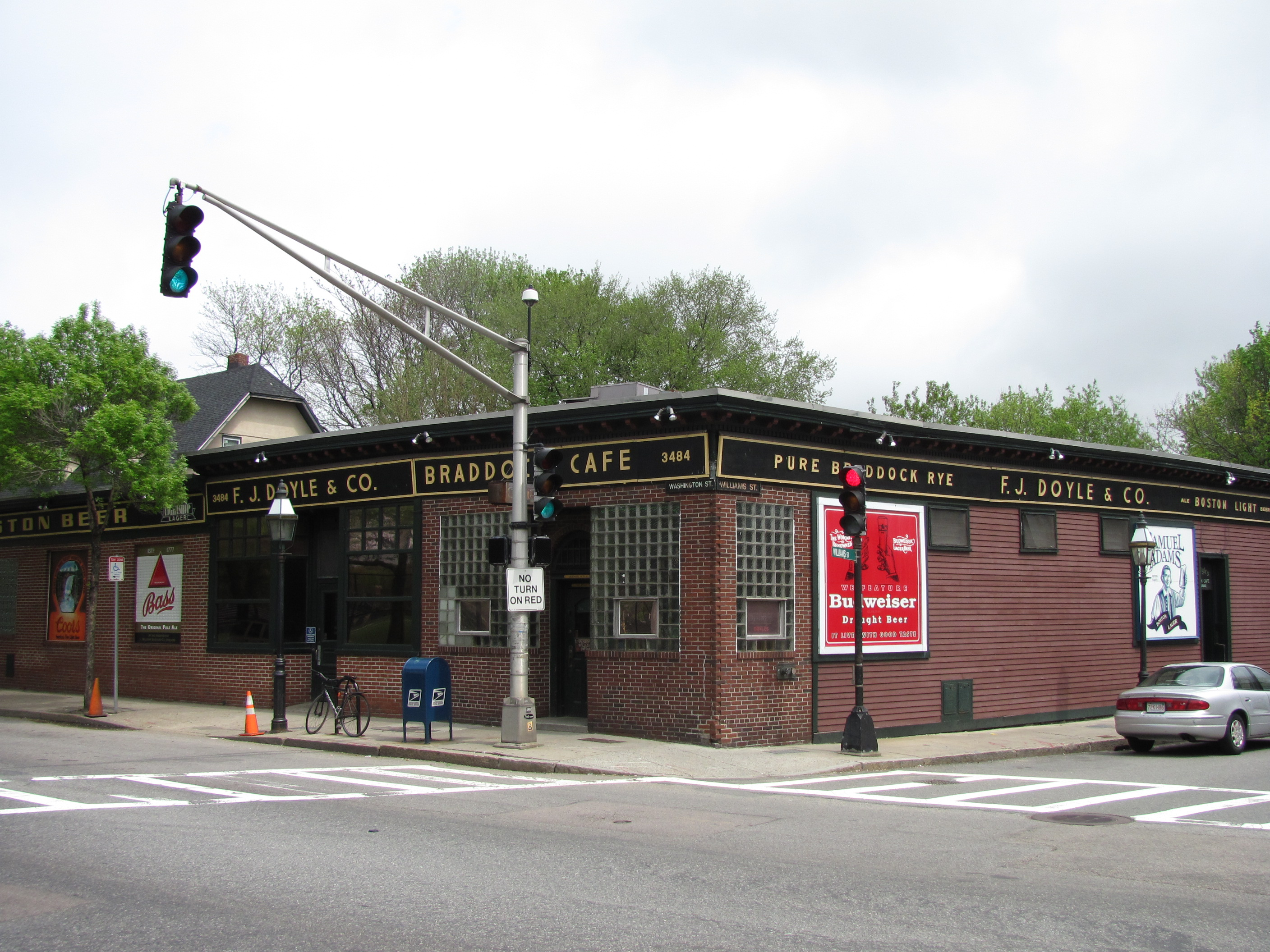
Doyle's Cafe

Defunct restaurants in Boston include:

- Anthony's Pier 4
- Biba
- Brasserie Jo
- Doyle's Cafe
- Durgin-Park
- L'Espalier
- Hamersley's Bistro
- Jacob Wirth Restaurant
- Julien's Restorator
- Locke-Ober
- Young's Hotel

== See also ==
- List of Michelin-starred restaurants in American Northeast Cities
- List of restaurants in Cambridge, Massachusetts
