= List of restaurant districts and streets in the United States =

This is a list of notable restaurant districts and streets in the United States. Restaurant districts and streets are sometimes referred to as "restaurant row".

== Restaurant districts and streets in the United States ==
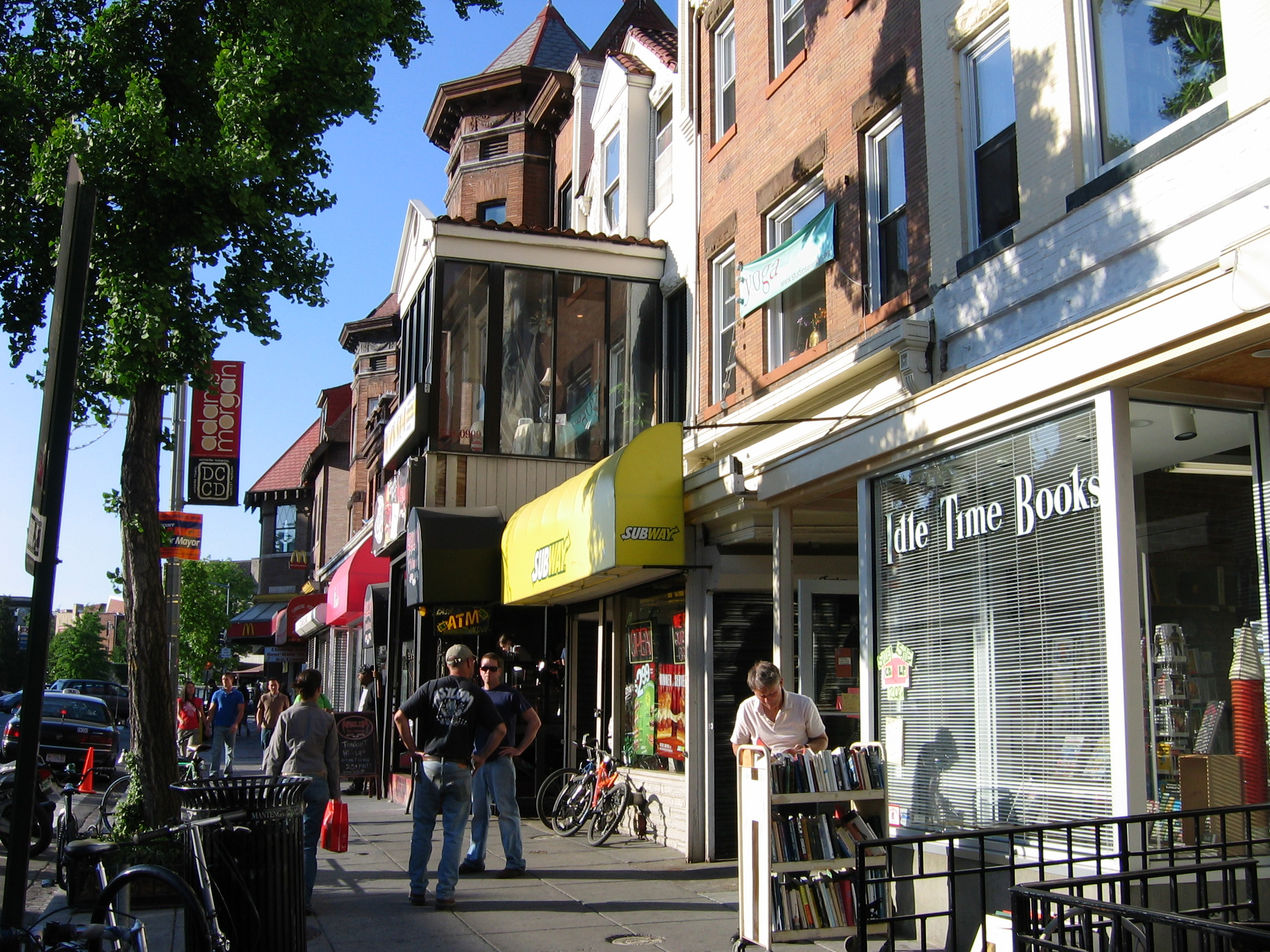
Shops located along 18th Street, NW in Adams Morgan, Northwest Washington, D.C.

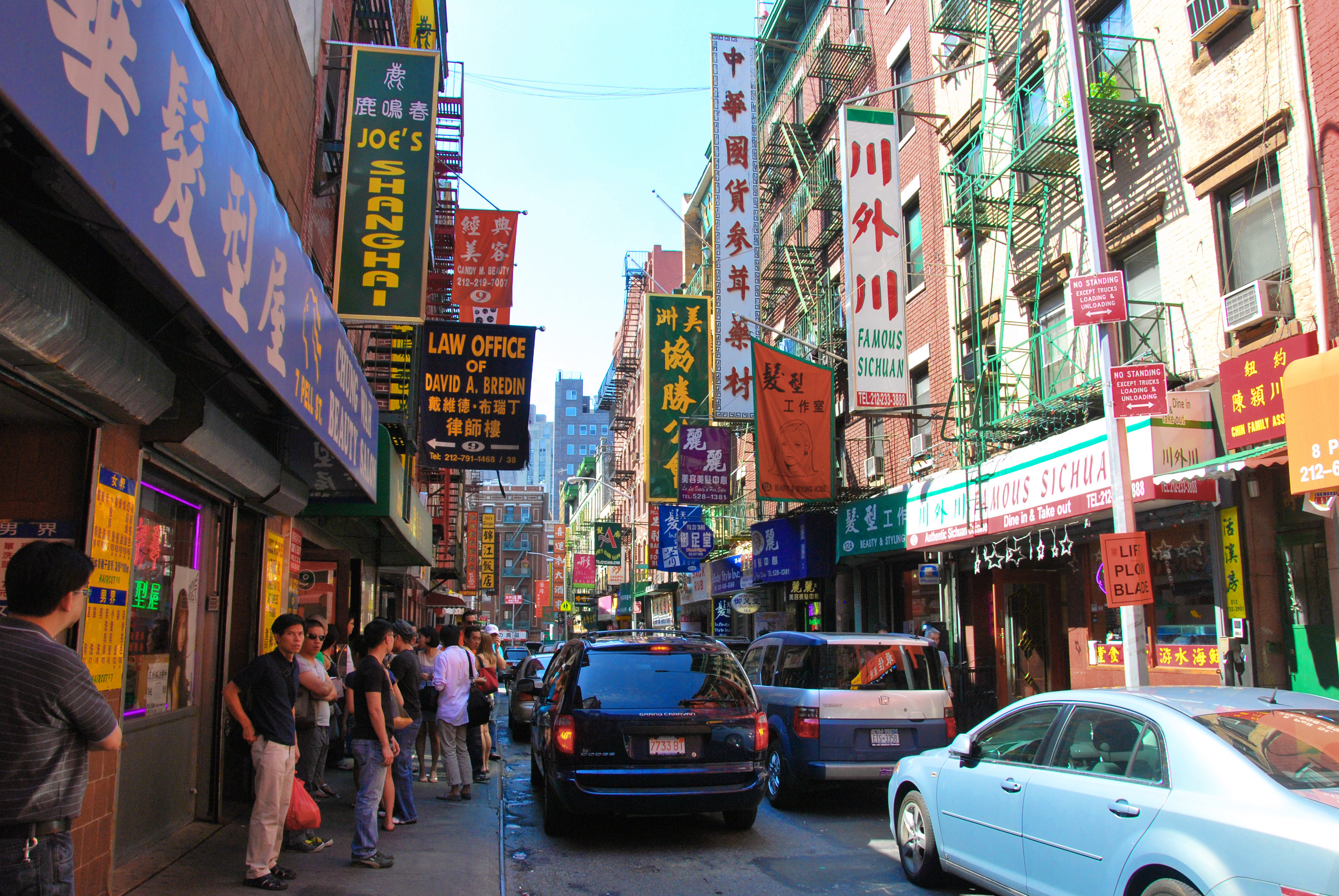
A street scene on Pell Street at Chinatown, Manhattan, New York

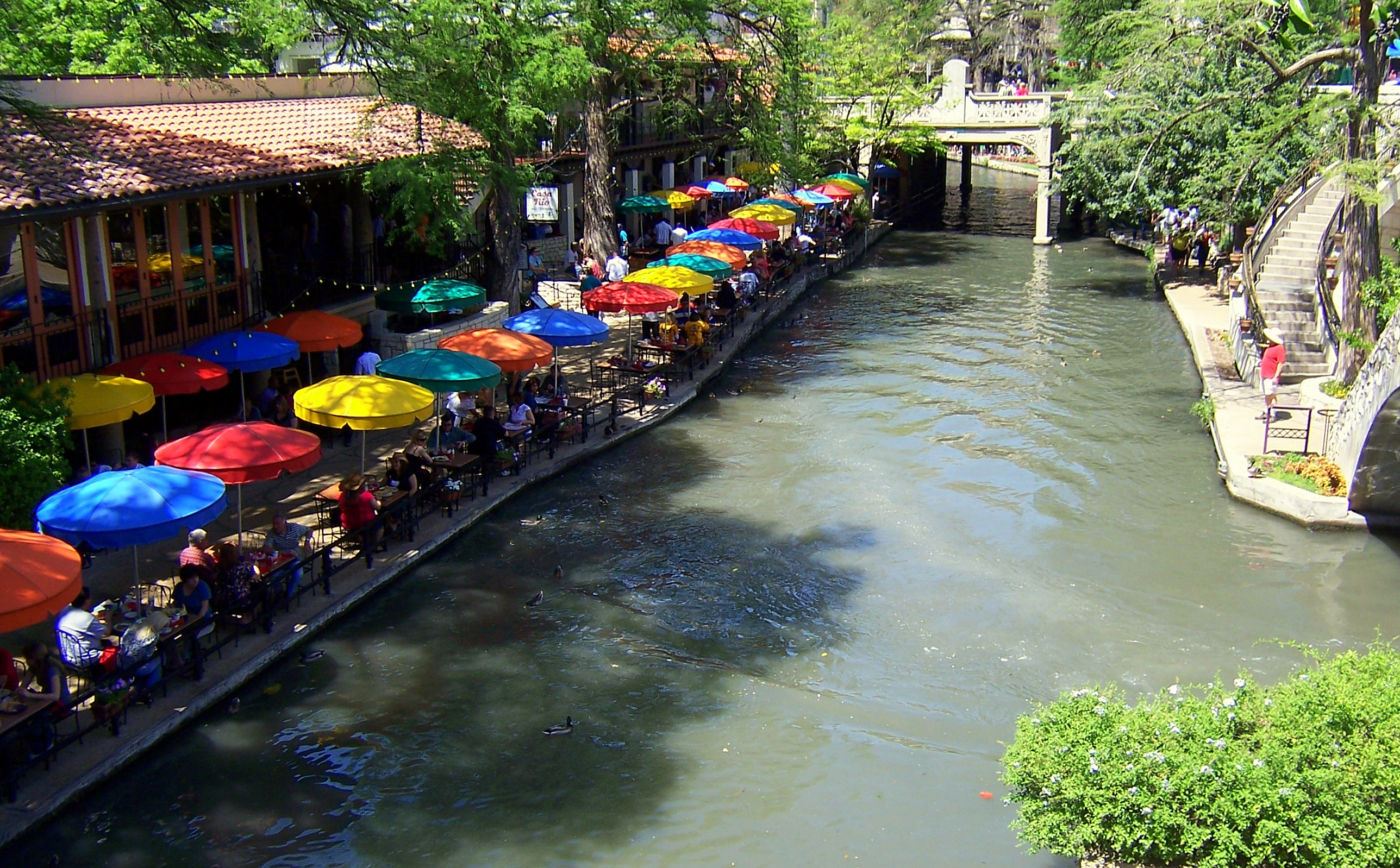
Casa Rio restaurant, San Antonio River Walk, Texas

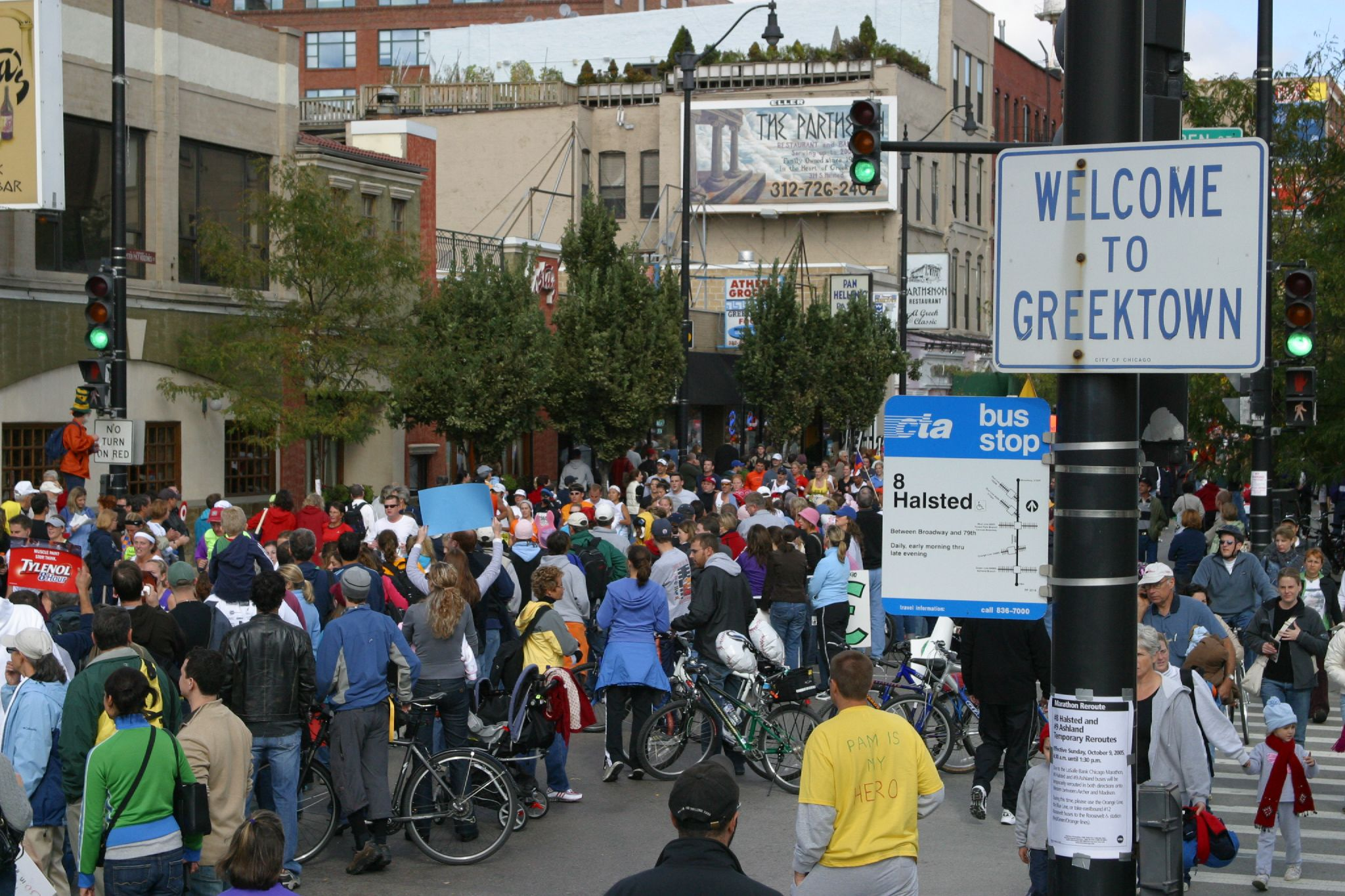
Greektown, Chicago, Illinois

- Adams Morgan, Washington, D.C.
- Beale Street, Memphis, Tennessee
- Brewery District, Columbus, Ohio
- Buffington Harbor, Gary, Indiana
- Buford Highway, Atlanta, Georgia
- Capitol Hill (Denver), Colorado
- Chinatown, Boston, Massachusetts
- Chinatown, Las Vegas, Nevada
- Chinatown, Washington, D.C.
- Delmar Loop, St. Louis, MO
- Crockett Street, Beaumont, Texas
- East 4th Street District (Cleveland), Ohio
- Ferry Street, Newark, New Jersey
- French Quarter, New Orleans, Louisiana
- Garment District (Kansas City, Missouri)
- Greektown, Baltimore, Maryland
- Greektown, Chicago, Illinois
- Hyde Park, Boise, Idaho
- Little Italy, Baltimore, Maryland
- Little Italy, Chicago, Illinois
- Little Italy, Omaha, Nebraska
- Little Italy, Paterson, New Jersey
- Mahatma Gandhi District, Houston, Texas
- Murrells Inlet, South Carolina
- North End, Boston, Massachusetts
- Northside, Cincinnati, Ohio
- Old Market (Omaha, Nebraska)
- River Market District, Little Rock, Arkansas
- San Antonio River Walk, Texas
- Soho (Tampa), Florida
- South Norwalk, Connecticut
- South Trenton, New Jersey
- U Street, Washington, D.C.
- Wooster Square, New Haven, Connecticut
- 14th Street, Washington, D.C.

=== California ===
- Belden Place, San Francisco, California
- Broadway Corridor, Long Beach, California
- Chinatown, Los Angeles, California
- Chinatown, San Francisco, California
- Gourmet Ghetto, neighborhood in Berkeley, California
- Hillcrest, San Diego, California
- Pacific Beach, San Diego, California
- Restaurant Row (Beverly Hills), California
- North Beach, San Francisco, California
- Old Armenian Town, Fresno, California

=== New York ===
- Allentown, Buffalo, New York

New York City:

- Arthur Avenue
- Chinatown, Manhattan, New York
- Curry Row
- Curry Hill
- Koreatown, Manhattan
- Little Brazil, Manhattan, New York
- Little Italy, Manhattan, New York
- Restaurant Row (Manhattan), New York
- Woodside, Queens, New York

== Related lists ==
By U.S. state

- List of restaurants in Hawaii
- List of restaurants in New Jersey
- List of restaurants in Rhode Island

By city location

- List of restaurants in Albuquerque, New Mexico
- List of restaurants in Atlanta
- List of restaurants in Austin, Texas
- List of restaurants in Baltimore
- List of restaurants in Boston
- List of restaurants in Cambridge, Massachusetts
- List of restaurants in Cincinnati
- List of restaurants in Dallas
- List of restaurants in Denver
- List of restaurants in Fort Worth, Texas
- List of restaurants in Houston
- List of restaurants in Huntington, West Virginia
- List of restaurants in the Las Vegas Valley
- List of restaurants in Miami
- List of restaurants in New Orleans
- List of restaurants in New York City
  - List of pizzerias in New York City
- List of restaurants in Philadelphia
- List of restaurants in Portland, Oregon
- List of restaurants in Seattle
- List of restaurants in Tampa, Florida

== See also ==
- List of restaurant districts and streets
- Lists of restaurants
