= 4444 =

4444 may refer to:

- 4444 Escher, a main-belt asteroid
- Four fours, a mathematical puzzle
- The Fours, a New Brunswick, New Jersey–based rock group
- ProRes 4444, a video codec developed by Apple Inc.
- A year in the 5th millennium
- 4-4-4-4, a type of steam locomotive
