= Somaek (restaurant) =

Restaurant in Boston, Massachusetts, U.S.

- Interactive map of Somaek

Restaurant information
- Location: 11 Temple Place, Boston, Massachusetts, 02111, United States
- Coordinates: 42°21′19″N 71°03′45″W

Somaek is a restaurant in Boston, Massachusetts. It was included in The New York Times's 2024 list of the 50 best restaurants in the United States.

== See also ==
- List of restaurants in Boston
