= River Market District (Little Rock, Arkansas) =

Area of Little Rock, Arkansas

River Market
- Neighborhood of Little Rock, Arkansas
- River Market District
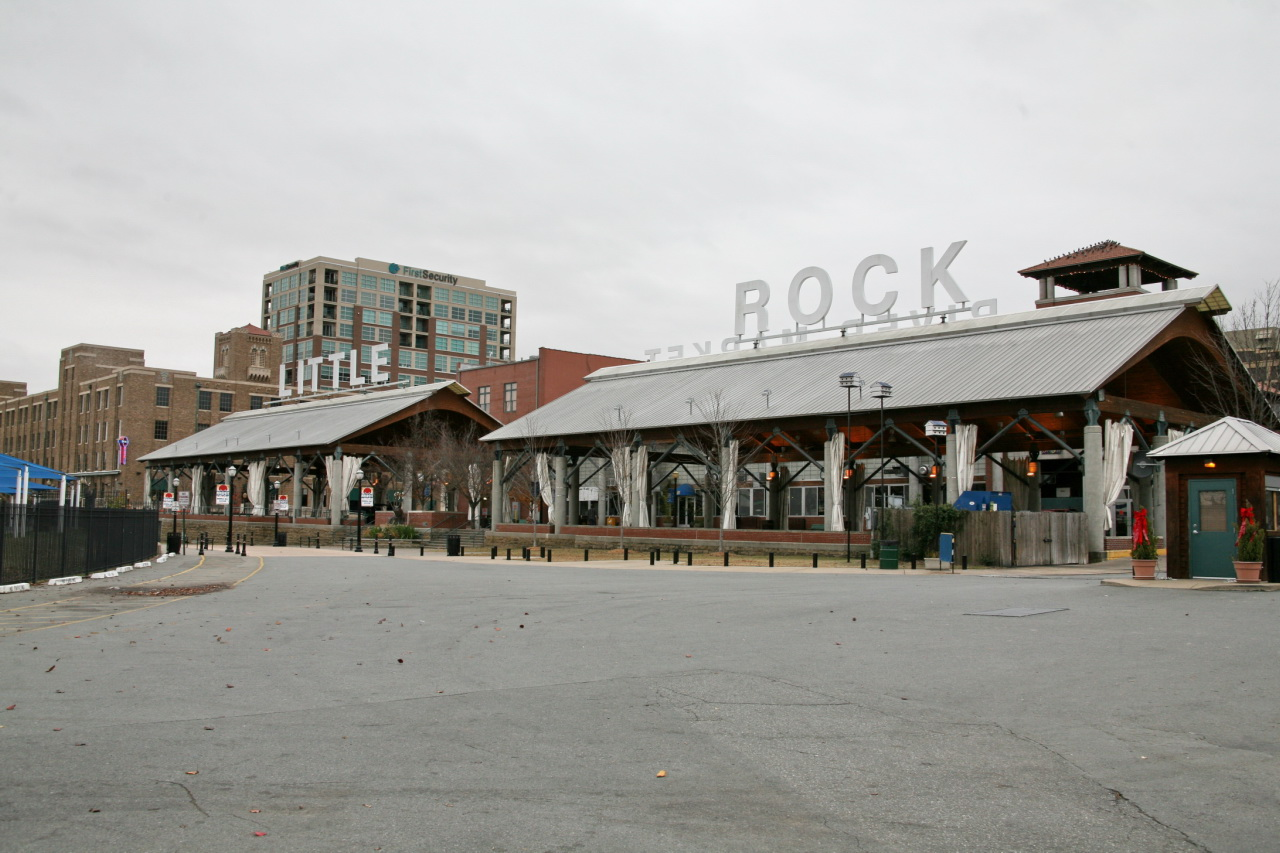
- Interactive map of River Market
- Coordinates: 34°44′51.7″N 92°15′58.2″W
- Country: United States
- State: Arkansas
- County: Pulaski
- Township: Big Rock
- Opened: 1996; 30 years ago
- Website: rivermarket.info

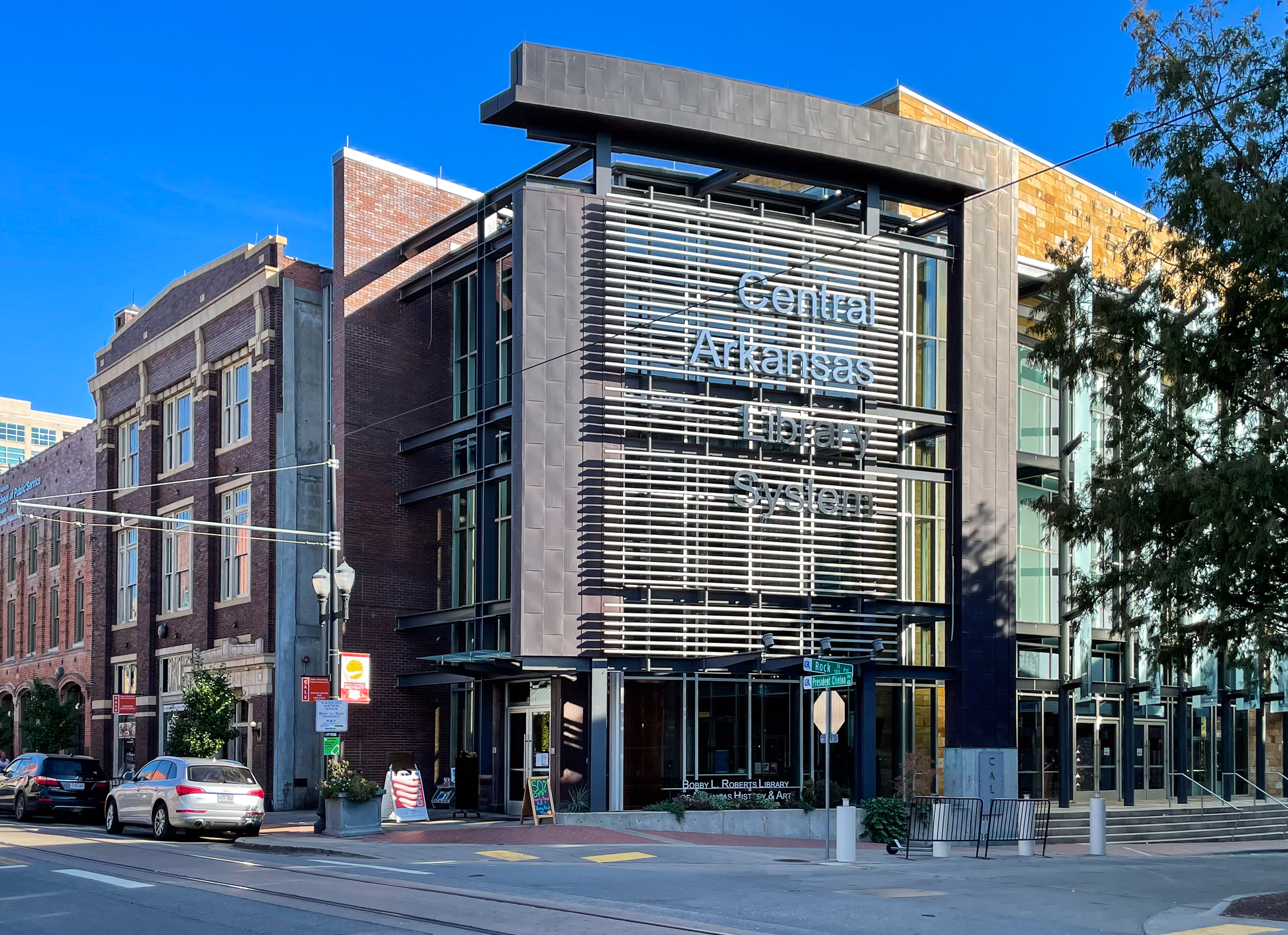
Bobby L. Roberts Library of Arkansas History & Art,

The River Market District (also known as River Market Entertainment District or simply as the River Market) is a city park and network of walkways along the banks of the Arkansas River at Little Rock, Arkansas, United States. Lined by bars, shops, restaurants, nature, public artwork, and the five historic missions, the River Market is an important part of the city's urban fabric and a tourist attraction in its own right.

== Landmarks ==
At its heart is the Ottenheimer Market Hall, built in 1996 as part of the city's urban revitalization project, capitalizing on the river frontage. It was refurbished in 2014 to house a number of vendors. The city's weekly farmers' market is held here at the market pavilion. Also within the district at its eastern end is the William J. Clinton Presidential Library and Museum, built in 2004; the Cox Creative Center; the Museum of Discovery; the Bobby L. Roberts Library of Arkansas History & Art; Riverfest Amphitheater; Riverfront Park and the Arkansas River Trail.

== Transportation ==
Both of Little Rock's two historic streetcar lines, the Green Line and the Blue Line runs through the district.

== See also ==
- List of restaurant districts and streets in the United States
