= 311 Omakase =

Restaurant in Boston, Massachusetts, U.S.

- Owner: Wei Chen
- Food type: Japanese
- Rating: (Michelin Guide)
- Location: 605 Tremont St, Boston, Massachusetts, 02118, United States
- Coordinates: 42°20′35″N 71°04′25″W
- Seating Capacity: 10
- Website: https://311boston.com/home

311 Omakase is a Michelin-starred restaurant in Boston, Massachusetts, United States. It was founded by Wei Chen in summer 2023. 311 Omakase received one Michelin Star in November 2025.

== History ==
Over a decade ago, Wei Chen moved from Fuijian Province, China to Boston to join his sister, who is also in the restaurant business. While working at his brother-in-law’s restaurant as a sushi chef, he became interested in Japanese cuisine. But at the time, Boston didn't have an established omakase scene, so he moved to New York City and eventually worked under Masa Takayama, owner of the first Michelin-three-star Omakase in the United States, which held that title until November 2025, losing their third star, which they held since 2008.

== Menu ==
311 Omakase serves an 18-course Japanese seafood meal, which changes regularly, and pricing starts at $230 per person (not including fees, gratuities, side dishes, and beverages), but a course early-on is occasionally kegani, ikura kanpachi monaka, and salmon. According to the Michelin Guide, 311 Omakase, "features impressive nigiri showcasing high-quality product, much of it imported from Japan; and the range of fish could include fluke, striped beakfish and goldeneye snapper. Cooked items precede the sushi and highlight a particular cooking method, such as delicately crunchy fried longtooth grouper with ponzu sauce or a simmered bowlful of amadai and abalone in dashi." 311 Omakase does not serve alcohol, due to Chen not obtaining a liquor license, which Chen is working on getting.

== See also ==
- List of Michelin-starred restaurants in American Northeast Cities
- List of restaurants in Boston
