= O Ya (restaurant) =

Japanese restaurant in Boston, Massachusetts, U.S.

- Interactive map of O Ya

Restaurant information
- Owners: Tim and Nancy Cushman
- Food type: Japanese
- Location: 9 East Street, Boston, Massachusetts, 02111, U.S.
- Coordinates: 42°21′5.3″N 71°3′24.9″W
- Other locations: 120 East 28th Street, Manhattan, NY 10016; Anatole France 70, Polanco III, Ciudad de México, Mexico City 11550
- Website: www.o-ya.restaurant/location/o-ya-boston/

O Ya is a Japanese omakase-style restaurant in Boston, Massachusetts. The restaurant is owned by Tim and Nancy Cushman.

== Overview ==
There have been O Ya outposts on the east side of Manhattan and in Mexico City. The Boston location opened in 2007. The New York City location closed permanently in 2020.

The menu has included sushi, sashimi, nigiri, and small plates.

== Reception ==
In 2022, O Ya was named Best Japanese Restaurant in Boston magazine's Best of Boston list.

== See also ==
- List of Japanese restaurants
- List of restaurants in Boston
- List of restaurants in Mexico
- List of restaurants in New York City
