= Nataing =

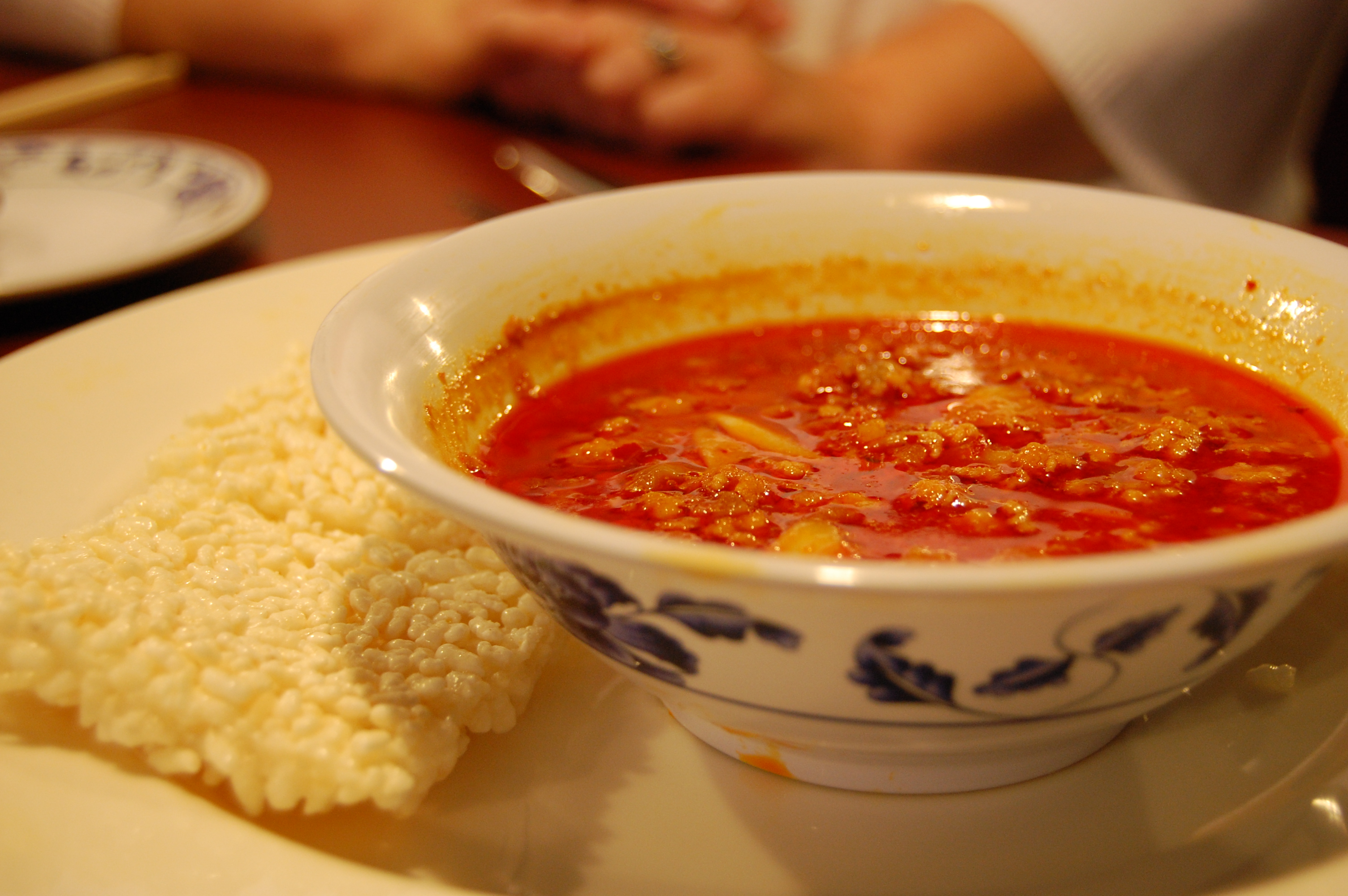
- Nataing with rice crackers
- Alternative names: Khao Tang Na Tang
- Place of origin: Cambodia or Thailand
- Main ingredients: Ground pork, cloves, shallots, coconut milk, peanuts, fish sauce, rice cakes
- Food energy (per serving): 450 kcal (1,900 kJ)
Nutritional value
(per serving)
- Protein: 15 g
- Fat: 39 g
- Carbohydrate: 15 g

Nataing (Khmer: ណាតាំង) or Khao Tang Na Tang (Thai: ข้าวตังหน้าตั้ง) is a Cambodian and Thai style red pork curry dip. It is a creamy ground pork dish cooked in coconut milk, often served with rice cakes.

It is one of Cambodian cuisine's most sophisticated and popular appetizers due to its many fragrant ingredients.

== Origin ==
It is often considered to be either a royal Khmer or royal Thai dish and is claimed by both Cambodia and Thailand. In Cambodia, nataing is believed to have ultimately originated from the countryside as a way to eat rice crust (Khmer: បាយកាដាង, bai kdaing) from rice stuck on the bottom of the cooking pot or rice crackers made from flattened and sun-dried leftover rice.

== Variations ==
Longteine De Monteiro's 1998 The Elephant Walk Cookbook alternatively suggests serving the dip on slices of quickly fried baguette or pairing nataing with pickled vegetables or other acidic side dishes. A variation of nataing favored by the Khmer royalty uses chicken meat that has been finely strained before cooking. An even more extravagant version incorporates lobster as the main ingredient.

In a vegan variation of nataing, ground pork is substituted with tofu or seitan and fish sauce is replaced with light soy sauce.
