= Elephant Walk (restaurant) =

French and Cambodian restaurant

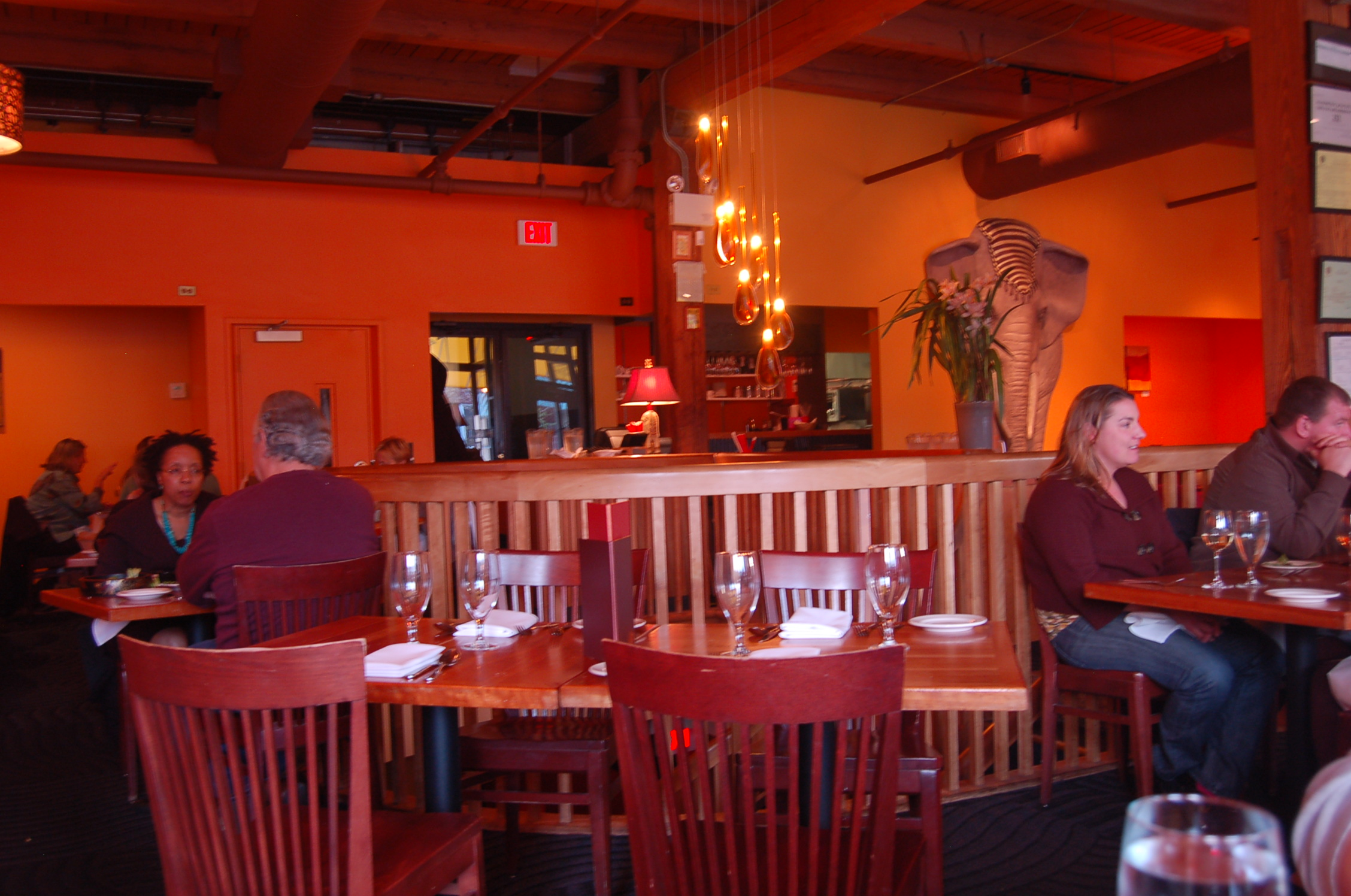
- Elephant Walk restaurant in 2010
- Interactive map of Elephant Walk

Restaurant information
- Established: 1991
- Food type: French and Cambodian cuisine
- Location: 1415 Washington Street, Boston, Suffolk, Massachusetts, MA 02118, United States
- Coordinates: 42.3411°N 71.0705°W
- Website: elephantwalkboston.com

Elephant Walk is a French and Cambodian restaurant established in 1991 by Longteine "Nyep" de Monteiro.

== Name ==
The working name for the restaurant in the early stages of construction had been "Cambodia Café", which was criticized by Bob Perry's mother, Pat Perry, as too literal, trite, and boring. Instead, she suggested the name "Elephant Walk" as a reference to the 1954 movie of the same name and due to the importance of elephants in Cambodian culture and history.

== Background ==
Longteine de Monteiro was the wife to the Cambodian Ambassador to Taiwan Kenthao de Monteiro when Phnom Penh fell to the Khmer Rouge in 1975. Their French diplomatic friends arranged for the family to move to France, where they settled in Beziers. There to make a living, Longteine, who had previously learned French cooking and taken Chinese cooking lessons in Taiwan, opened a Cambodian restaurant, Amrita, in 1980, which became a success. After Longteine's daughter Nadsa got married in 1986 and returned to the United States in 1987, becoming a citizen in 1990, Longteine also moved to the United States.

== History ==
Elephant Walk was opened in 1991 in Union Square, Somerville, Massachusetts, by Longteine "Nyep" de Monteiro with the help of her daughter Nadsa and son-in-law Bob Perry. At the time of opening, it was Boston's only Cambodian restaurant and only one of two restaurants serving two complete menus. In 1993, Nadsa left her job as a travel agent and worked full-time at the restaurant as a sous-chef.

After the arrival of Longteine's elder daughter Launa and her French husband Gerard Lopez from France in late 1993, a second Elephant Walk restaurant was opened in Boston in late 1994. In late 1997, they opened a third restaurant, Carambola, in Waltham, Massachusetts, which served exclusively Cambodian cuisine. Shortly after that, the original Elephant Walk restaurant was moved to Cambridge, Massachusetts. In 2005, a French menu was added to the Carambola's Cambodian menu and it was also renamed to Elephant Walk. In 2013, the Elephant Walk restaurant in Waltham was closed.

In 2014, after more than 20 years of operation, the Elephant Walk was moved from Beacon Street to 1415 Washington Street, at a former location of BoMa gastropub. In 2017, the Elephant Walk in Cambridge was closed.

== Menus ==
The restaurant offers two menus – a French and a Cambodian menu. The French menu has included dishes such as steak au poivre, saumon à l'oseille, coq au vin, and canard à l'orange, whereas the Cambodian menu has included dishes, such as rouleaux, nataing, b'baw mouan, salade Cambodgienne, nyoum sarai, loc lac, and mee siem.

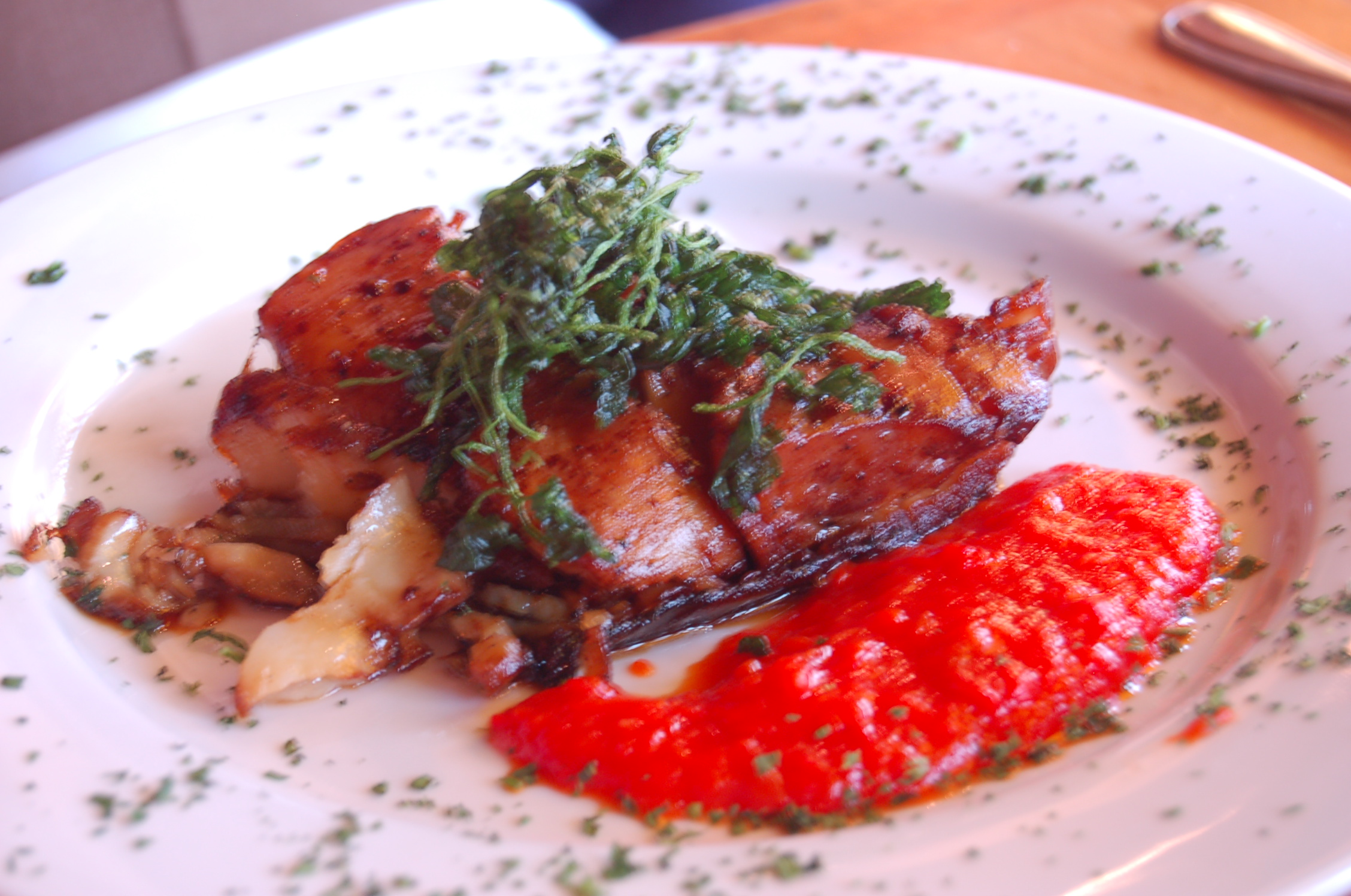
Cod Special

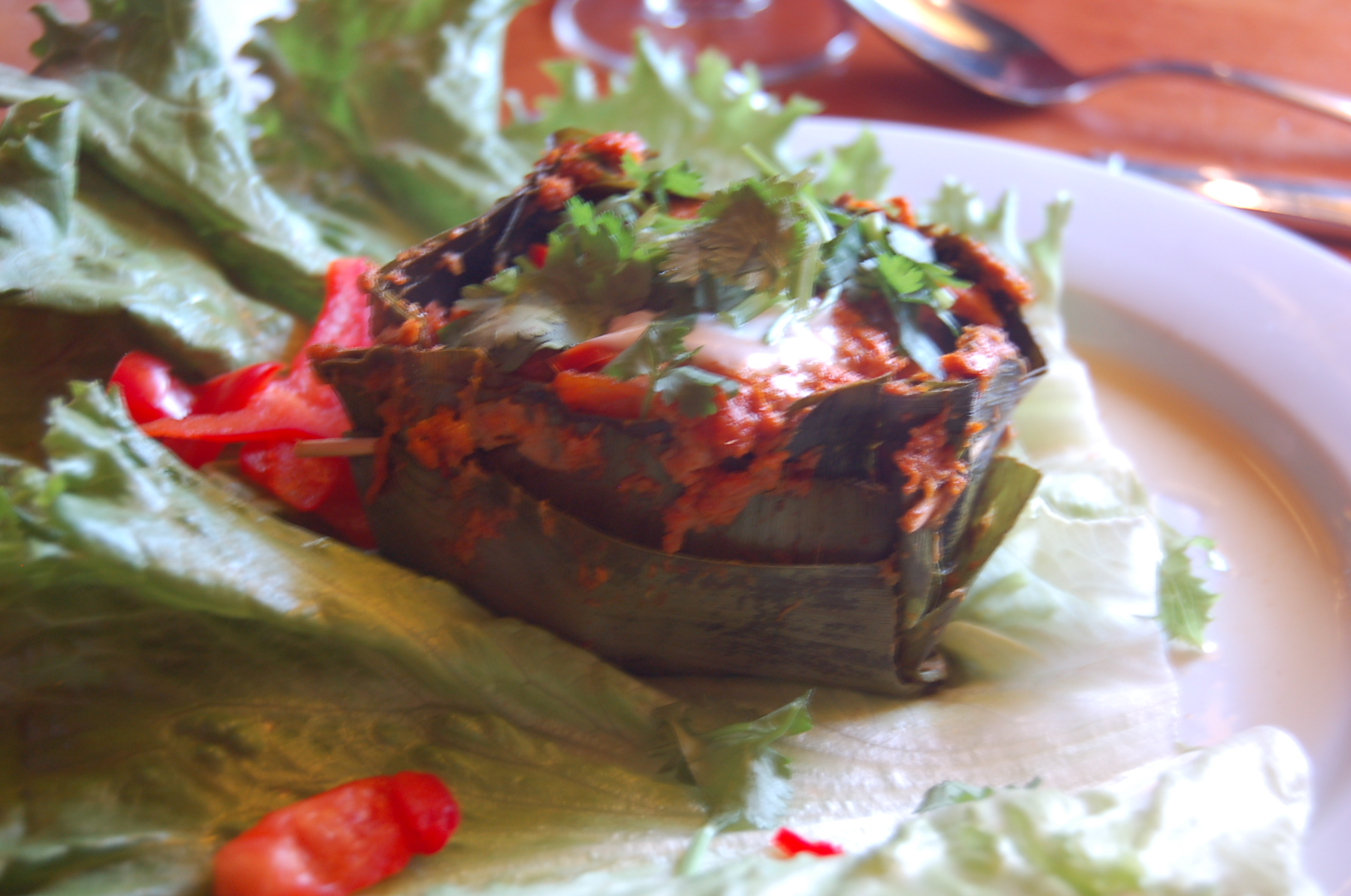
Amok Royal

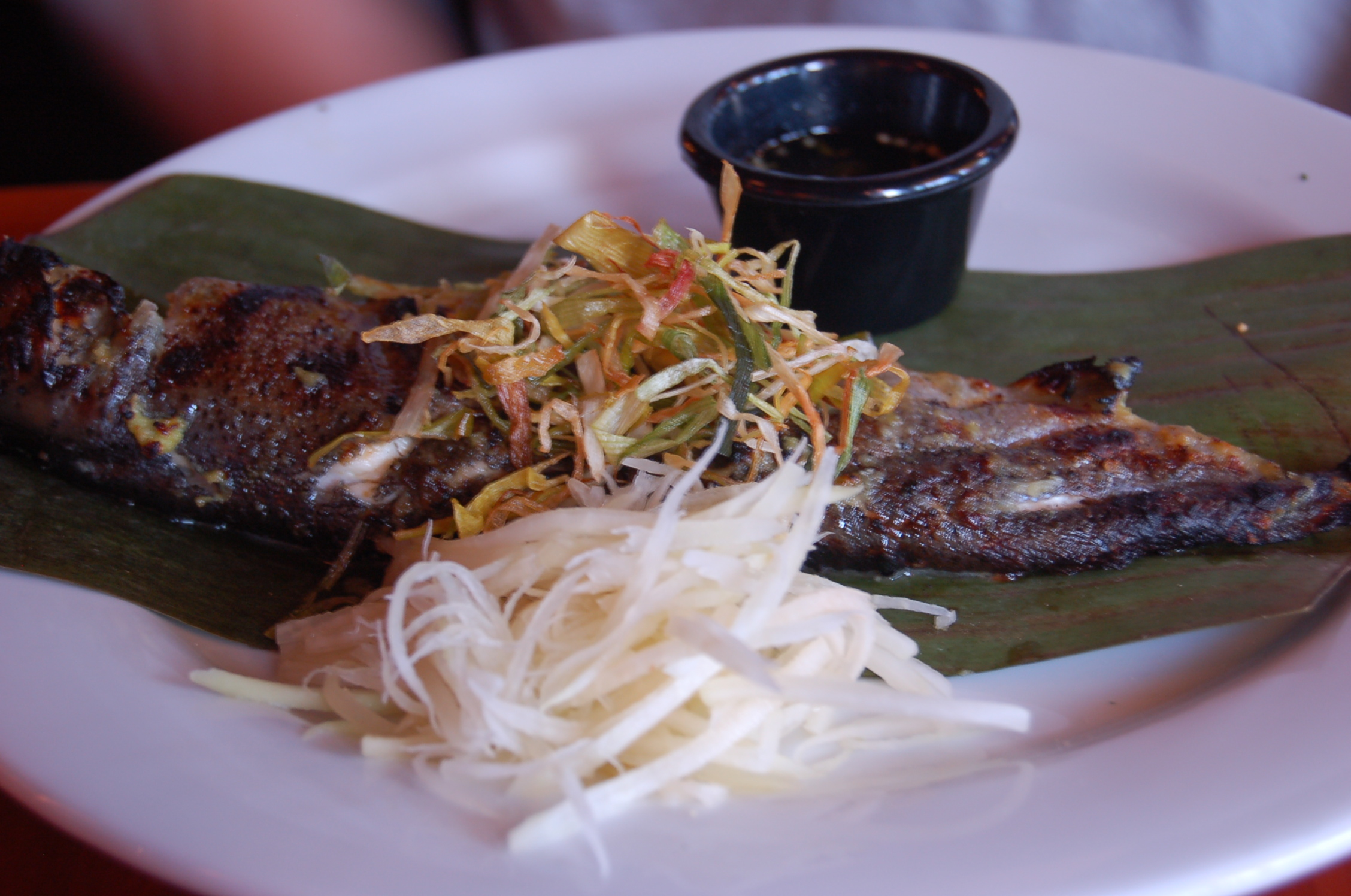
Trey Ang

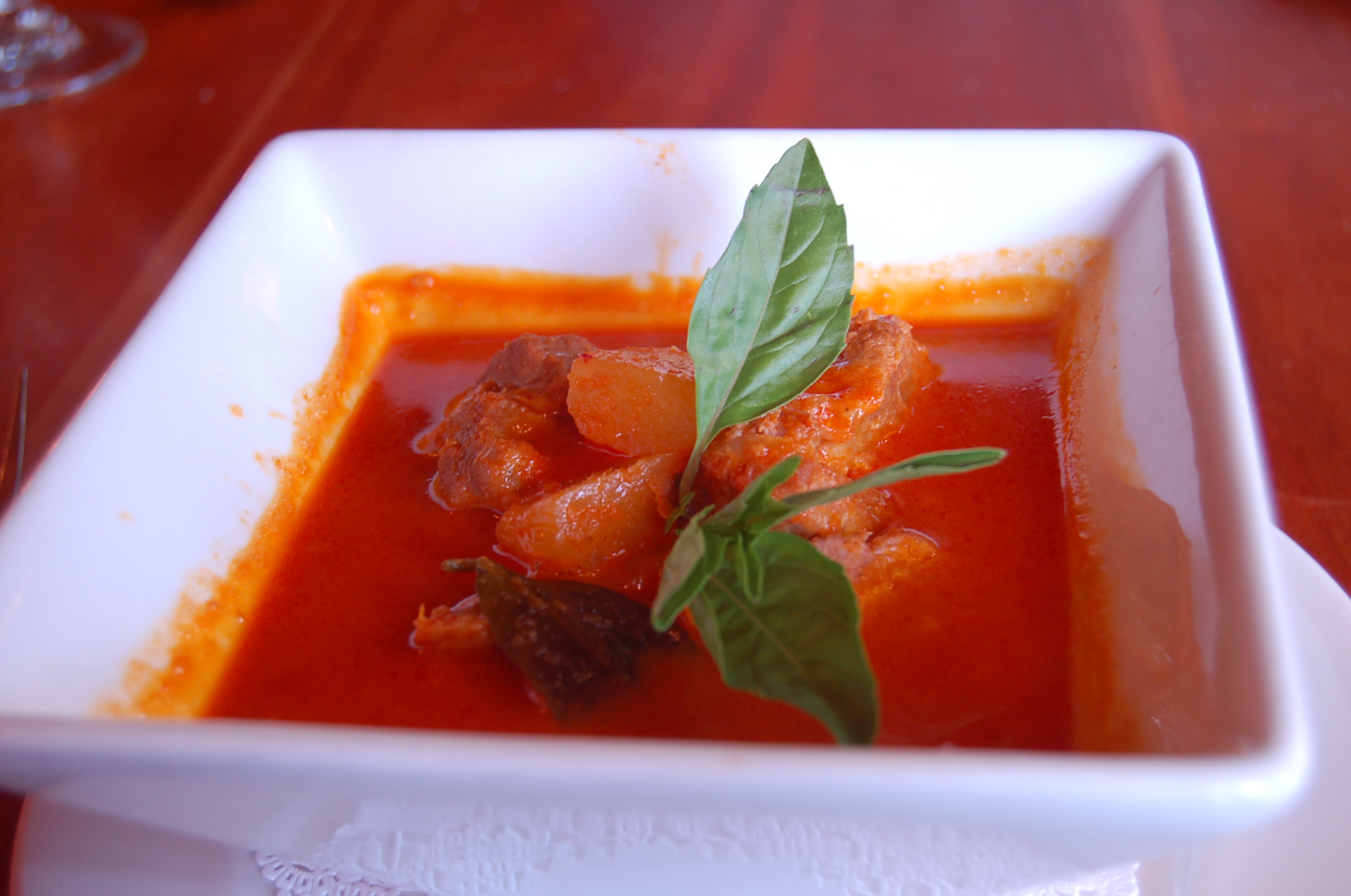
Keing D'Ananas

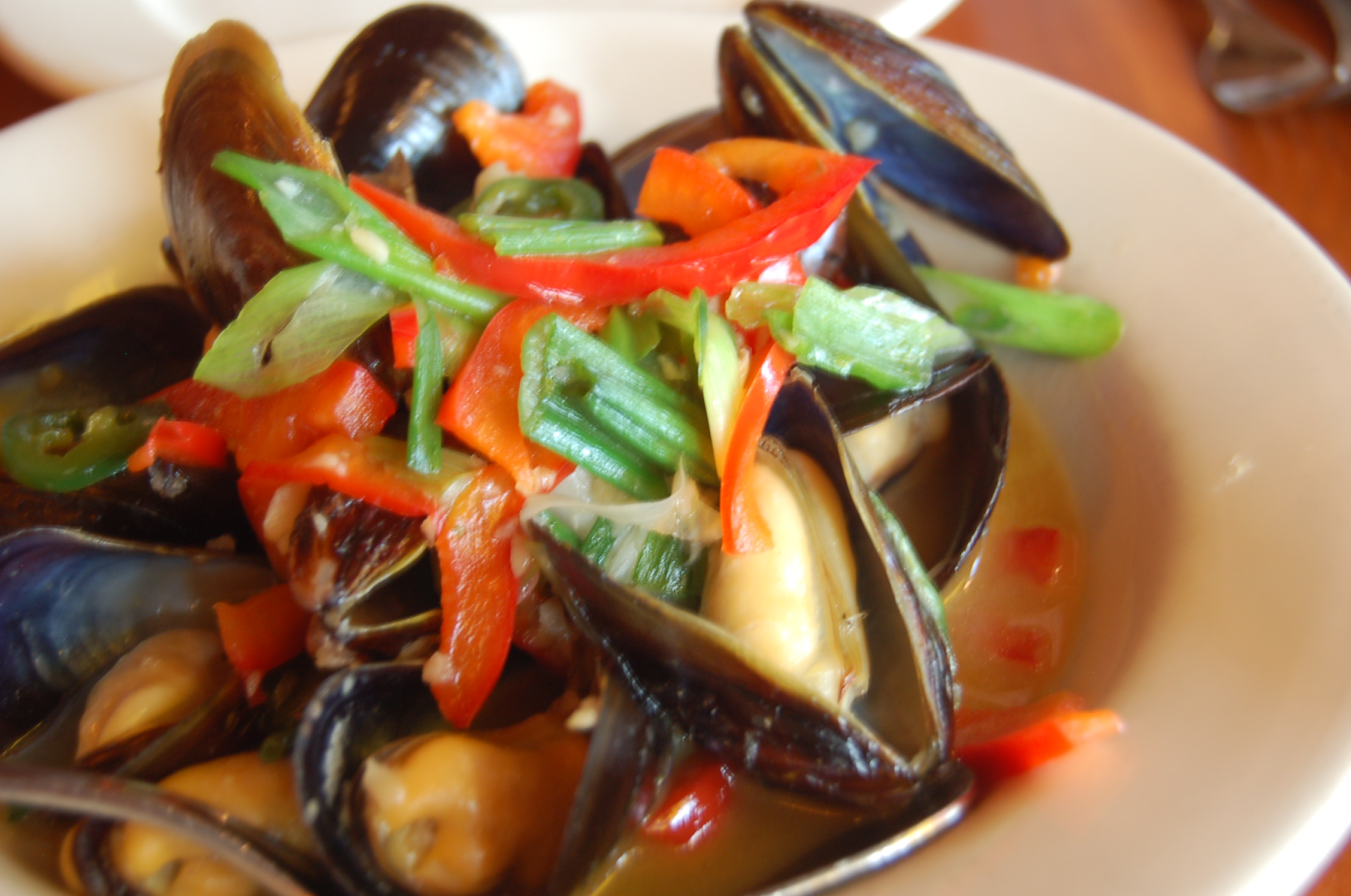
Leah Chah

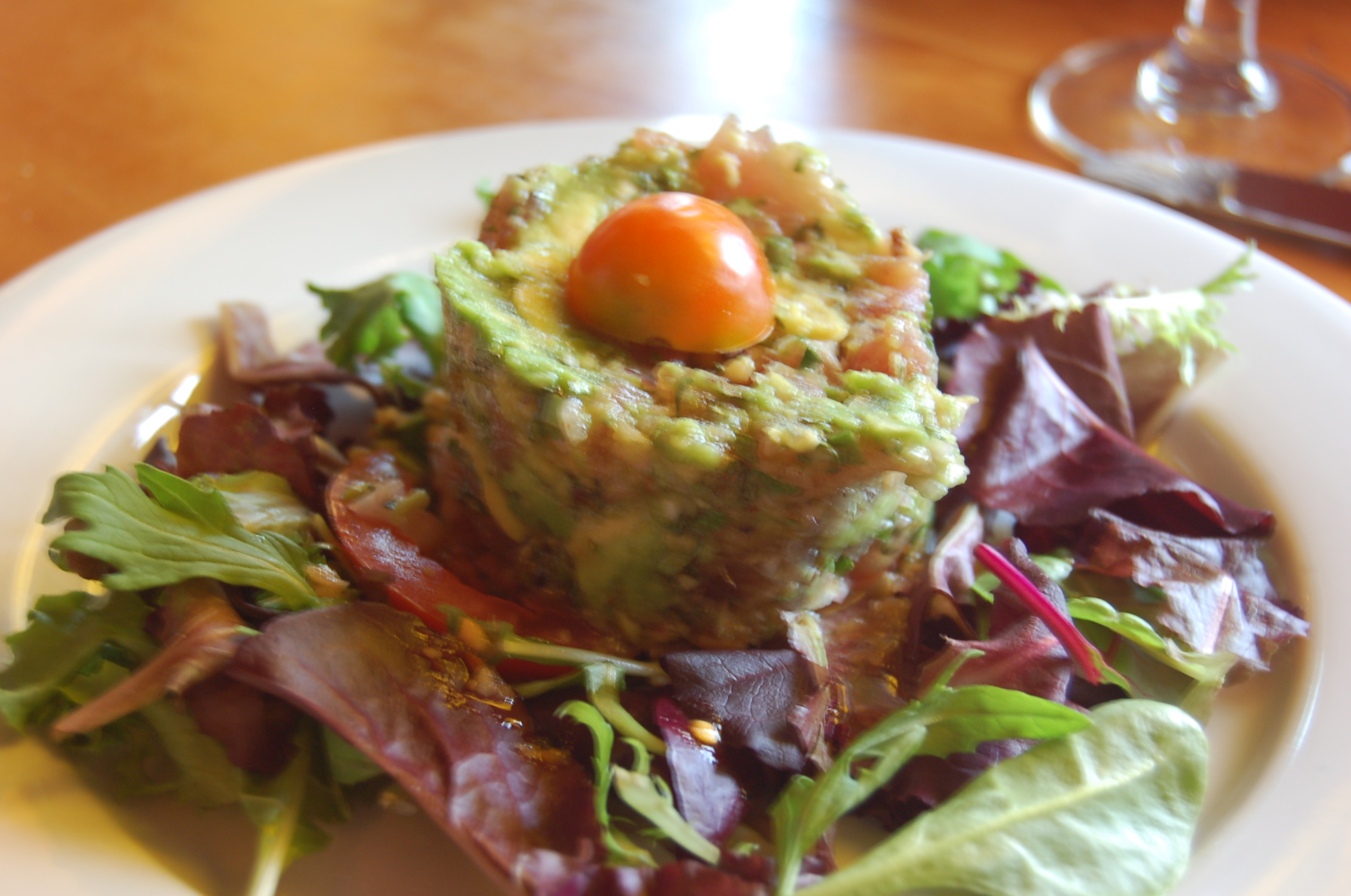
Tuna Tartare

== Reception ==
In 1992, Elephant Walk was named one of America's Best New Restaurants by Esquire Magazine, who described it as "absolutely delicious and enlightening." and since then it has become the most famous Cambodian restaurant in the United States.

In 1998, Carambola was praised as "one of Greater Boston's most treasured restaurants" and "the most immediately satisfying and consistent of their restaurant ventures thus far" by Robert Nadeau of The Boston Phoenix.

In 2022, the Elephant Walk in Boston was described as "one of the most unique flavor profiles in the city".

== The Elephant Walk Cookbook ==
In 1998, Houghton Mifflin Harcourt published Longteine de Monteiro's "The Elephant Walk Cookbook", a collection of more than 150 Cambodian recipes she co-authored with food writer Katherine Neustadt. It was the first Cambodian American cookbook and has become the best-known Cambodian cookbook in English.

The cookbook was lauded as a "masterpiece" and "first rate cookbook" in an early review by The Austin Chronicle, who praised its extensive introduction of the lesser-known culture and history of Cambodia, as well as a diverse and comprehensive selection of recipes covering "incredible range" of dishes "with clear, concise directions".

== See also ==
- List of restaurants in Boston
- List of French restaurants
