= The Paramount (Boston restaurant) =

Restaurant in Boston, Massachusetts, U.S.

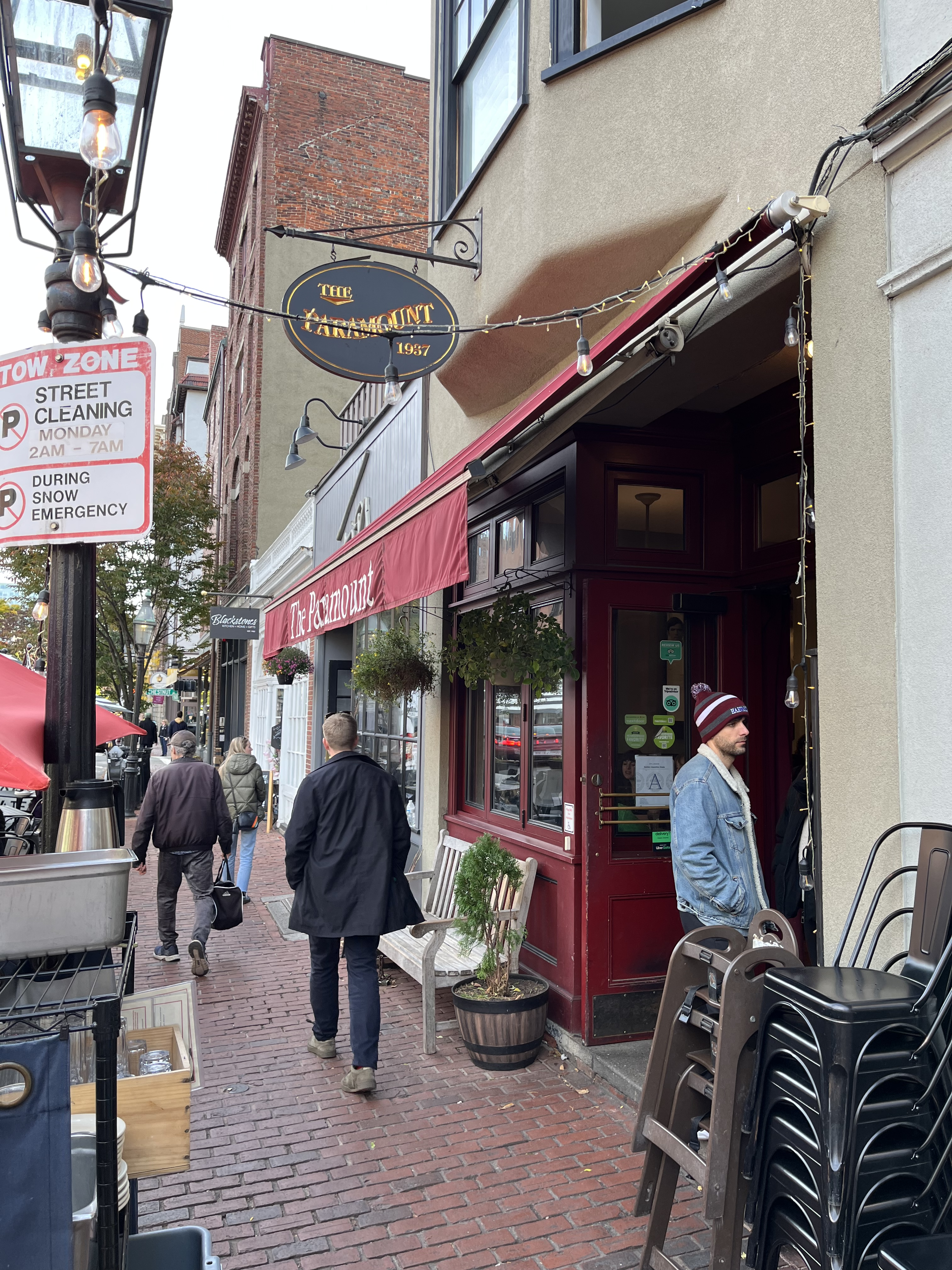
- The frontage of the business in 2022
- Interactive map of The Paramount

Restaurant information
- Established: 1937 (89 years ago)
- Owners: Michael Bissanti (since 1995); Michael Colon (since 1995); Joe Green (since 1995)
- Location: 44 Charles Street, Boston, Suffolk County, Massachusetts, 02114, United States
- Coordinates: 42.357282°N 71.070166°W
- Seating capacity: 44 (Beacon Hill location)
- Website: www.paramountboston.com

The Paramount is a diner-style restaurant in the Beacon Hill neighborhood of downtown Boston, Massachusetts, United States. Situated at 44 Charles Street, it was established in 1937. It is owned by Michael Bissanti, Michael Conlon and Joe Greene, three college friends from La Salle Academy in New York City.

The restaurant has a policy by which no patron, or a member of a patron's party, may occupy a table until their food is ready. It was implemented to ensure that other patrons, more often than not, can find a table when their food is ready.

The restaurant won the Best of Boston "Best Beacon Hill Restaurant" award in 2009.

A second location was opened at 667 East Broadway in South Boston in December 2011.

In 2015, the restaurant was sued after employees claimed they were underpaid for overtime worked.
