= Doyle's Cafe =

Restaurant in Boston, Massachusetts, U.S.

Coordinates: 42°18′23.40″N 71°06′26.28″W

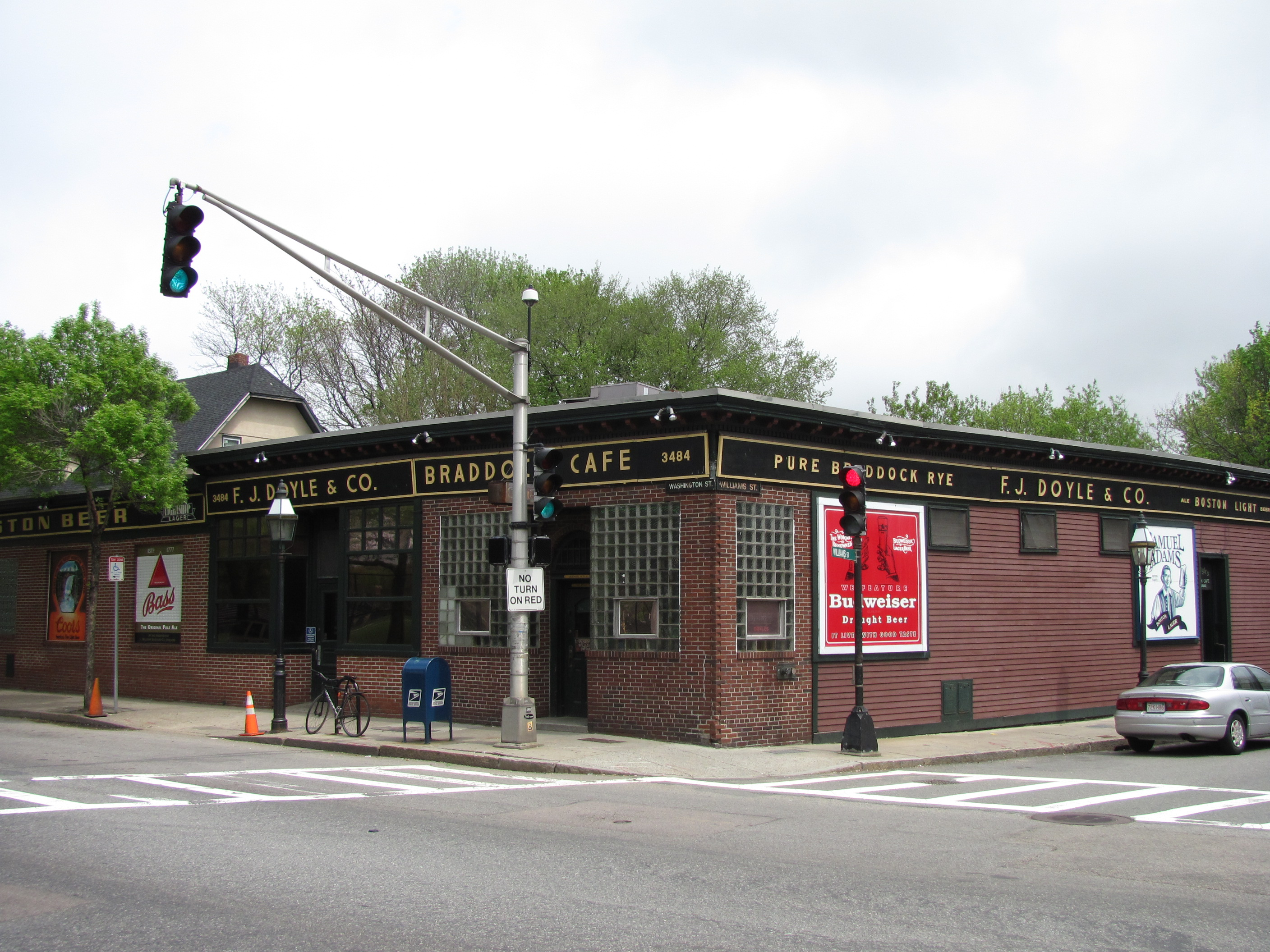
- Interactive map of Doyle's Cafe
- Address: 3484 Washington Street; Boston, Massachusetts; United States

Website
- doylescafeboston.com

Doyle's Cafe was a pub located on Washington Street in the Jamaica Plain neighborhood of Boston, Massachusetts, United States. Doyle's Cafe was established in 1882 and is located near the Samuel Adams brewery. Its close proximity to the brewery afforded Doyle's the unique opportunity to serve new or experimental Samuel Adams beers. It is also where Samuel Adams Boston Lager was first put on tap. Throughout its history, Doyle's was known as a favorite watering hole for both local and national politicians. On St. Patrick's Day in 1988, Senator Ted Kennedy helped dedicate a new room at the location to his maternal grandfather, John F. Fitzgerald.

Given its historic look, atmosphere and popularity in the LGBTQ community the Irish pub has been used in several Hollywood movies and television series. Shots of the exterior of the building were used in the television series Boston Public. The pub also appeared in films such as 21, Patriots Day, Celtic Pride, Mystic River, and The Brink's Job. A local bartender who appeared in the film eventually moved to California to pursue acting.

Doyle's permanently closed at midnight on October 26, 2019. However, in October 2021, a development project to revive Doyle's was approved.
