= List of restaurants in Cambridge, Massachusetts =

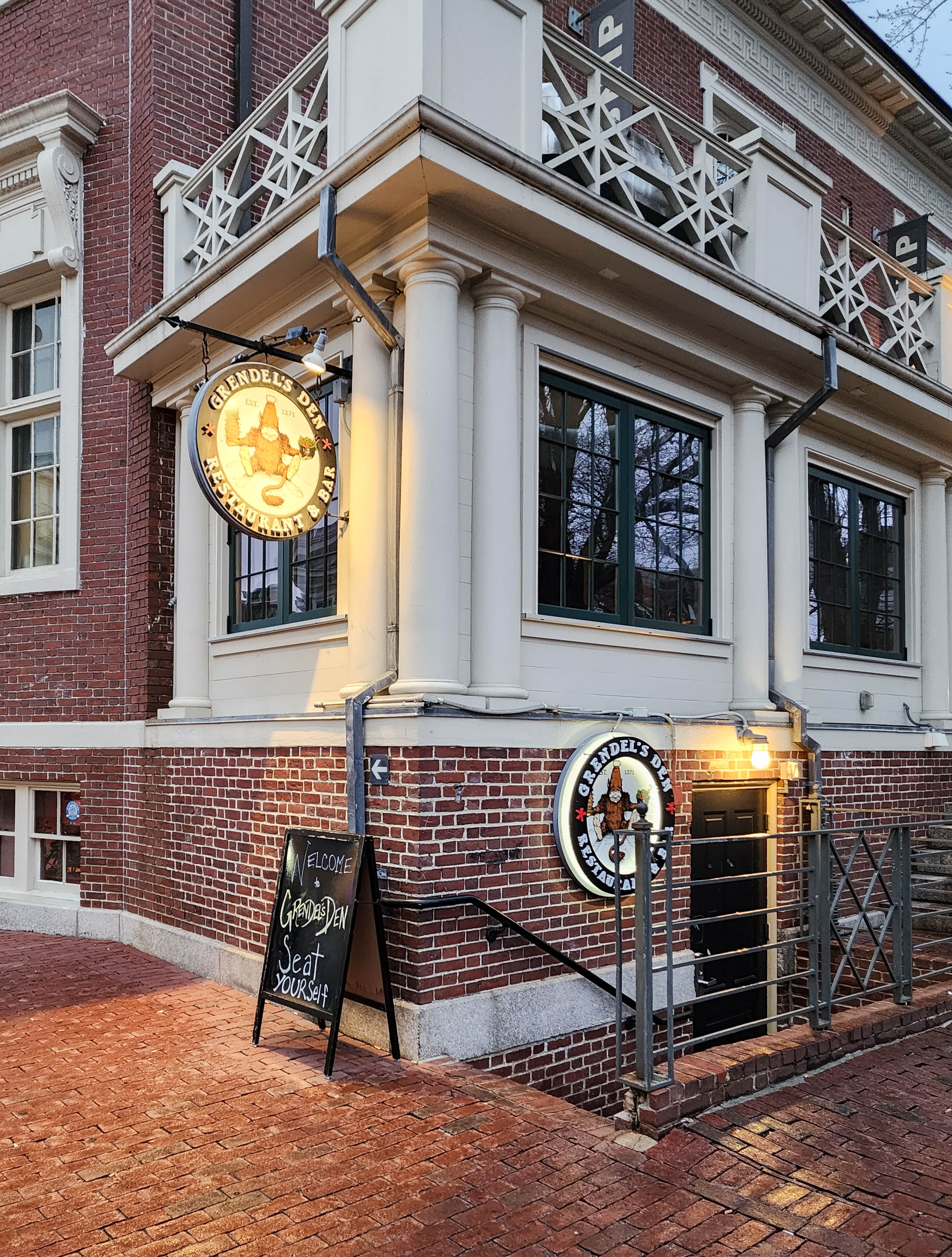
Grendel's Den

This is a list of notable restaurants in Cambridge, Massachusetts:

== List ==
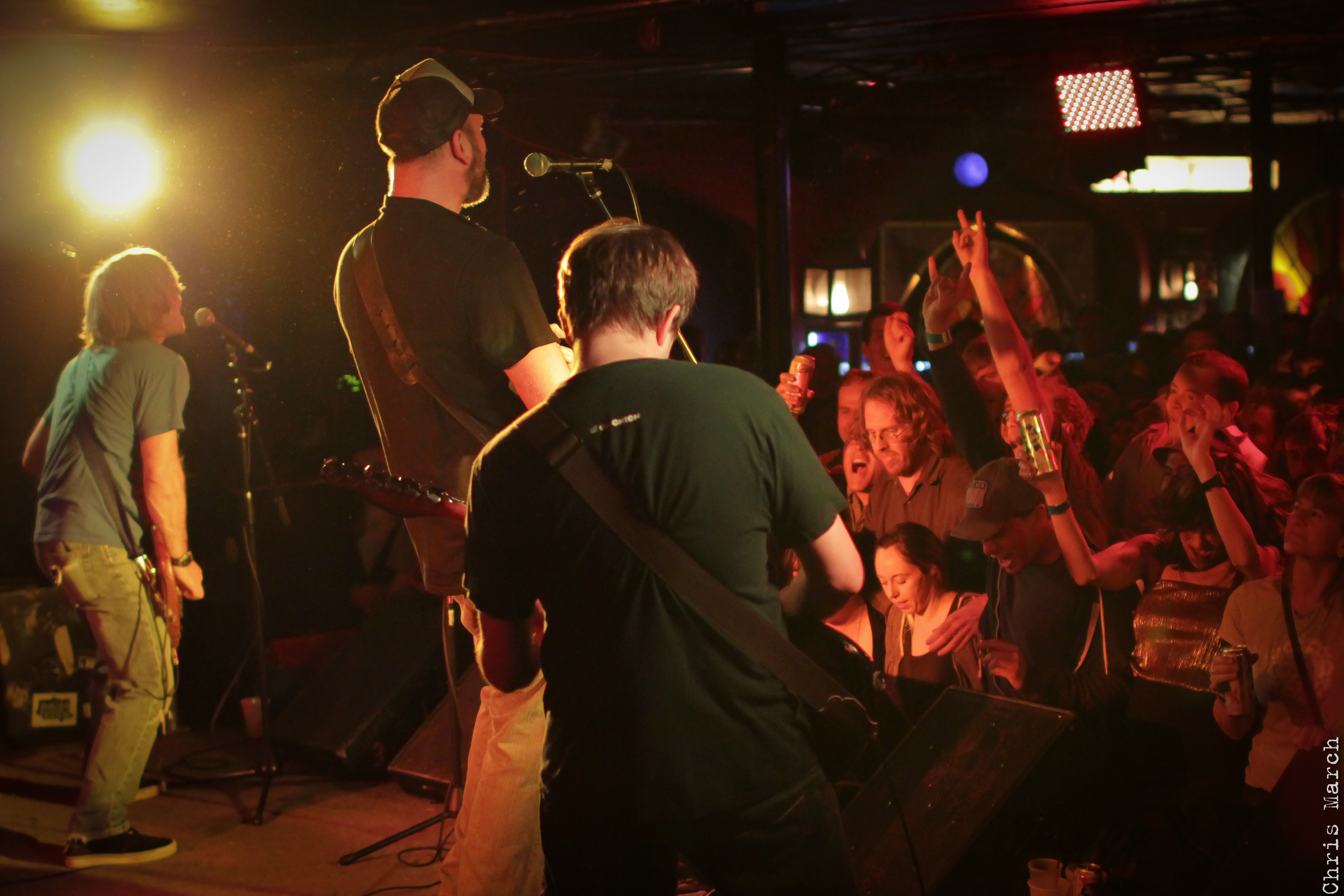
A 2012 performance by Archers of Loaf at The Middle East

- Charlie's Kitchen, which serves burgers, "double lobster rolls", frappes, and beer; considered one of the last vestiges of the "old" 1950s-era Harvard Square.
- Club Passim; primarily a folk music club, but it also serves food during shows.
- Grendel's Den, also a bar.
- The Middle East, a nightclub and music venue, as well as a Lebanese restaurant.
- The Plough and Stars, another bar and music venue.
- Toscanini's, an ice cream restaurant recognized as the Best of Boston by Boston Magazine several times.
- Upstairs On the Square
- Veggie Galaxy
- Yume Wo Katare

=== Former restaurants ===
- Café Pamplona, open from 1959 to 2020.
- Rialto, open from 1994 to 2016.
- Tasty Sandwich Shop, a diner open from 1916 to 1997.

== See also ==
- List of Michelin-starred restaurants in American Northeast Cities
- List of restaurants in Boston, for other nearby restaurants
