= Amrheins Restaurant =

Coordinates: 41.48032°N 71.30911°W

- The bar at Amrheins Restaurant
- Interactive map of Amrheins Restaurant

Restaurant information
- Location: Boston, Massachusetts, United States

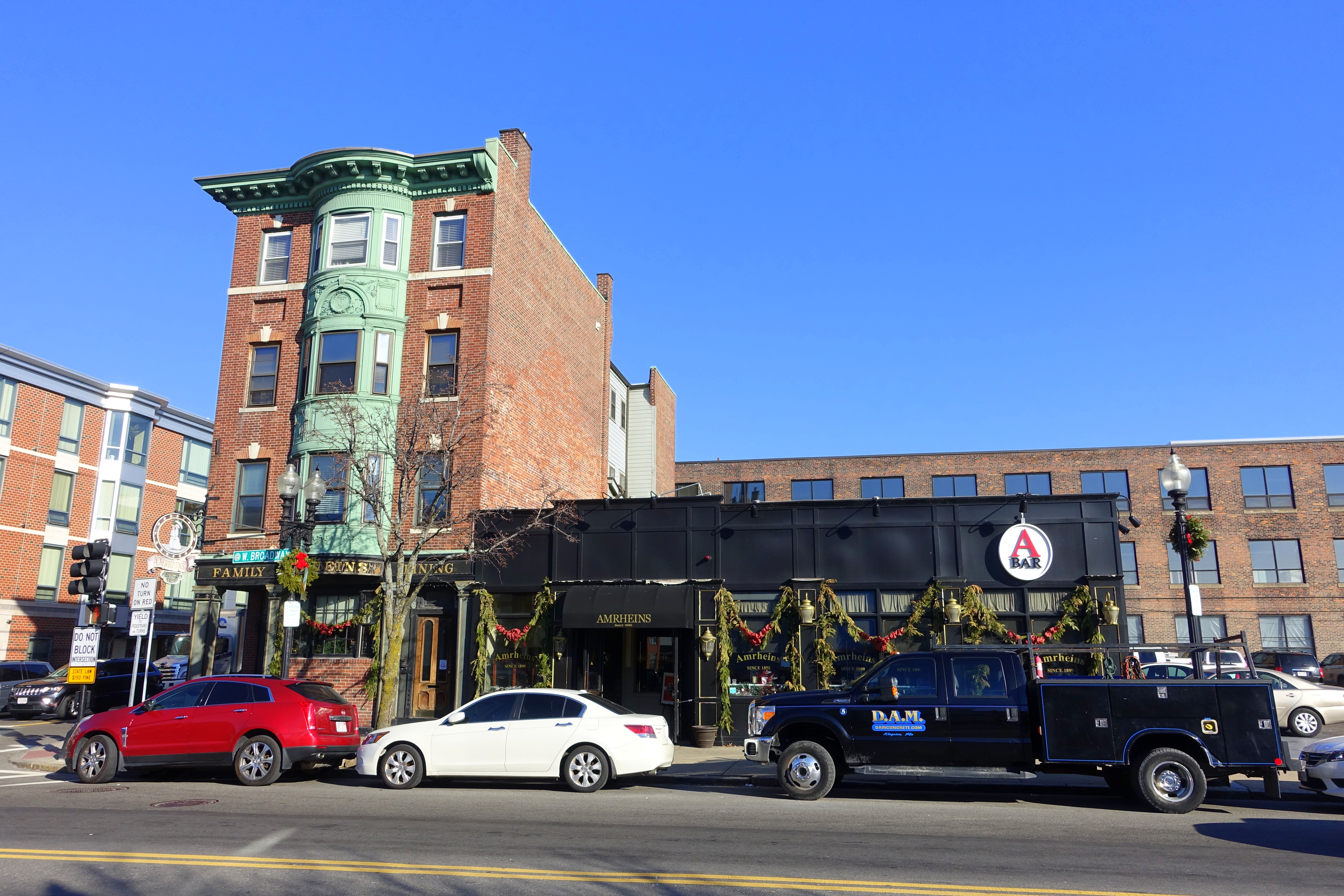
Amrheins Restaurant in December 2018

Amrheins, open since 1890, is the oldest bar in South Boston. They also have the first draft beer pump in Boston and the oldest hand carved bar in America is on display. In January 2019, it was announced there was an agreement for sale for $18 million. They had been on the market at least since the summer of 2018.

In 2005, they closed for repairs and they closed again in 2016 for renovations.
