= Mantra (restaurant) =

Coordinates: 42°21′18″N 71°3′42″W

- Interactive map of Mantra

Restaurant information
- Established: 2001
- Food type: French–Indian Fusion cuisine
- Location: Boston, Massachusetts, United States

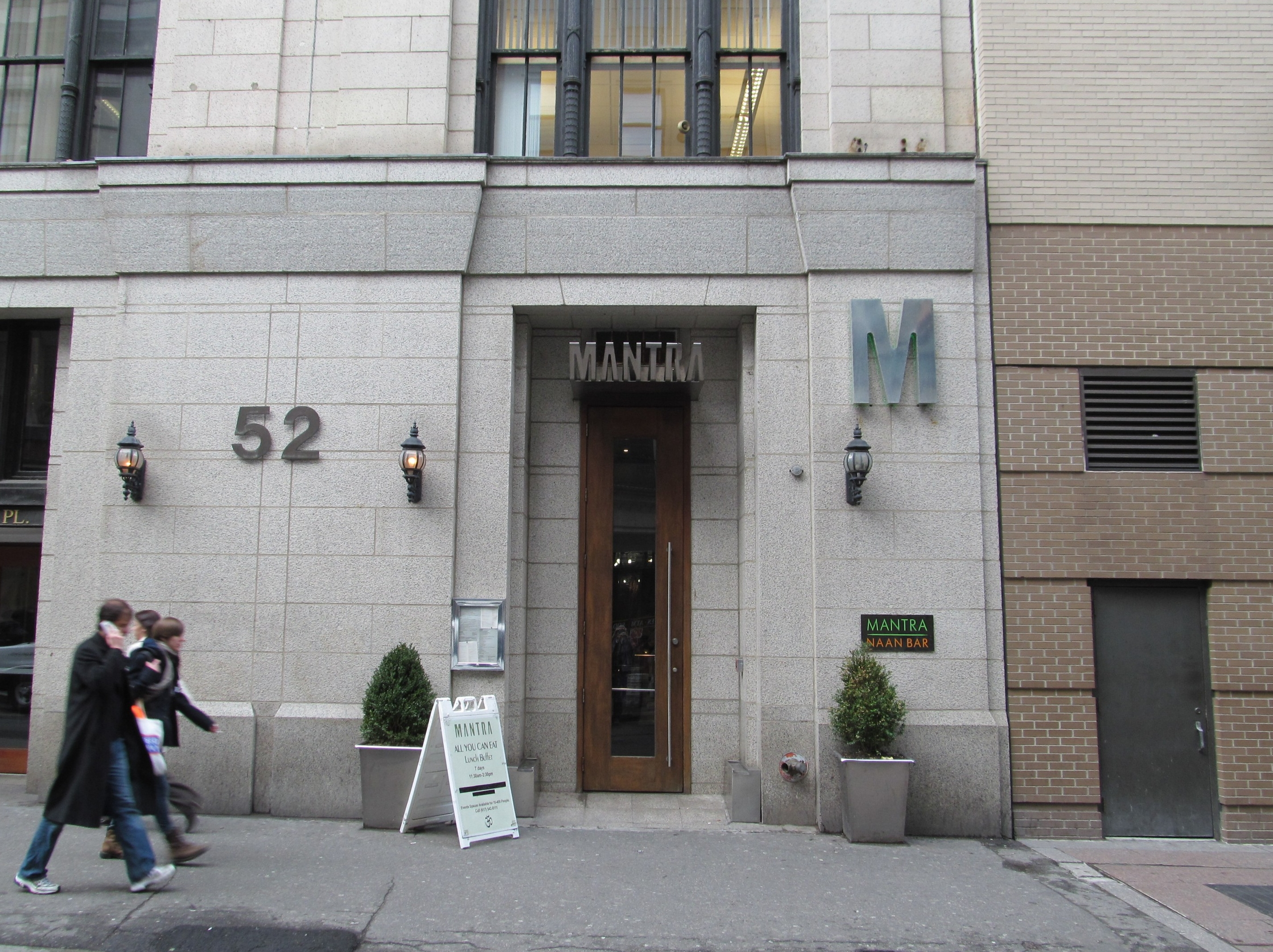
Mantra Restaurant

Mantra was a French–Indian Fusion cuisine restaurant located in Temple Place of the Ladder District of Boston, Massachusetts designed by Monica Ponce de Leon and Nader Tehrani. It was cited as a factor in the transformation of the Ladder District into a more appealing part of the city of Boston. The restaurant featured an avant-garde style design. The food served was compared to Nouvelle cuisine. The restaurant also featured a hookah bar. They began selling high-end Voss bottled water after opening in 2001. Voss was a new brand at that time and Mantra offered it in part to draw attention to their unusual selections.

The dining room was located in what was previously the lobby of a bank. The restaurant retained some aspects of the bank's decor with a high ceiling and a marble bar. The restaurant's restrooms drew attention due to their unconventional design. The stalls used One-way mirrors as doors and the urinals were located in the center of the room and were filled with ice.

Although it was initially slated to open in January 2001, Mantra did not open until June of that year. It initially featured an Indian chef who had worked in French, Mediterranean and Indian style restaurants. The owners of Mantra had previously owned several traditional style Indian restaurants in Boston.

In April 2012, parent company One World Cuisine announced that it would be closing Mantra, along with the company's flagship restaurant Café of India in Harvard Square. In July 2013, the property was sold at foreclosure auction for $1.7 million to Amir Youshaei, owner of Paz Jewelry.
