= The Fours =

Sports bar

Coordinates: 42°21′55.19″N 71°03′39.01″W

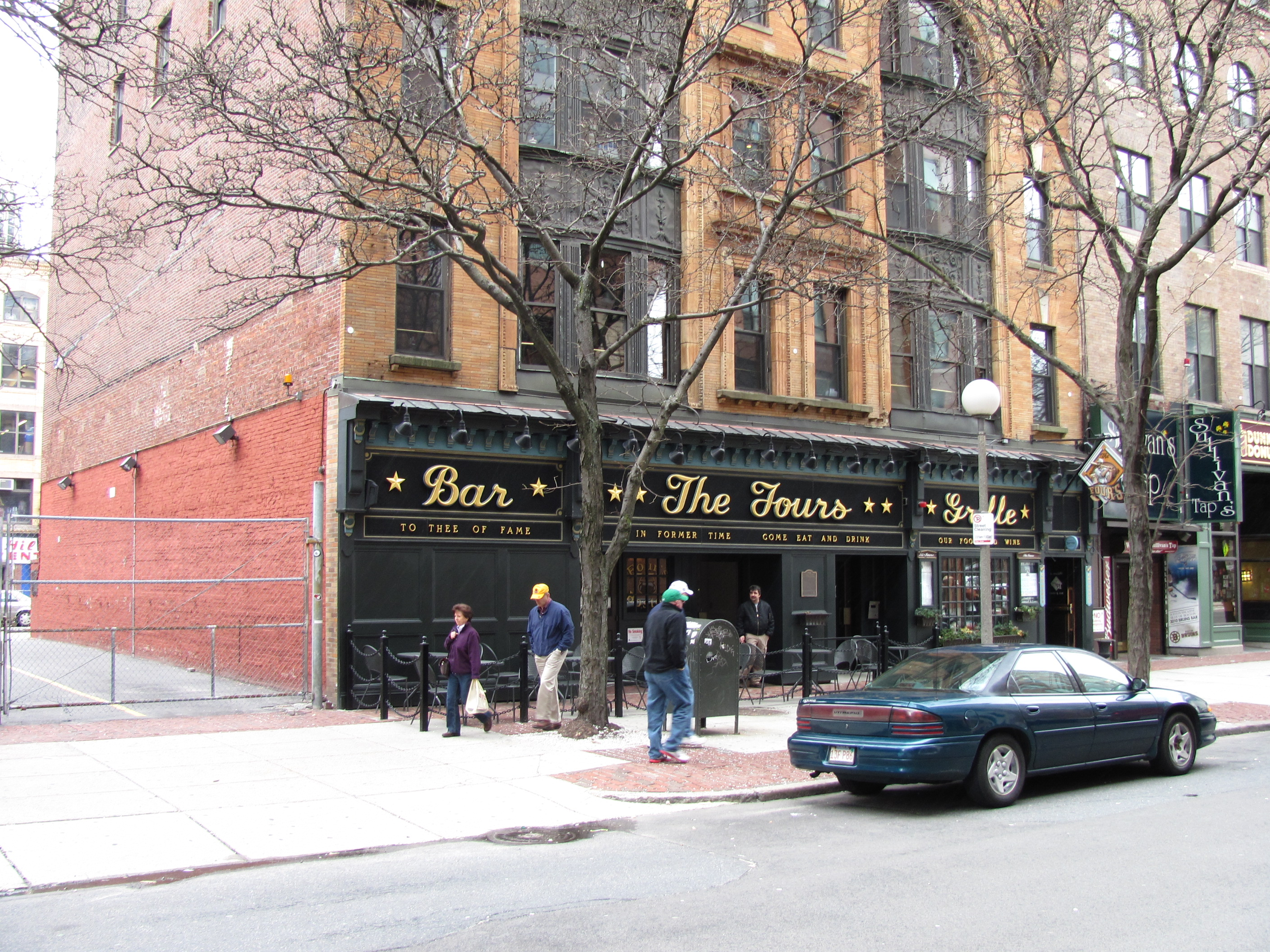
- The Fours on Canal Street in Boston
- Interactive map of The Fours

Restaurant information
- Location: Massachusetts, United States

The Fours is a sports bar with locations in Quincy and Norwell, Massachusetts. The now-closed Boston location was voted the best sports bar in the United States by Sports Illustrated in 2005. It was established in 1976. It was noted to be a rare late-night option for the South Shore by the Boston Globe in 2009.
