= Bokor, Cambodia =

Bokor បូកគោ
- City
- Bokor City; ក្រុងបូកគោ
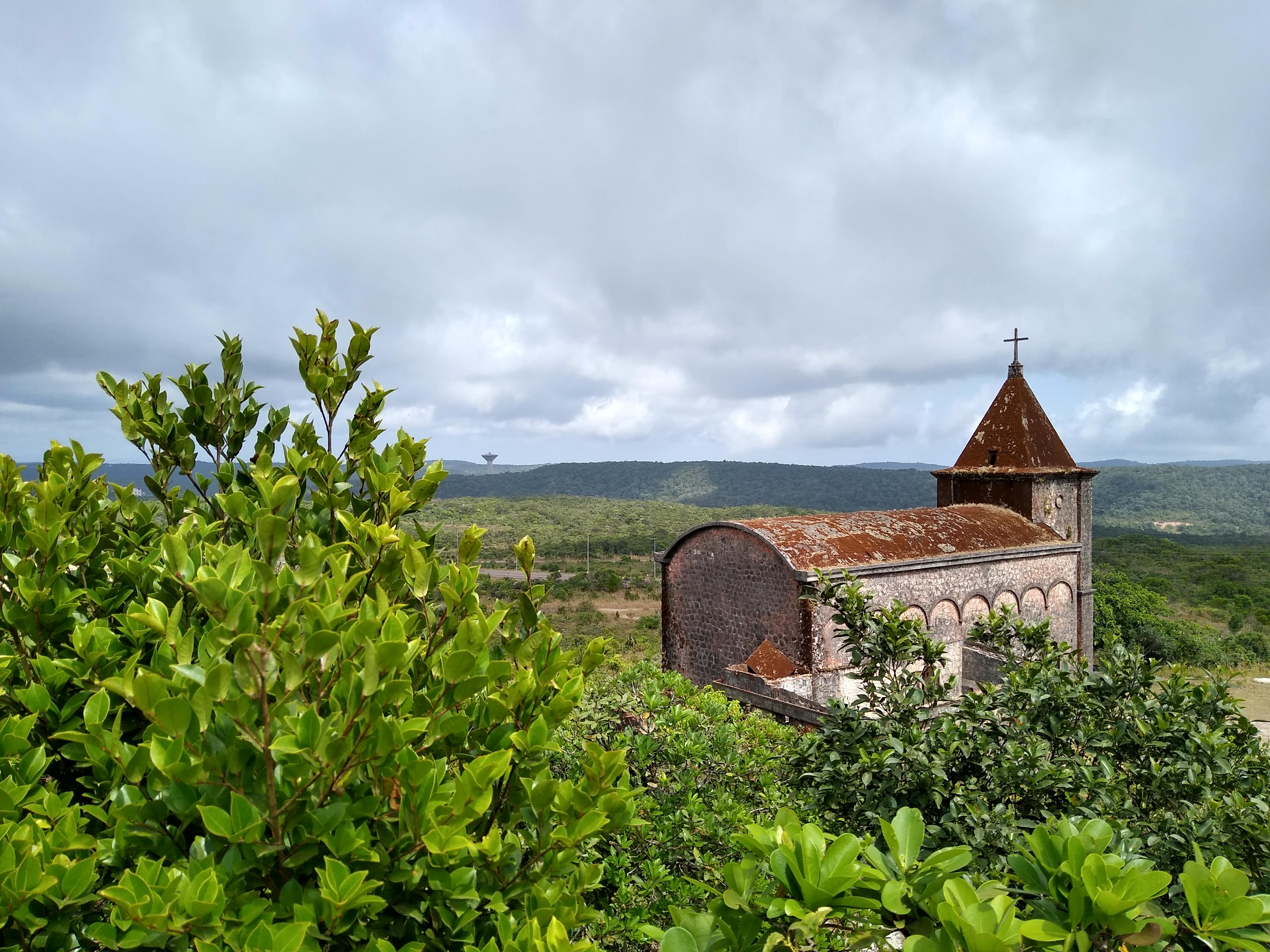
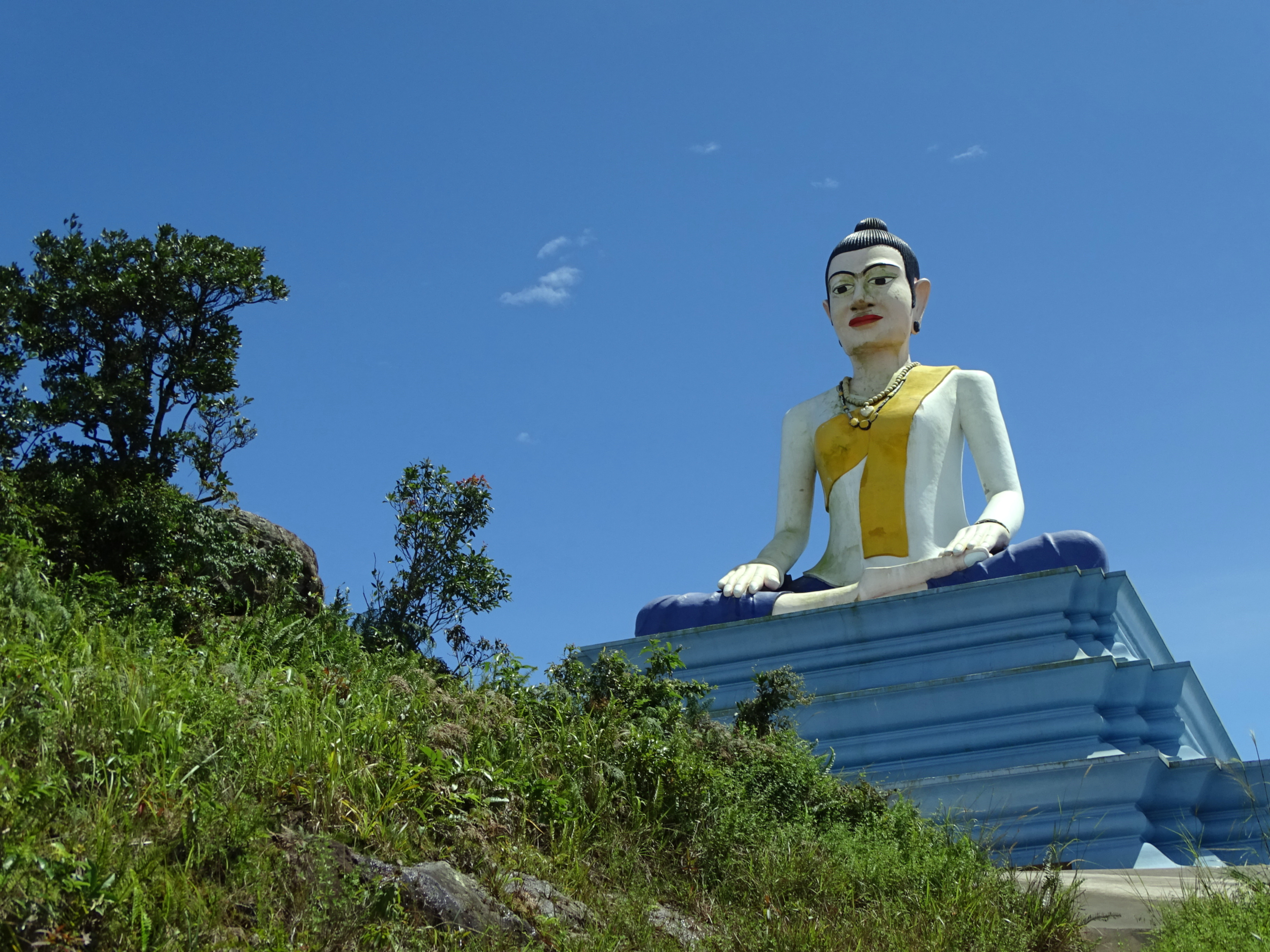
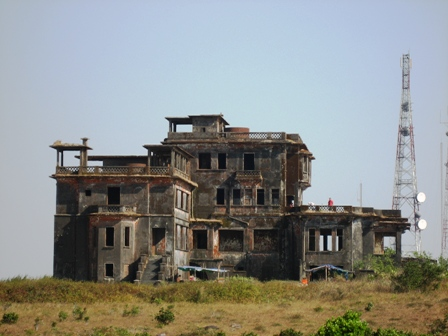
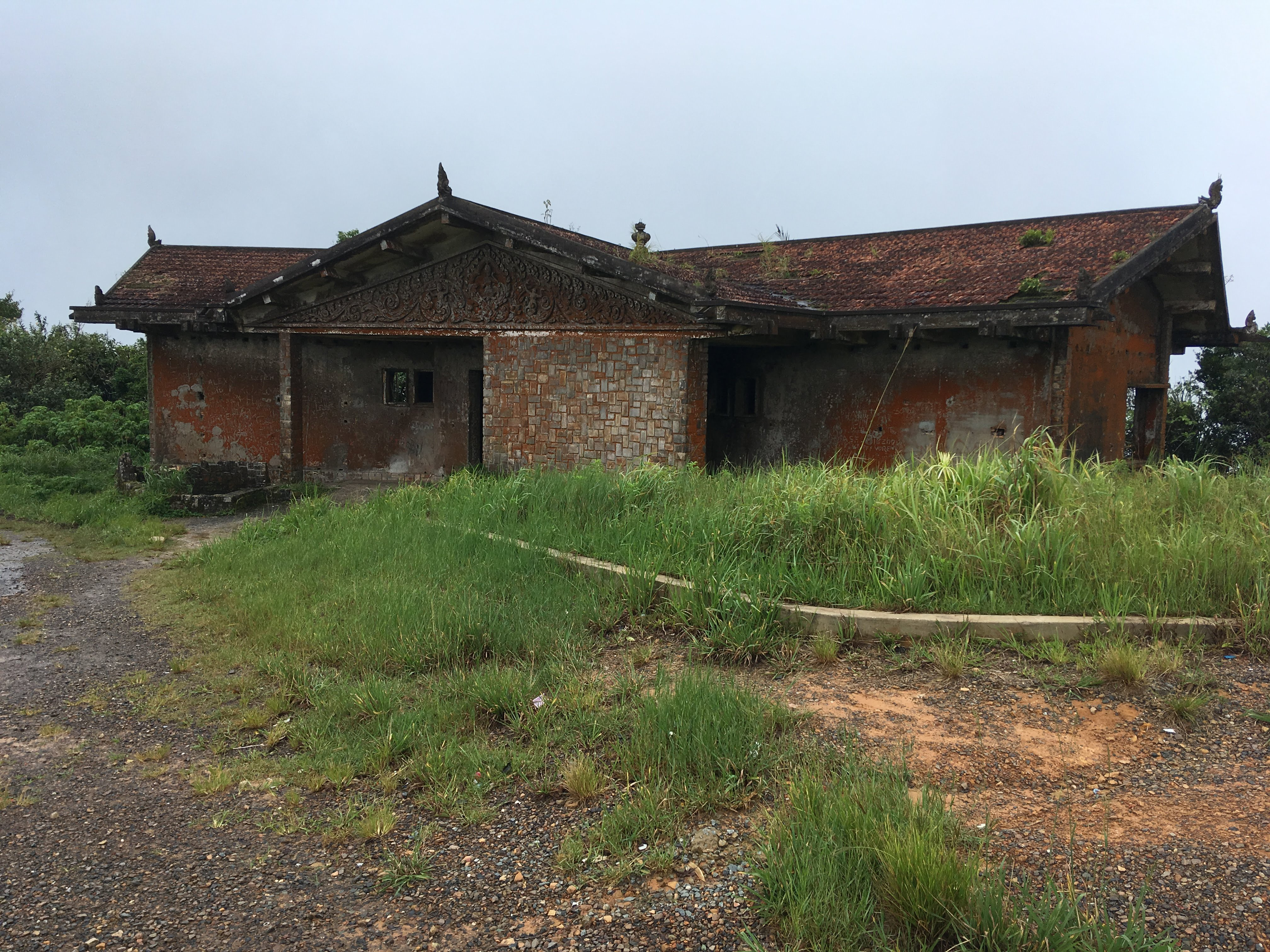
- Interactive map of Bokor
- Country: Cambodia
- Province: Kampot
- Municipality: Bokor
- Tourist Town: January 1962
- Administrative Town: 16 March 2021

Government
  - Type: City municipality
  - Mayor: Ngin Phalroth (CPP)

Area
  - Land: 279 km^{2} (108 sq mi)
- Elevation: 1,081 m (3,547 ft)

Population (2021)
  - Total: 23,000
  - Rank: Unknown
- Time zone: UTC+7 (ICT)
- Postal code: 70900
- Website: https://kampot.gov.kh

Bokor (Khmer: ក្រុងបូកគោ, Krŏng Bokkoŭ Khmer pronunciation: [kroŋ bok kɔː]) is a city in southern Cambodia and also the newest city in Kampot. The city is a highland area located within Preah Monivong National Park (Elephant Mountain) in Kampot, Cambodia. It lies approximately 40 kilometers west of Kampot and overlooks the Gulf of Thailand.

== History ==
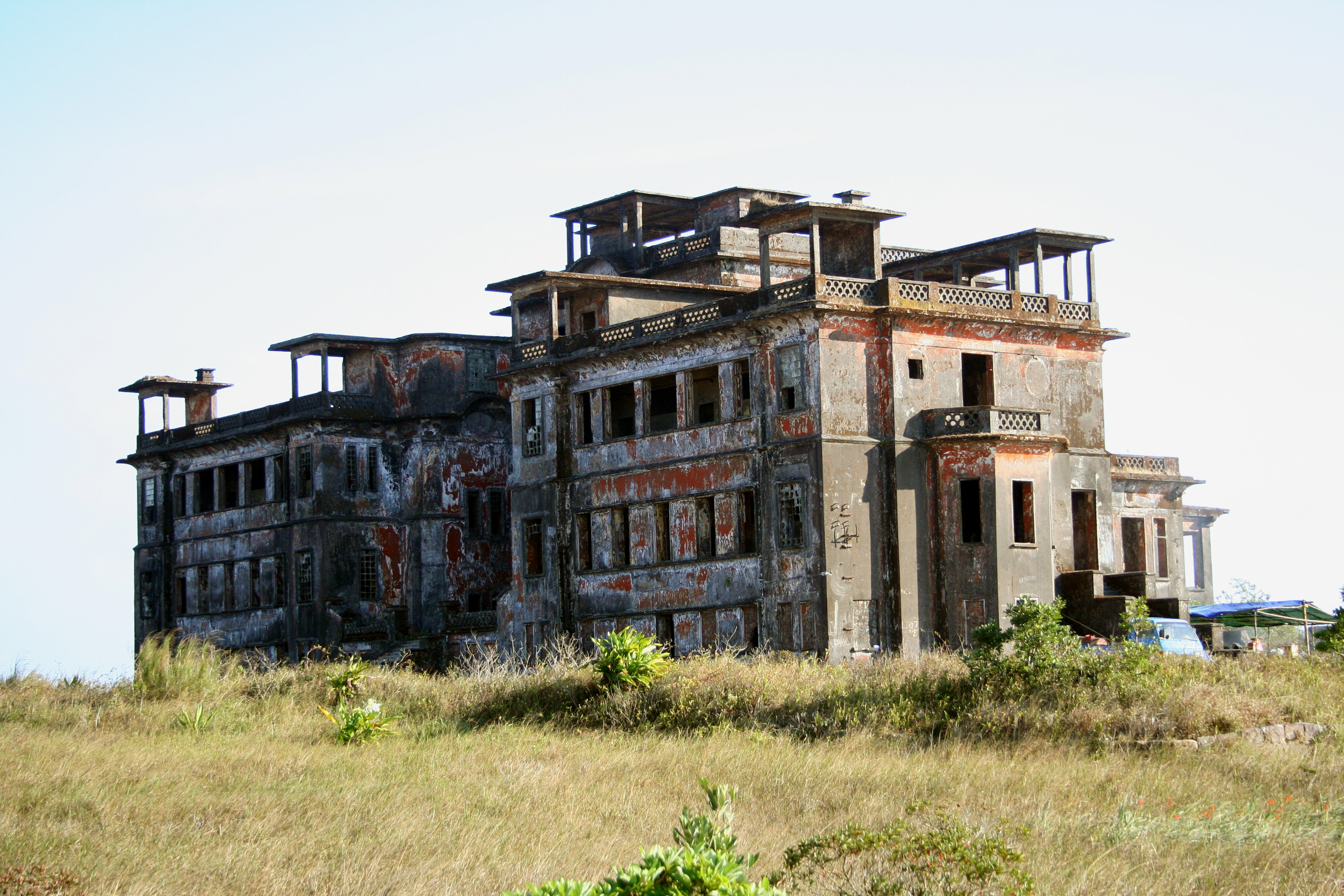
Le Bokor Palace, also known as Bokor Hill Station (2007)

The area of Bokor City, located on the plateau of Phnom Bokor (also known as Elephant Mountain or Dâmrei Mountain), was first developed as a hill station during the French colonial period in the early 20th century. The site was chosen for its cool climate and panoramic view of the Gulf of Thailand. The Le Bokor Palace, along with other colonial structures such as The Catholic Church, Post Office, Casino and Villas, was completed in 1925 to serve as a retreat for French officials and Cambodian elite. During the 1930s, The Cambodian monarchy constructed a summer resident known as The Black Palace (Damnak Sla Khmao) near the Yeay Mao Monument (nowadays) and the summit of the mountain. The hill station decline during the First Indochinese War in the 1940s and remained largely abandoned. In the 1960s, under the government of Prince Norodom Sihanouk, the area was brief revival with the construction of new hotels and casinos, and in 1962, It declare a tourist city. However, political instability and civil conflict let to further abandonment, and the area became a stronghold for the Khmer Rouge from the 1970s until the 1990s. In 1993, the Cambodian government designated the area as Preah Monivong Bokor National Park to protect its natural environment and historical structures. In recent years, the government have undertaken restoration and redeveloped projects, cluminating in the creation of the administrative entity "Bokor City" which incorporated three communes. The development of the city within the national park has generate both tourism opportunities and concerns about environmental conservation and heritage preservation.

== Geography ==
=== Topography ===
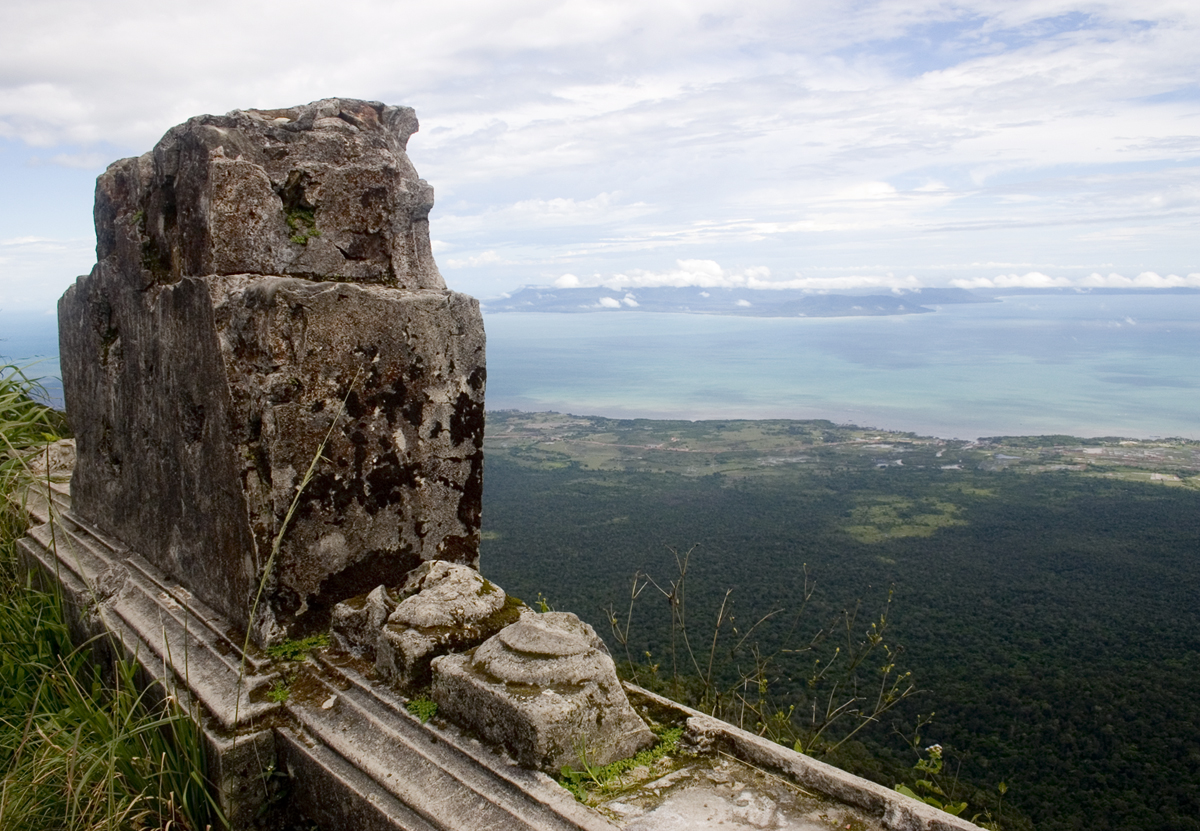

Bokor is situated on Elephant Mountains (Phnom Bokor), the area reaches an elevation of about 1,000 meters (3,280 ft) above the sea level. The terrain consists of steep forested slope rising from the coastal plains, leading to a cooler plateau characterized by grassland, evergreen forests and rocky escarpment. From the edge of the plateau, there are panoramic view of the coastline of Cambodia, the surrounding countryside and nearby island such as Phú Quốc.

=== Architecture ===
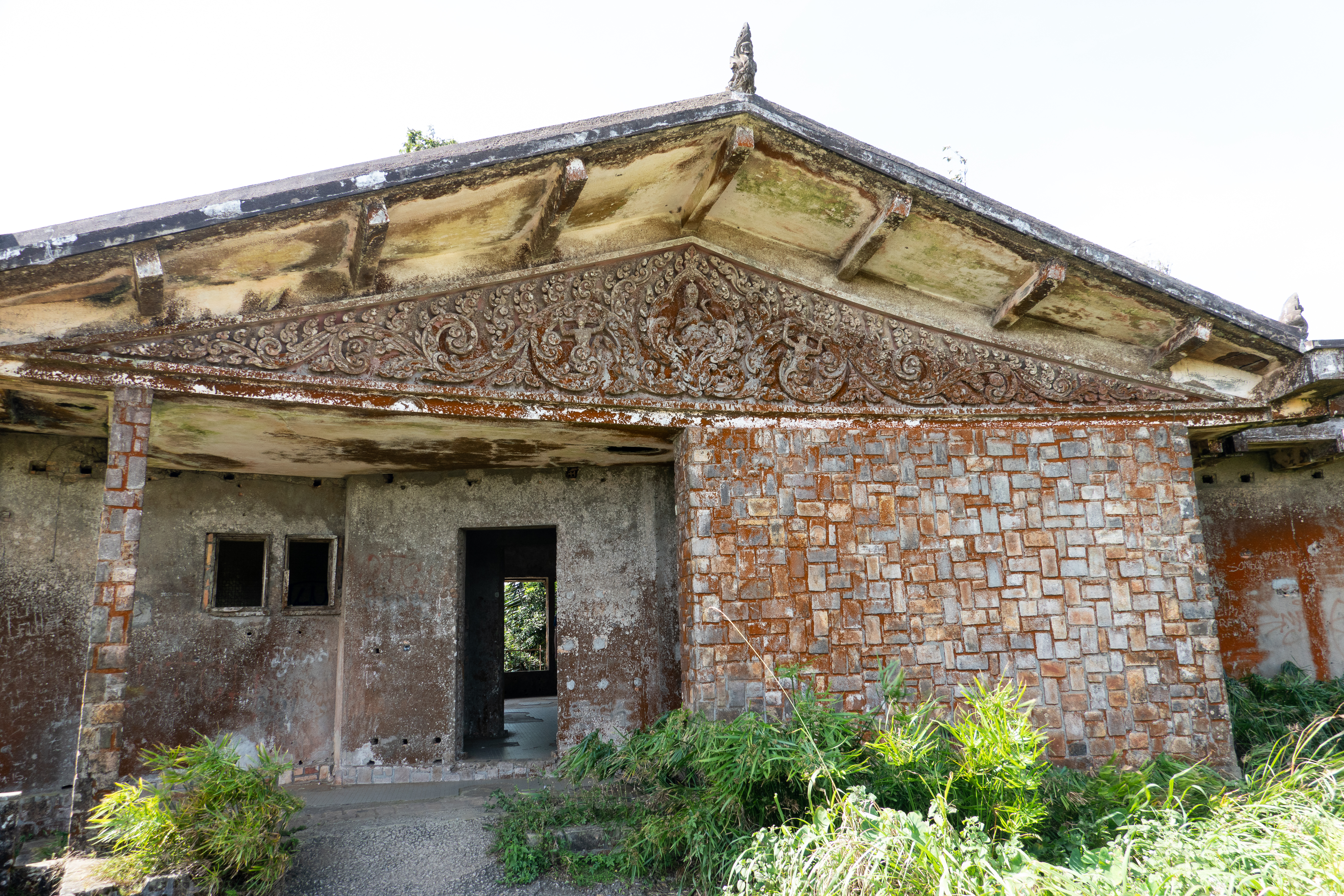
The Black Palace, design for Norodom Sihanouk's vacation villa

Bokor was originally developed in the 1920s as a French Colonial hill station, and several colonial-era structures still stands today such as the Bokor Hill Station, the Church of Mount Bokor, and various ruins scattered across the plateau.

=== Climate ===
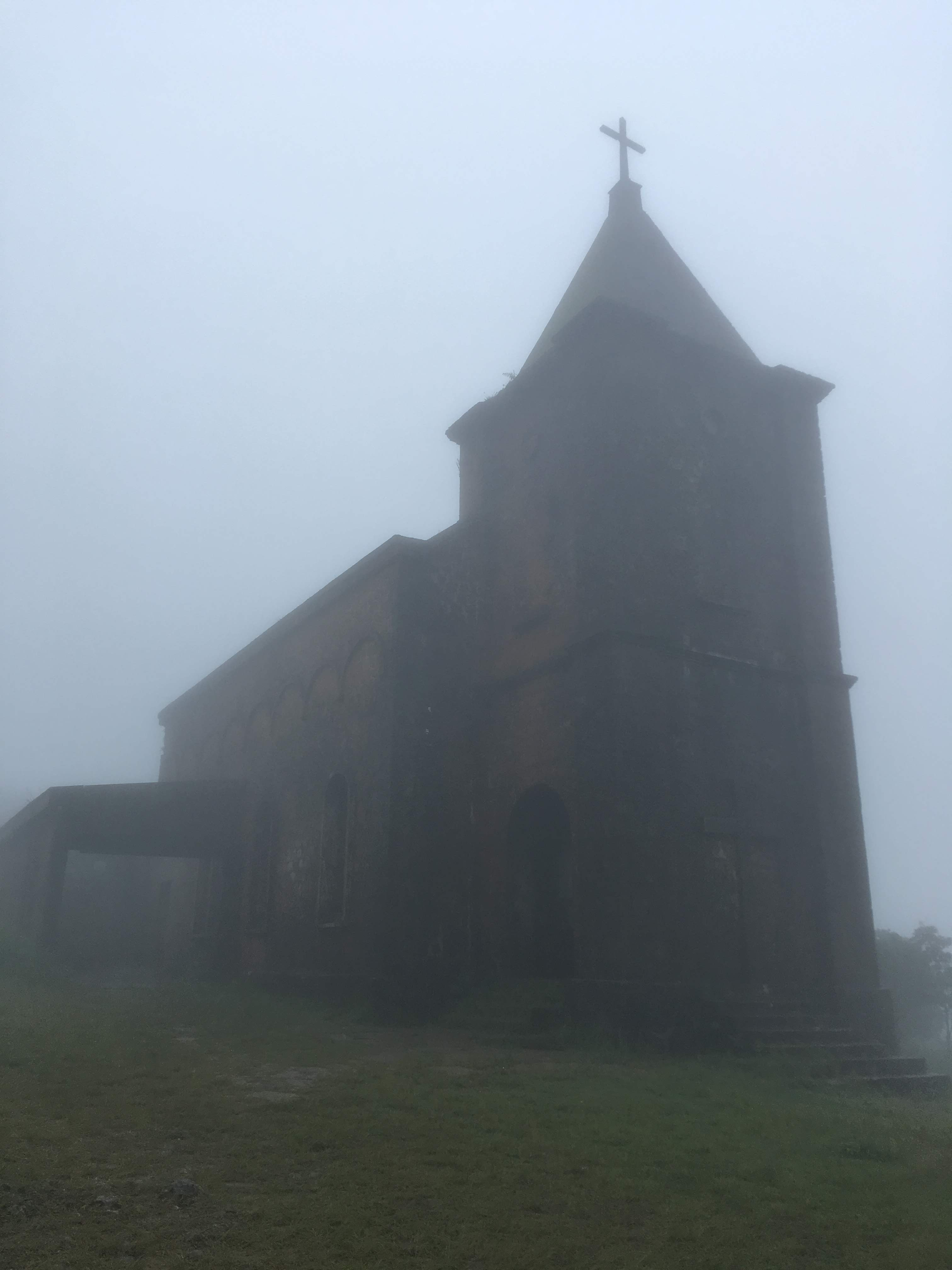

The climate is significantly cooler and more humid than the lowlands, often cover in fog and mist, particularly during the wet season from May to October, Several waterfall including Popokvil Waterfalls are located on the mountain

== Demographic ==
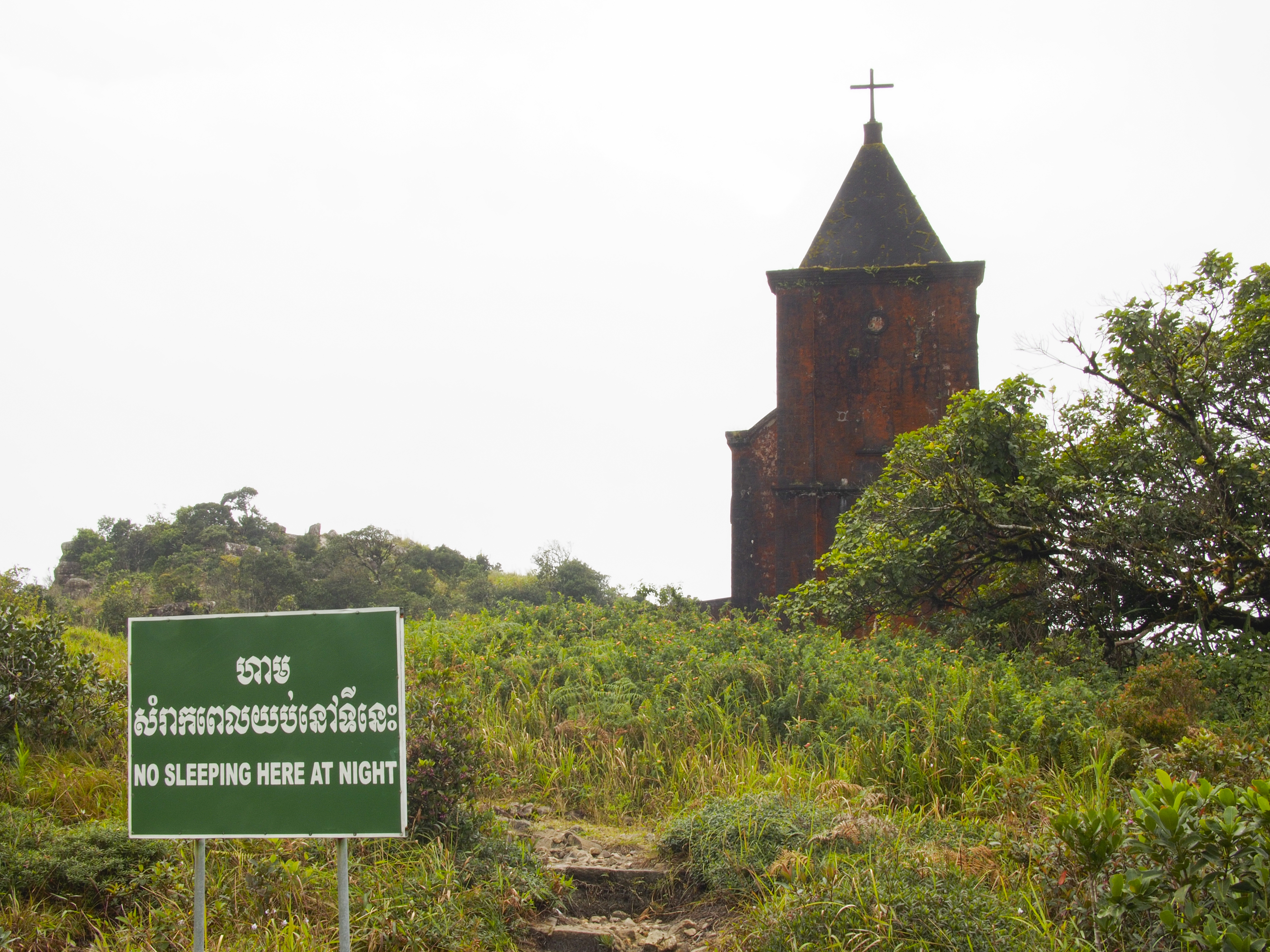
The Catholic Church

As of 2021, the population of Bokor is estimated at 23,000 people across the city, approximately 5,000 families.

== Administration ==
Bokor is formed from three communes (Sangkat), which are further subdivided into villages. These communes were separated from Tuek Chhou district to form the city.

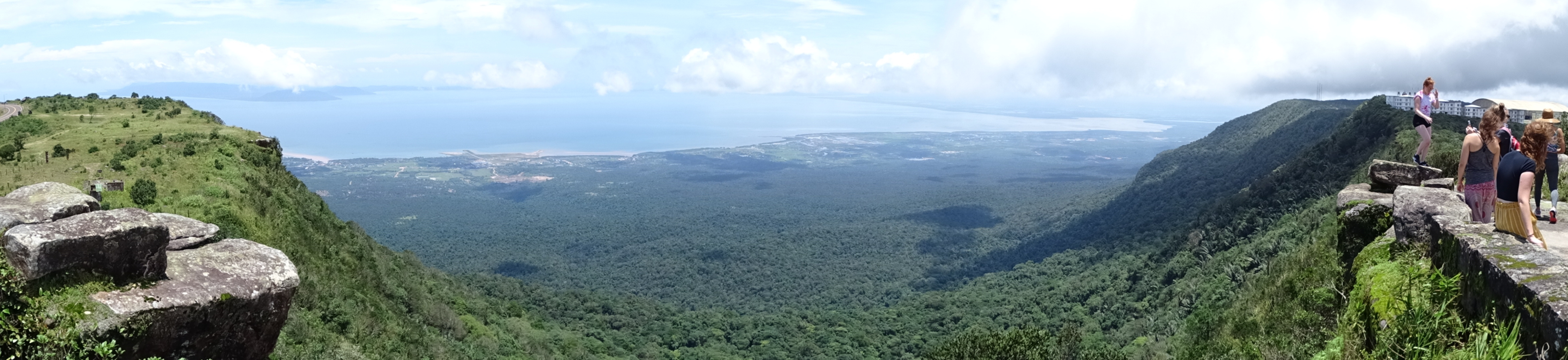
360° Panorama of Bokor City from Bokor Hill Station (view as a 360° interactive panorama)

The Communes of Bokor City
Postal Code	Commune	Romanization	Population	Sections
070901	សង្កាត់បឹងទូក	Sangkat Boeng Touk	5,674	3
070902	សង្កាត់កោះតូច	Sangkat Koah Touch	6,828	4
070903	សង្កាត់ព្រែកត្នោត	Sangkat Preak Tnoat	7,377	4

== Morden Development ==
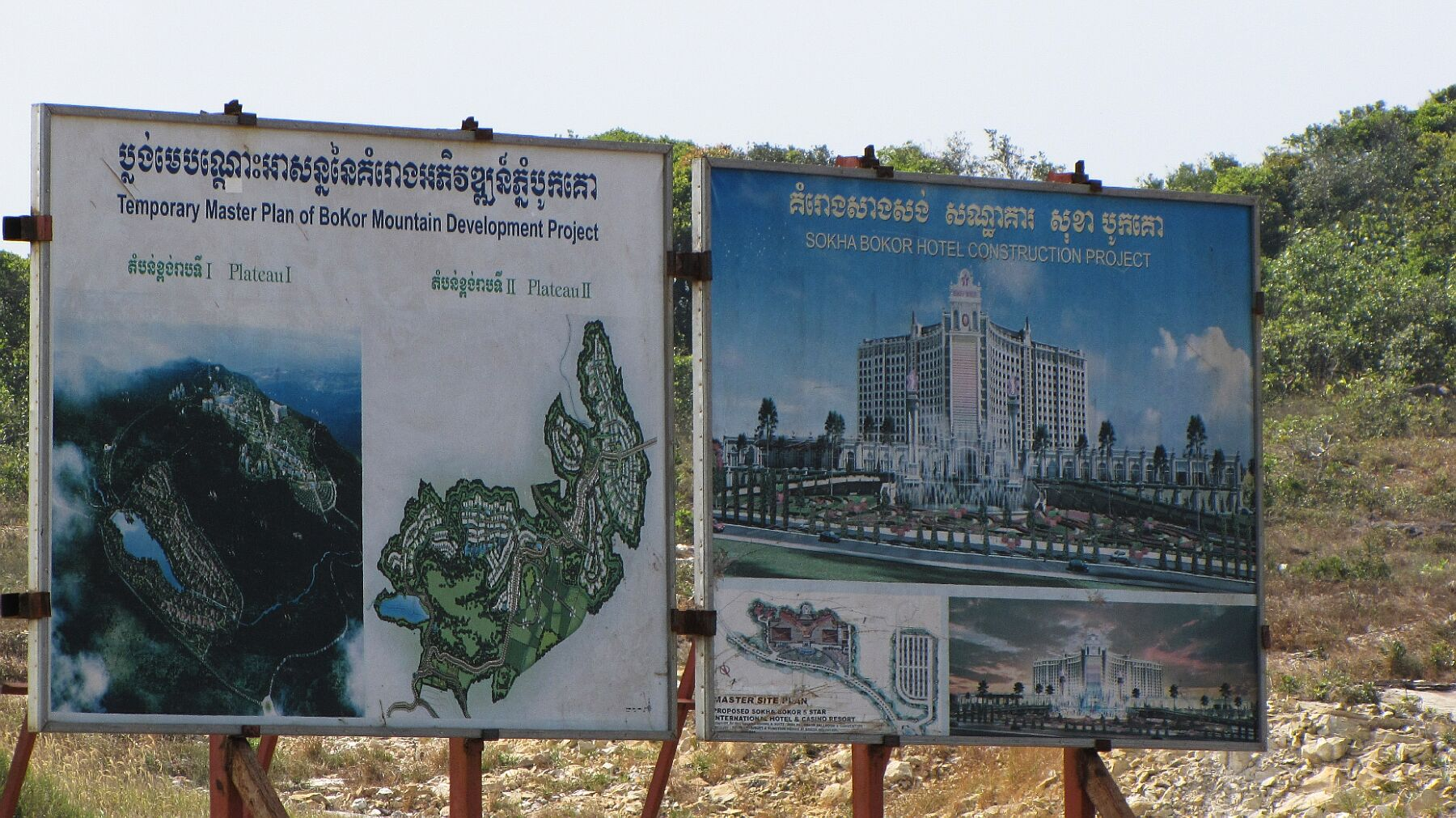
Bokor Master Plan

Since the late 2000s, Bokor has entered a new phase of development, transforming from a historic hill station to a large-scale resort and urban-development project. In 2019, the Cambodian government unveiled a master-plan to convert the Bokor Mountain plateau into a “smart and green city” by 2035, designating around 9,000 hectares for this purpose. Major private-sector investment has driven infrastructure and property development. The Sokha Hotel Group (Sokimex Group) and its parent company have invested hundreds of millions of dollars into roads, utilities, and residential estates. The newly constructed 61-kilometre road connecting the mountaintop region to National Highway 4 is one example of this infrastructure push. Residential projects such as Amret Thansur (over 80 ha), Morakot Thansur (88 ha, 1,300 villas) and Crown Estates (590 ha) demonstrate the scale of housing development. The modern development strategy integrates tourism, eco-residential zones, green spaces and public infrastructure. For example, the master plan includes physical infrastructure (roads, utilities), sewage and wastewater treatment systems, tourism zones, commercial zones and mixed-use areas. However, development has also generated concerns about environmental impacts. Activist groups have raised alarm over land clearing within the adjacent Preah Monivong Bokor National Park, and the demarcation of new city boundaries inside the protected area. In sum, Bokor City's modern development reflects Cambodia's ambition to create a high-end mountain resort city, but balancing rapid growth with environmental protection and financial sustainability remains a key challenge.

== Transportation ==
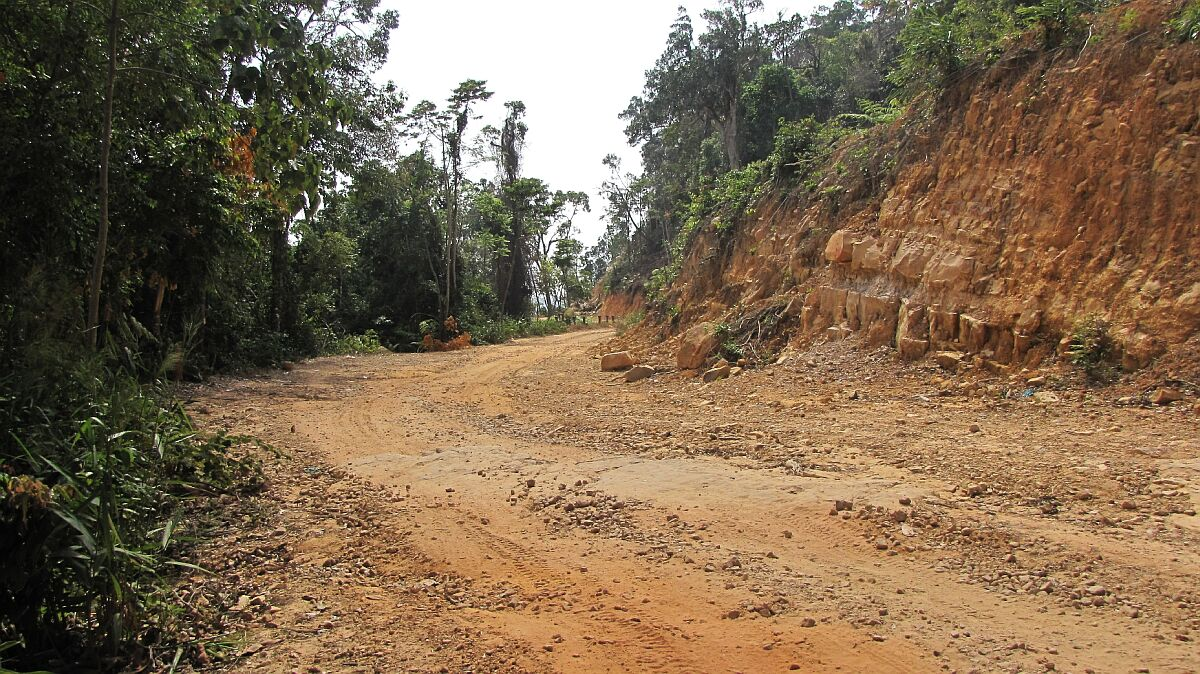
Bokor's National Road 32 under construction (2009)

Bokor is accessible mainly via the Bokor Mountain Road (National Road 32), a 32-kilometer scenic route that connects the plateau with National Road 3 near Kampot. The road was originally built during the French Colonial Period and was fully reconstructed and expanded by Sokimex Group (Sokha Group) in the early 2010s to support tourism and development. A new extension road linking Bokor City to National Road 4, serving as a secondary access route toward Phnom Penh and Sihanoukville, has also been under construction. This route shortens travel time between Bokor and Cambodia's coastal economic corridor. Public transportation to Bokor is limited, with most visitors using private vehicles or tour buses departing from Kampot, approximately 40 km away.

== Tourism ==
Bokor, perched atop the highland plateau of Phnom Bokor within Preah Monivong Bokor National Park in Kampot province, Cambodia, offers a unique blend of nature, history and resort-style luxury. The high elevation (over 1,000 metres) gives the area a cool-climate refuge and panoramic views of the Gulf of Thailand and the surrounding countryside. Key Attractions include the historic Le Bokor Palace Hotel and remaining French Colonial Architectures, which draw visitors interested in heritage and atmosphere. Natural landmarks such as the Popokvill Waterfall and viewpoint like Heaven Gate also make the site popular for nature, photos and tourism. Religion and spirituality play a part in the tourism offering too the mountain hosts ancient temples, a Catholic Church and a Shrines with a large Buddha statue under construction, which is set to become one of the tallest in Southeast Asia. The plateau is increasingly served by improved infrastructure. A rising luxury-resort component offers high-end accommodations while the sweeping mountain road remains part of the adventure for many travellers. At the same time, tourism development faces challenges environmental rights groups have flagged land-clearing and the conversion of protected-park land for housing and resort use.

== Gallery ==
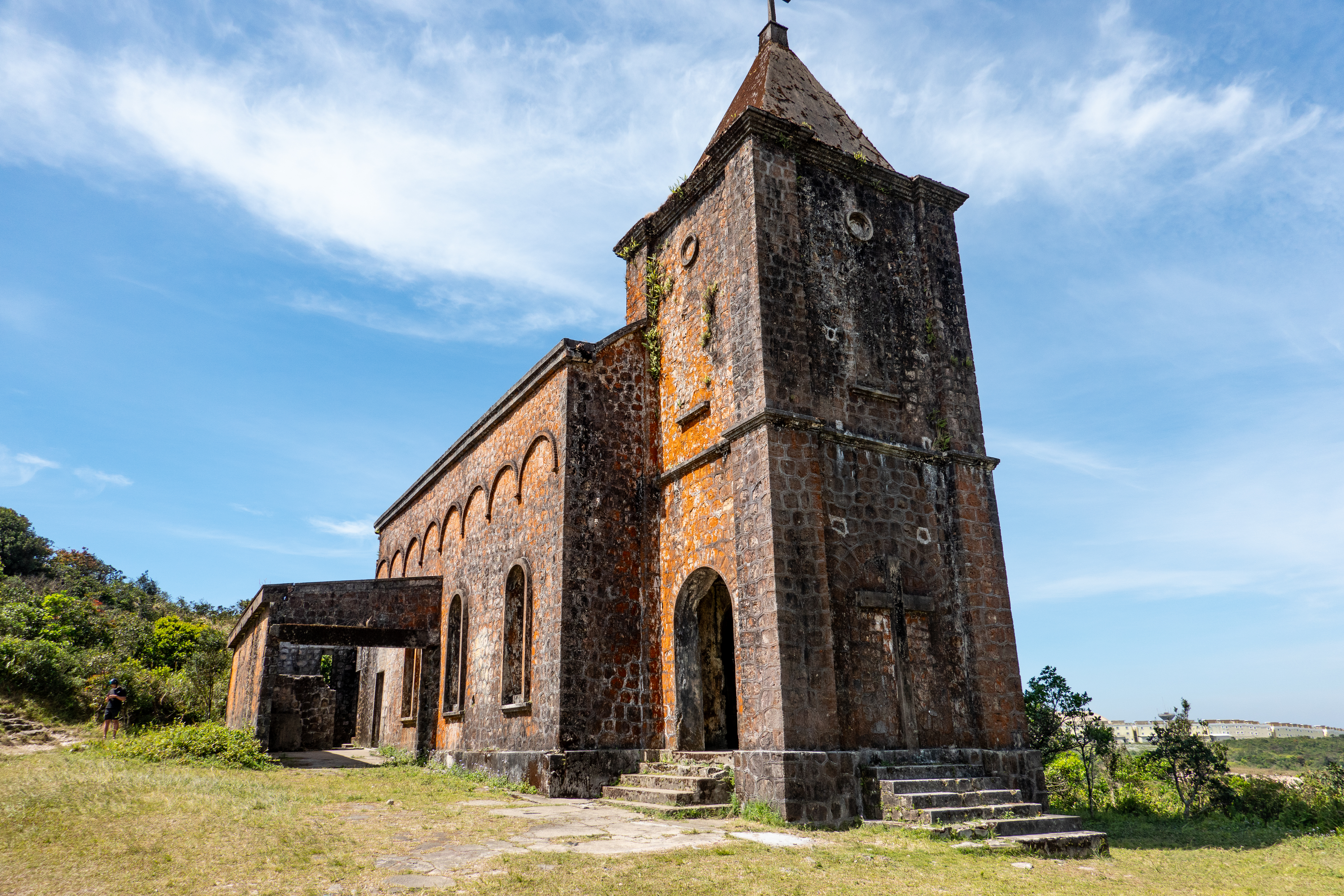
Abandoned Catholic Church

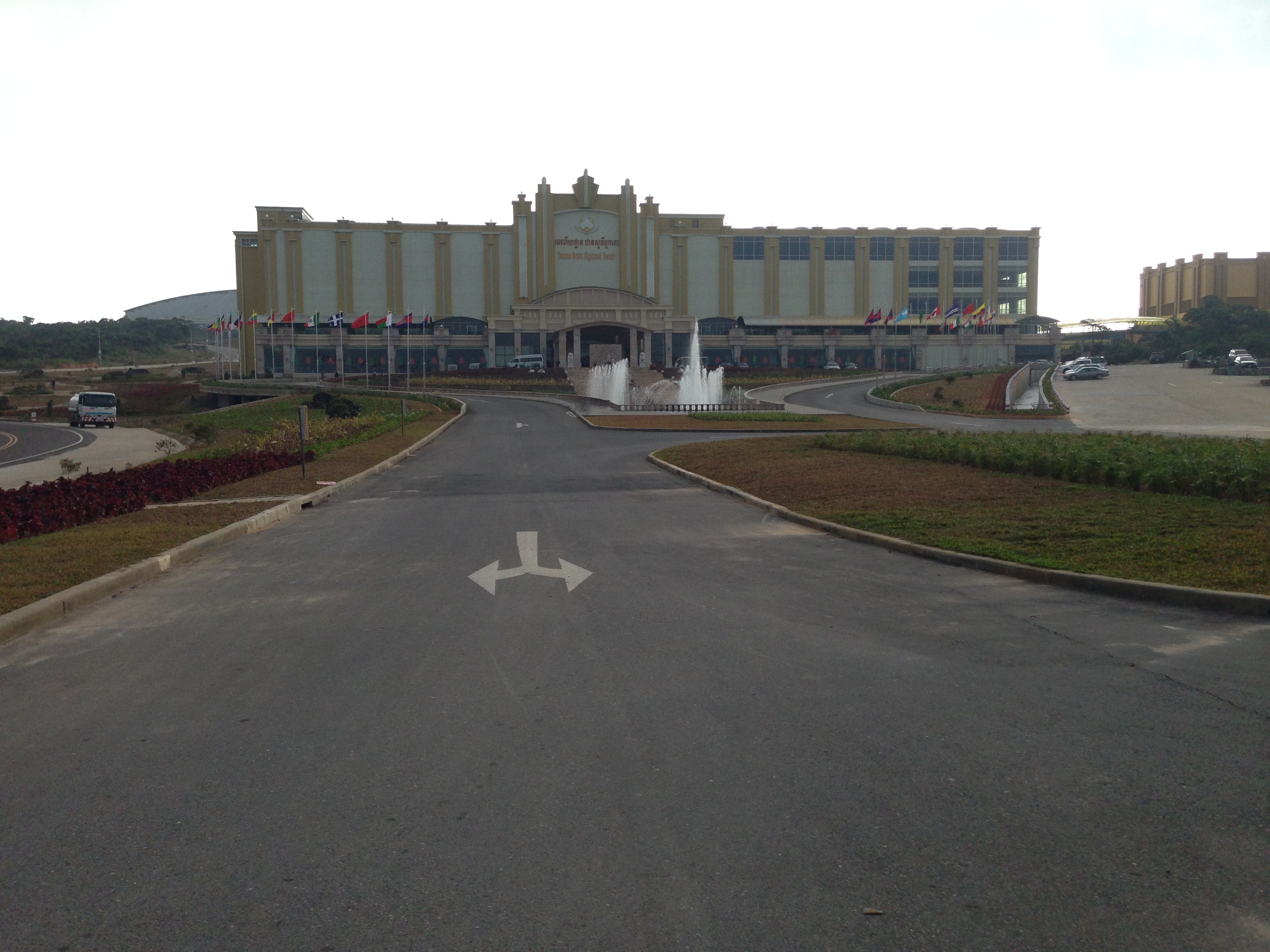
Thansur Bokor Highland Hotel

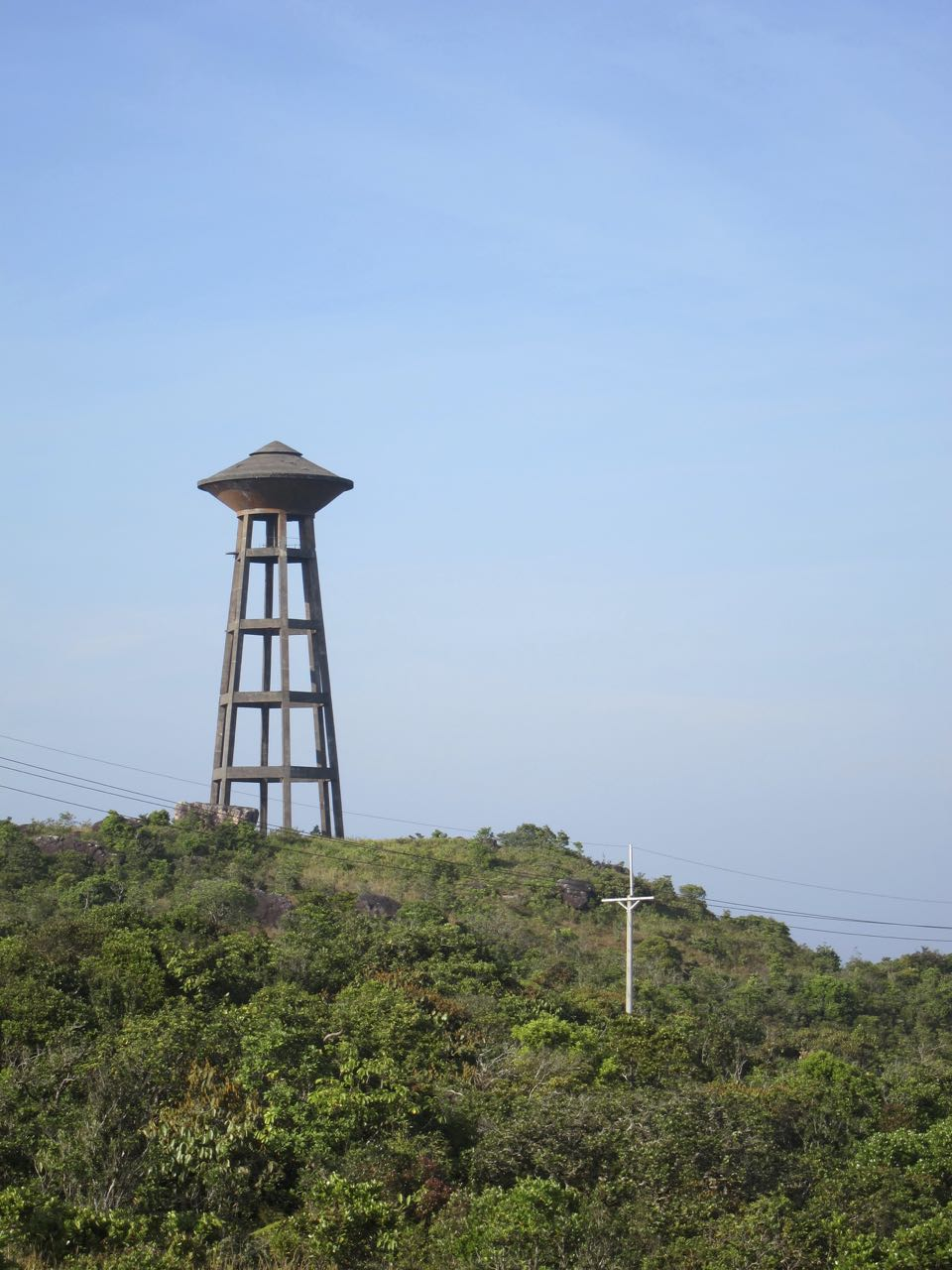
A Water Tank for supplying water resources

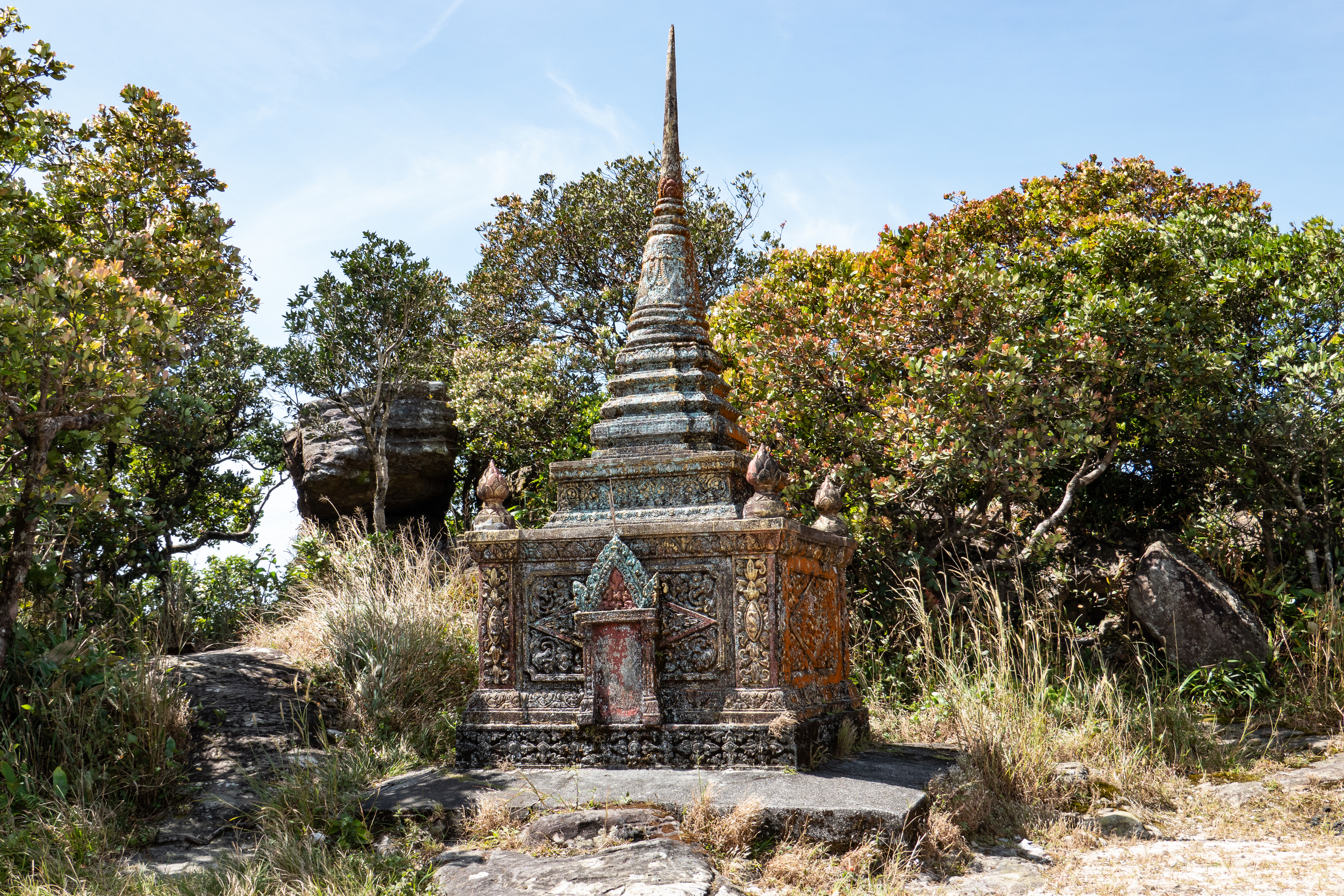
A Stupa in Wat Sompov Pram

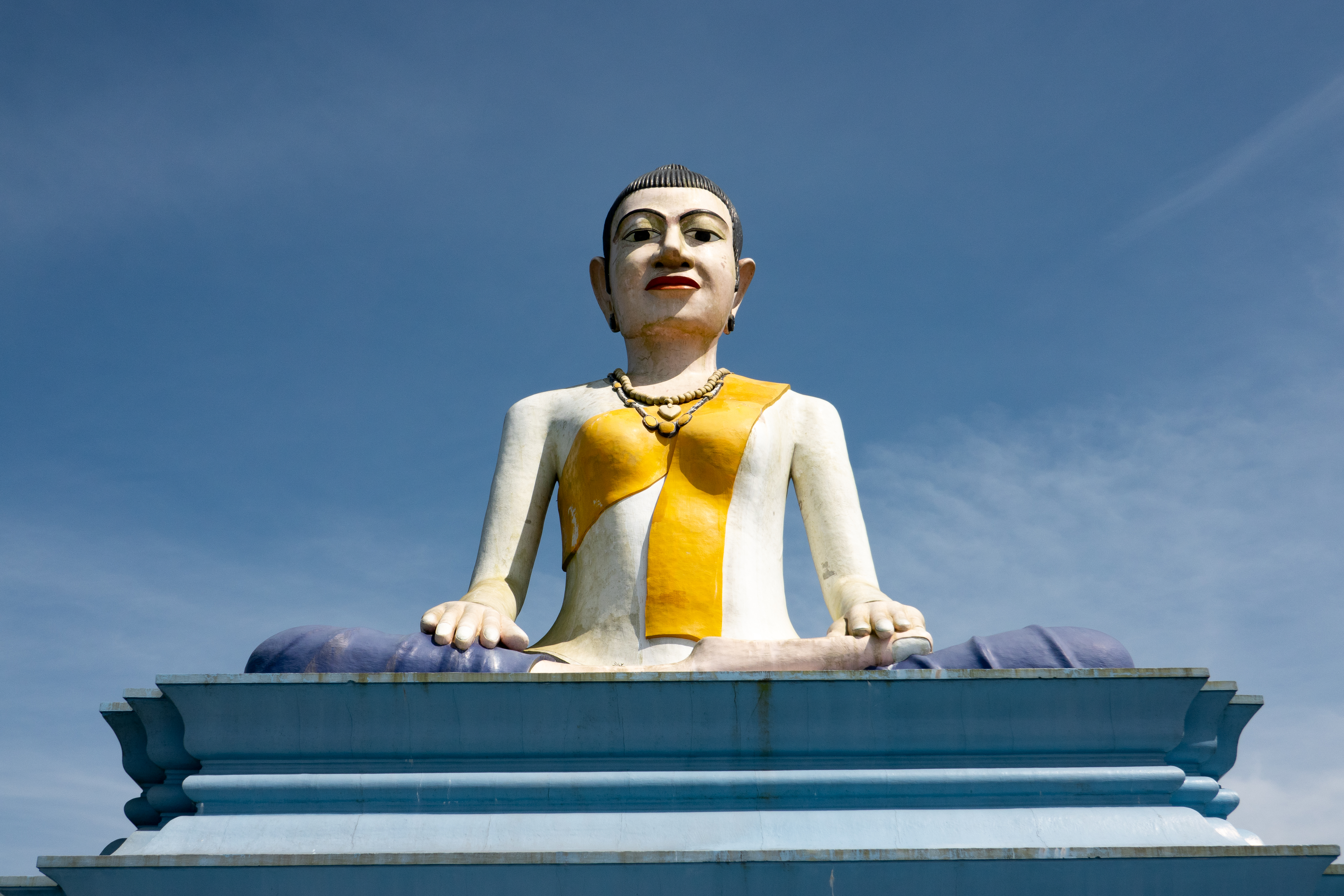
Grandmother Mao (Yeay Mao) Monument

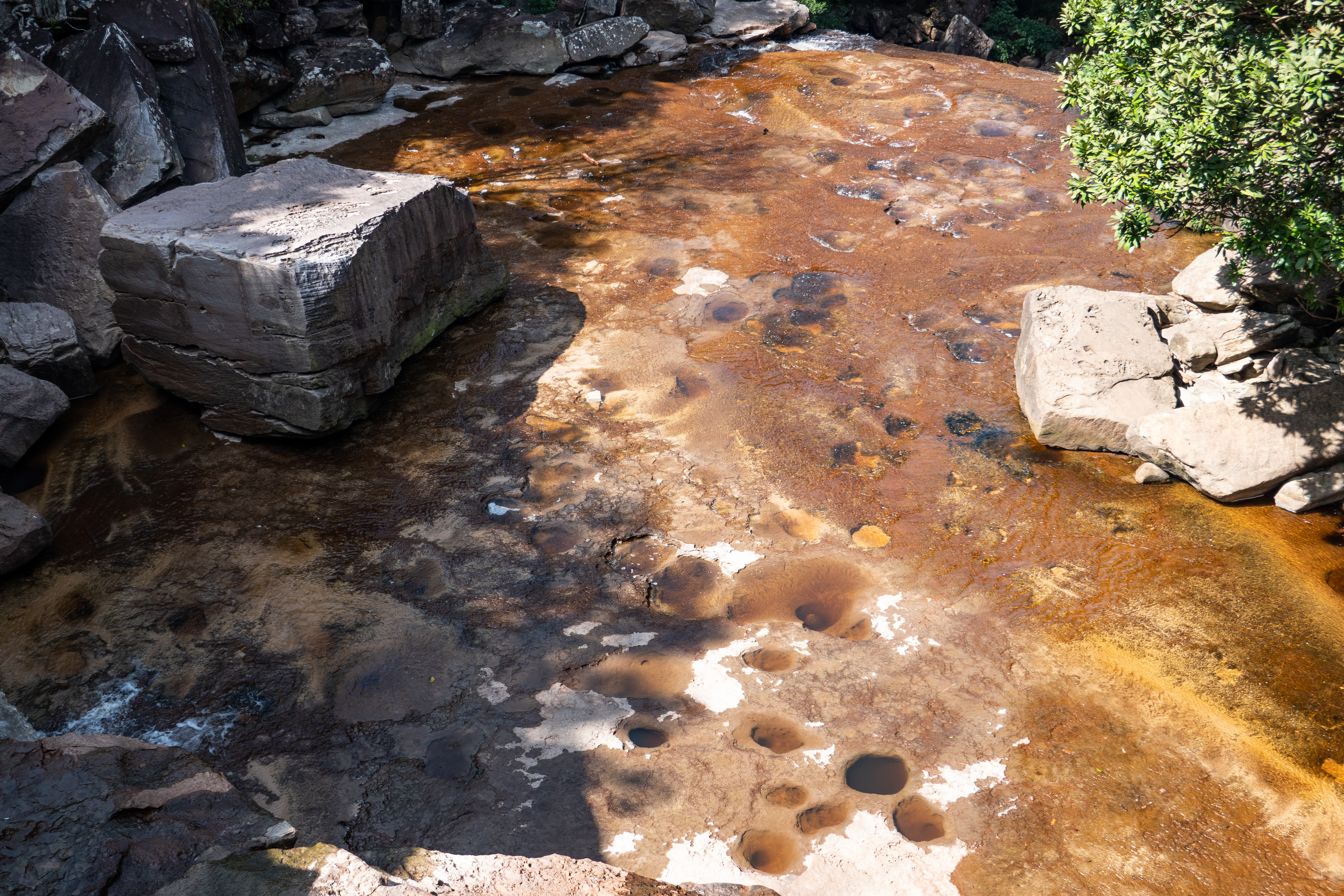
Popokvill Waterfall

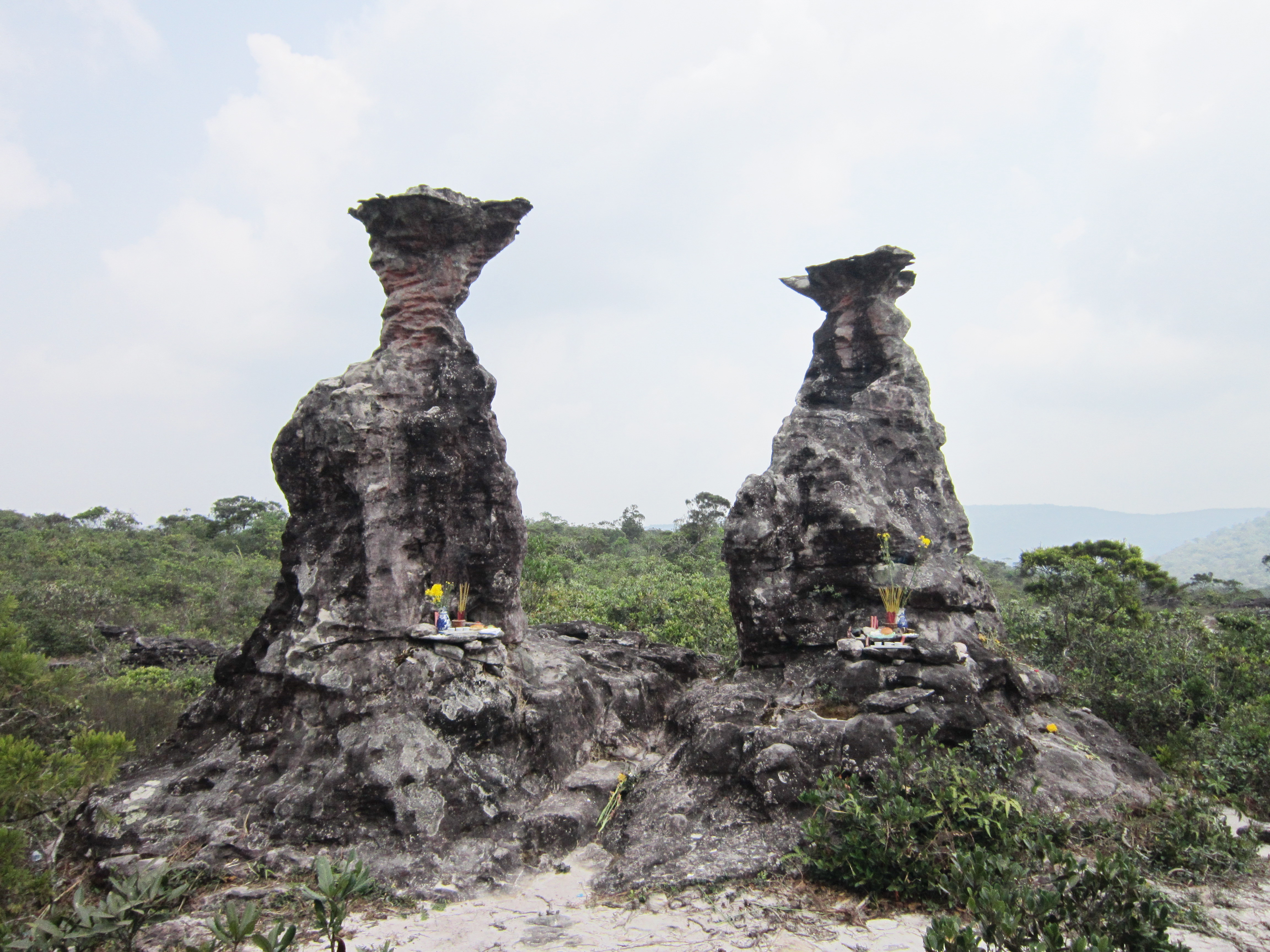
Heaven Gate

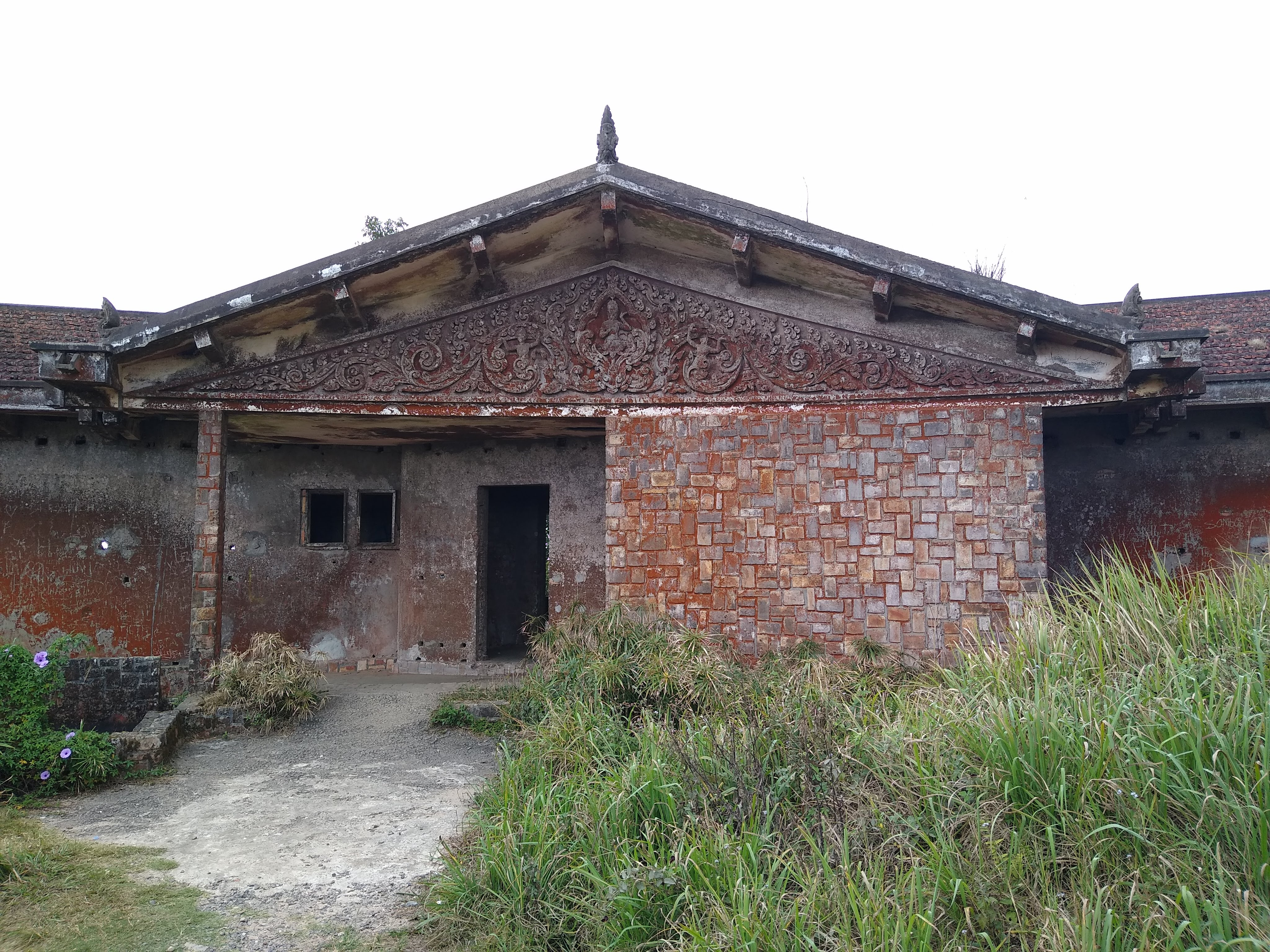
Black Palace

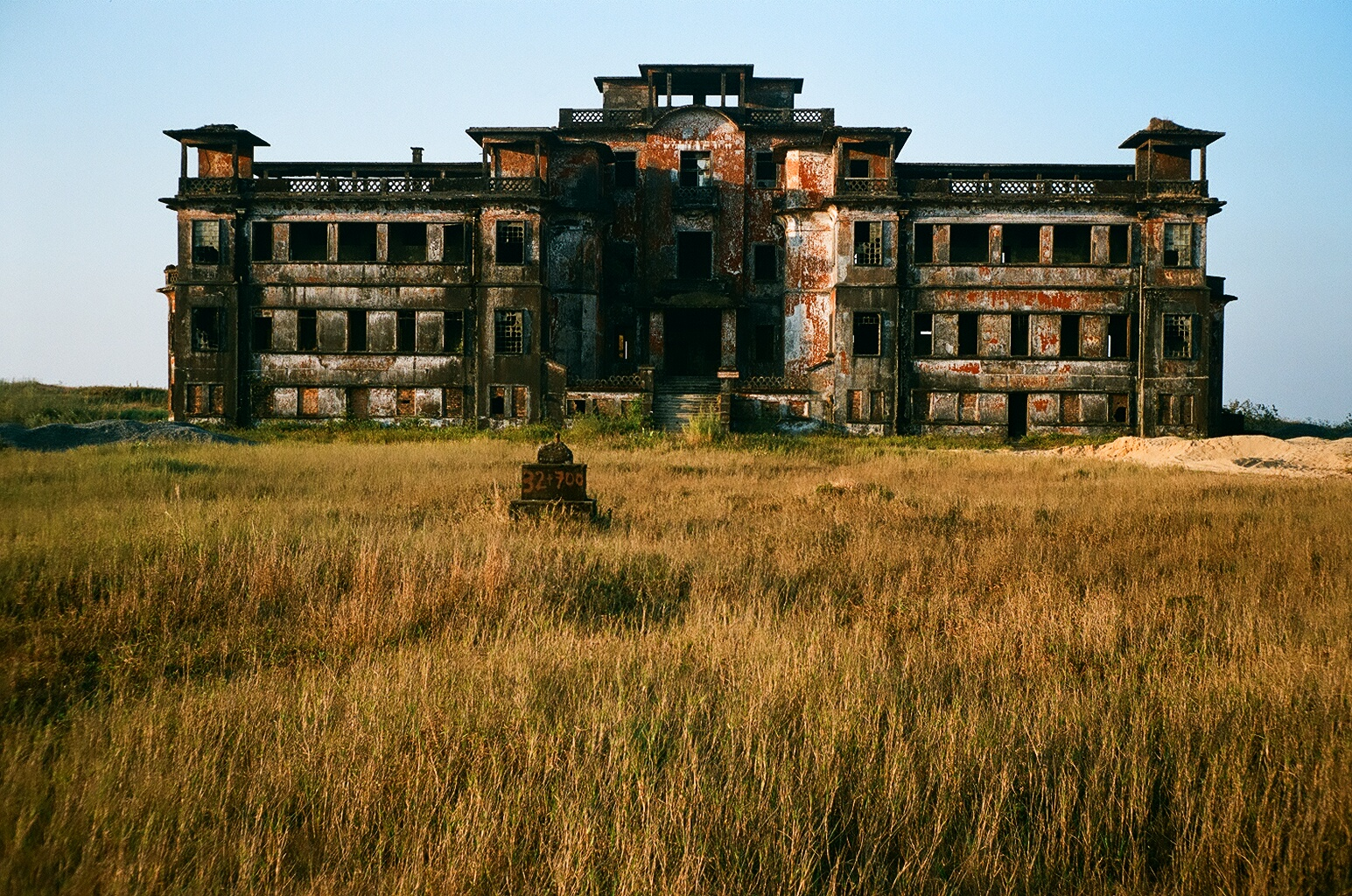
Bokor Hill Station

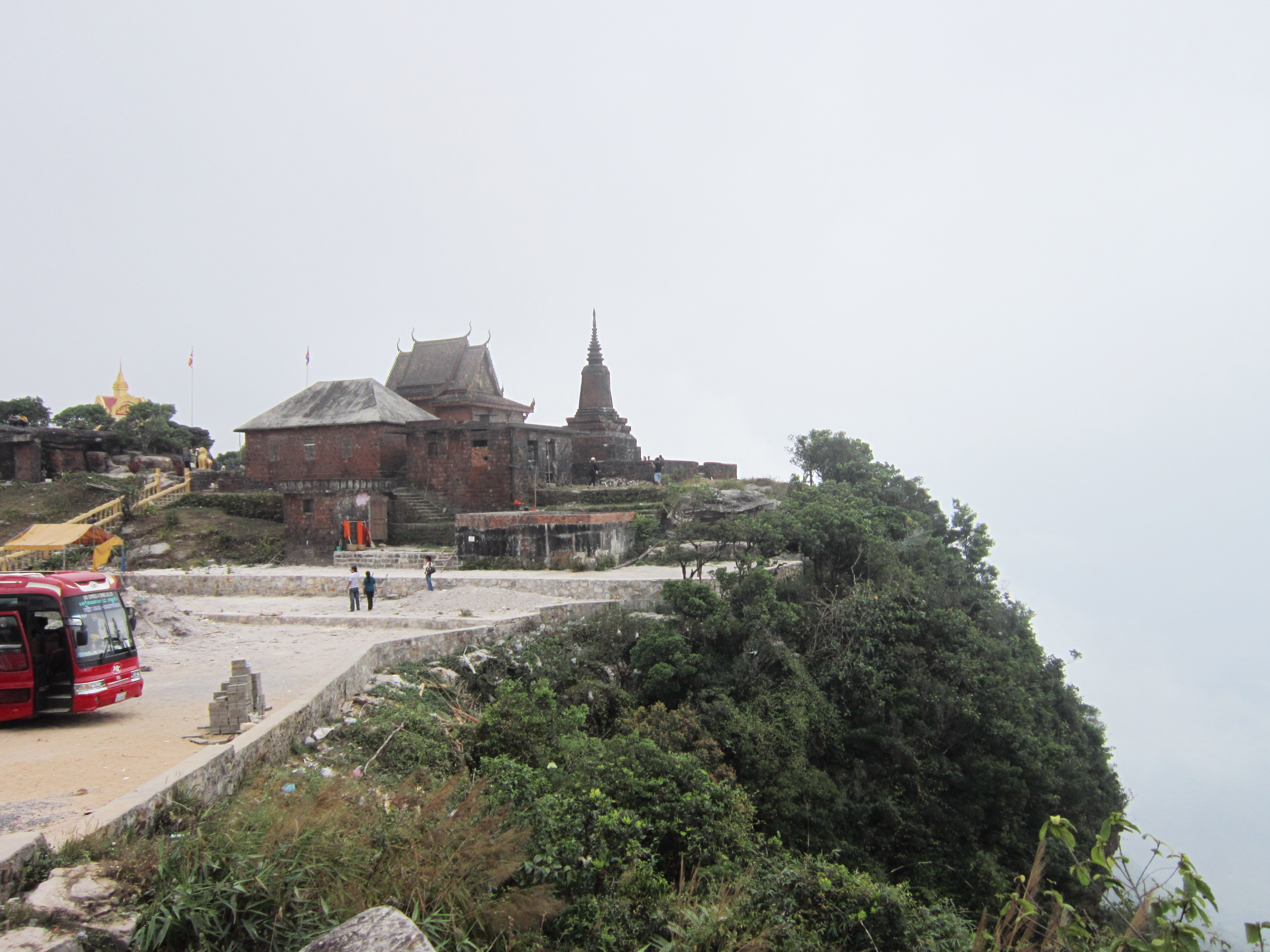
Wat Sompov Pram view from a Distance

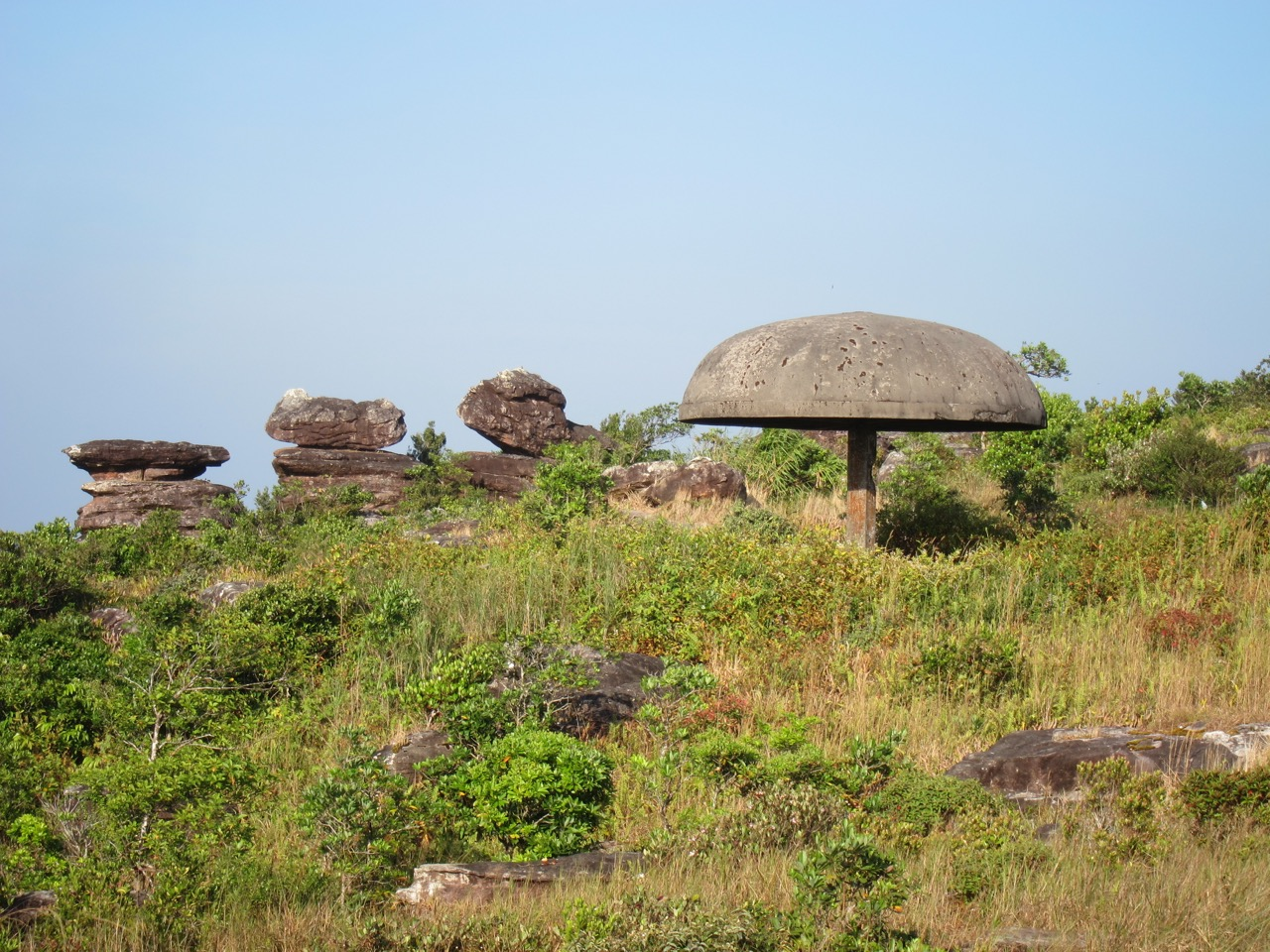
Bokor's Historical Mushroom

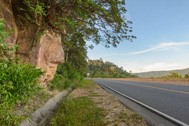
Gaint faced Rock (Thmor Mok Yeak)

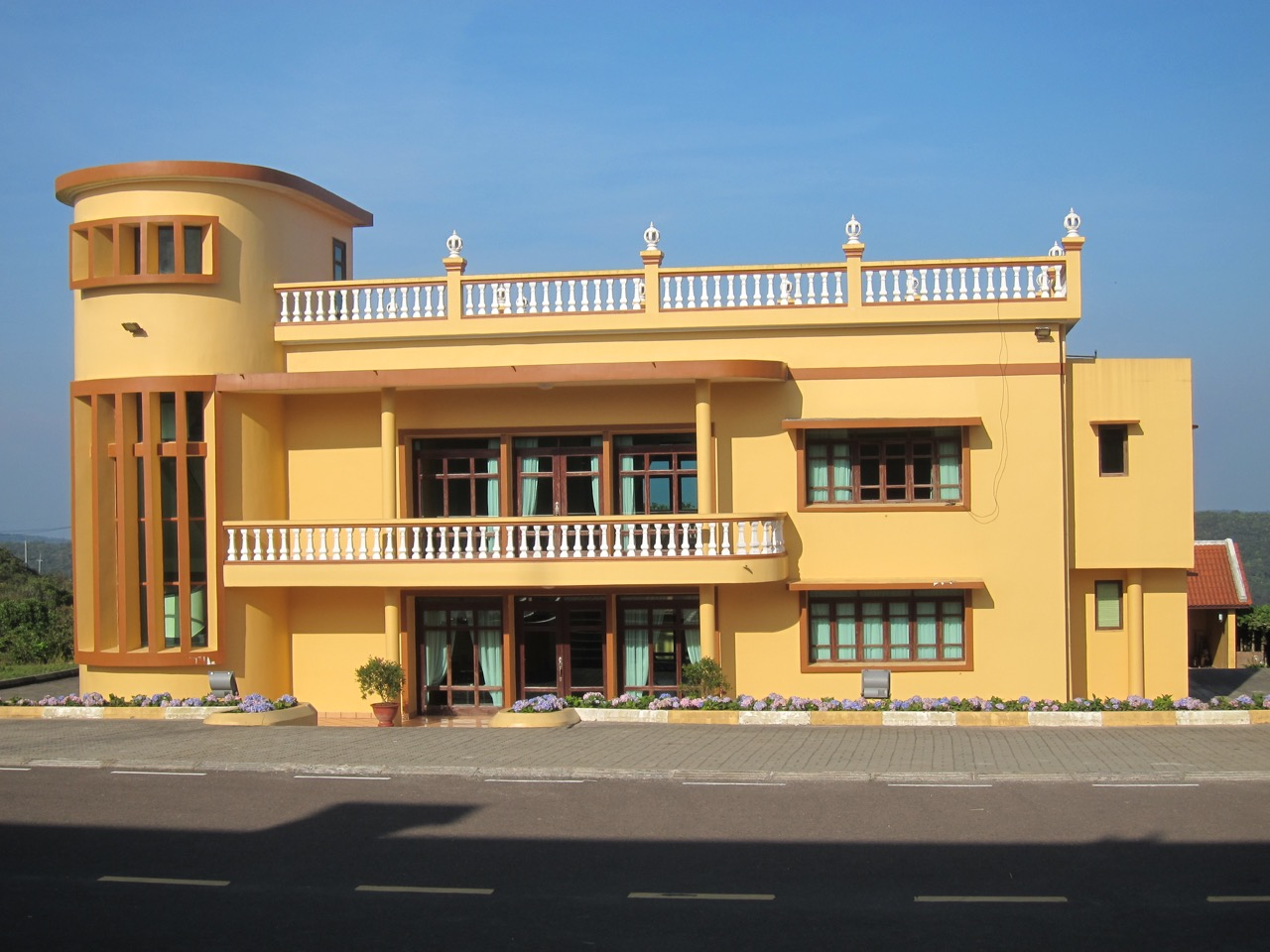
Former residence of King Monivong

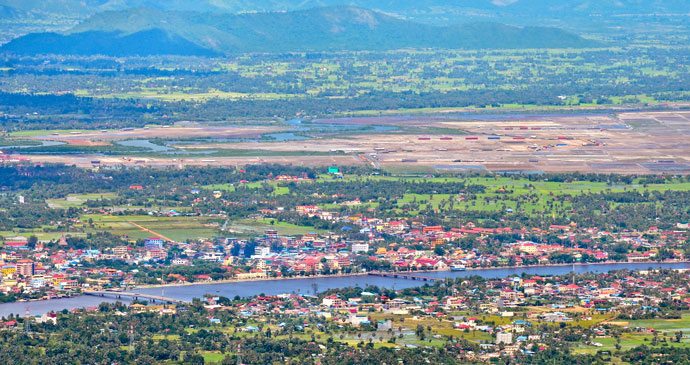
Kampot View from Bokor
