= Church of Mount Bokor =

Old Catholic church in Cambodia

Catholic Church of Mount Mokor
- ព្រះវិហារភ្នំបូកគោ
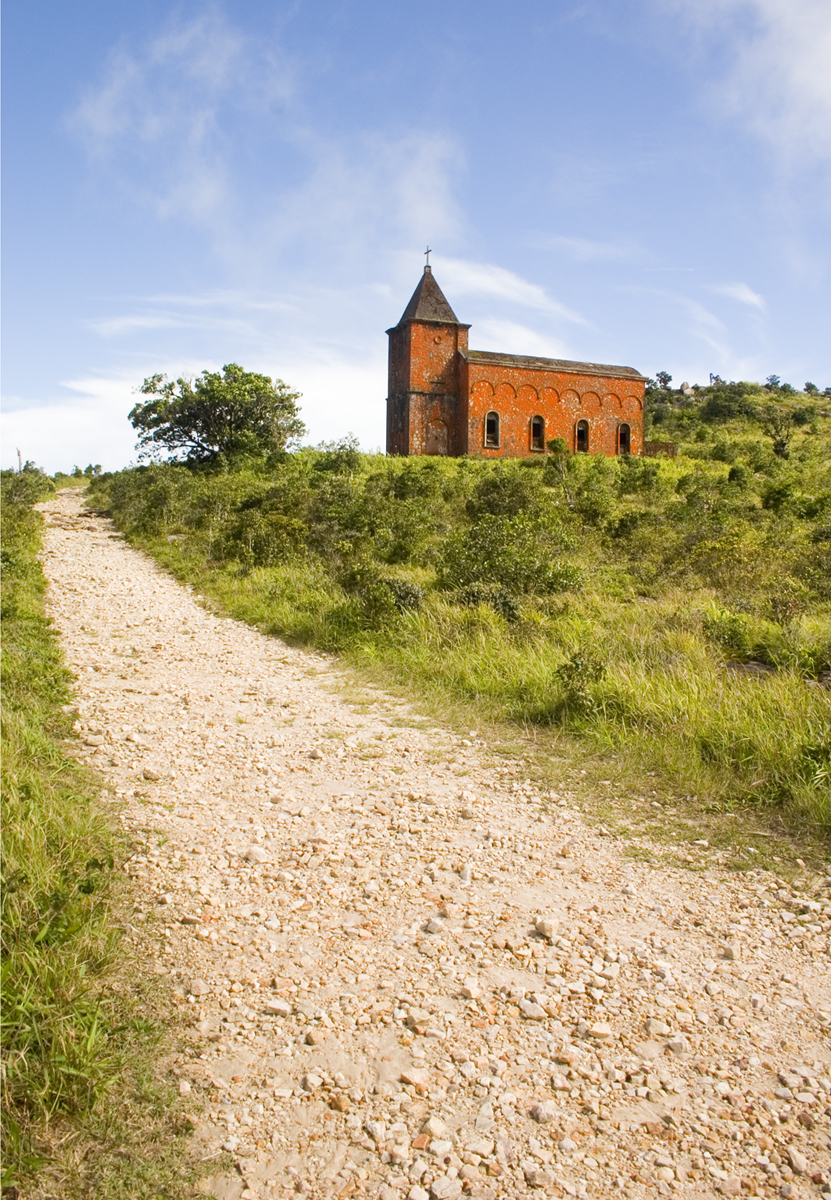
- Old road leading up to Bokor Church
- Catholic Church of Mount Mokor
- 10°37′37″N 104°01′21″E
- Location: Bokor
- Country: Cambodia
- Denomination: Roman Catholic
- Website: https://kampot.pages.dev/bokor_old_church

Architecture
- Architect: Noël Salvarelli
- Style: Romanesque Revival
- Groundbreaking: 1919
- Completed: 1928

Specifications
- Materials: Stone and Brick

Administration
- Diocese: Apostolic Vicariate of Phnom Penh

The Church of Mount Bokor (Khmer: ព្រះវិហារភ្នំបូកគោ) also known as the Old Catholic Church of Bokor Mountain is second-oldest standing Roman Catholic church in the Kingdom of Cambodia atop the Bokor Hill Station. Built in the 1920s, it is one of the few churches in Cambodia to have survived the systematic destruction of churches and pagodas under the terror of the Khmer Rouge. Currently in ruins, a restoration project is under development.

== History ==
=== A church on top of Mount Bokor ===
The works of construction for the church of Mount Bokor began in 1919. The church was wanted by Father Bernard, a Catholic missionary in Cambodia, and with the financial support of Father Nicolas Couvreur, former procurator of the Paris Foreign Missions Society. The construction work was directed by French cartographer Noël Salvarelli, commissioned by the local authorities to build the access road to the new mountain station of Mount Bokor, where is son was baptized once the church was completed.

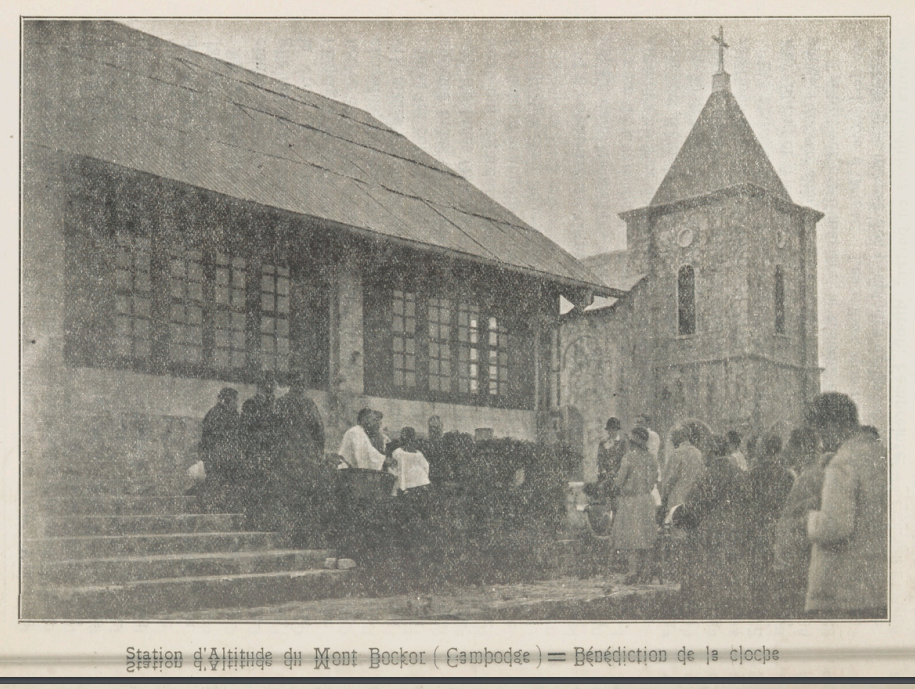
Blessing of the bell of the church of Bokor Church by Monsignor Bouchut, apostolic vicar of Cambodia, in 1928.

In March 1928, after nearly ten years of hard work, due to the remoteness and the logistical difficulties specific to the place, the apostolic vicar Monsignor Jean-Claude Bouchut celebrated the blessing of the church with seven other priests in the presence of the Resident-Superior from Cambodia, Madame Le Fol, as well as many Christians from Phnom Penh and Kampot. The blessing of the bell took place later on the same day and Madame Le Fol, wife of the Resident General, was its godmother while Monsieur Richomme, explorer of the Richomme Trail between Kratié and Saigon was chosen as godfather.

=== A refuge for the Khmers Rouges ===
After the station was abandoned, the church also fell into ruins. The interior was partitioned; boxes, the remains of toilets and kitchen, suggest makeshift barracks, built in the last bastion of the Khmer Rouge. The place of worship was attacked by Vietnamese in the 1980s. When a French battalion of the United Nations Transitional Authority in Cambodia took over Bokor in 1993 and set up its headquarters in the former Bokor Palace Hotel, the Khmer Rouge finally left the church they had occupied nearby since the 1970s.

=== A church in ruins ===
Since the fall of the communist regime and the reestablishment of the monarchy in Cambodia, the Church of Bokor has been one of the few buildings that the Catholic Church has been allowed by the Royal Government of Cambodia to use for religious services, along with the Saint Joseph Church in Phnom Penh, Saint Michael's Church in Sihanoukville, and the piece of land surrounding the old Cathedral of Our Lady of the Assumption in Battambang.

In 2008, travelers still noticed on the walls of the church the impacts of gunfire exchanged during the long years of war in Cambodia.

=== Restitution for restoration ===
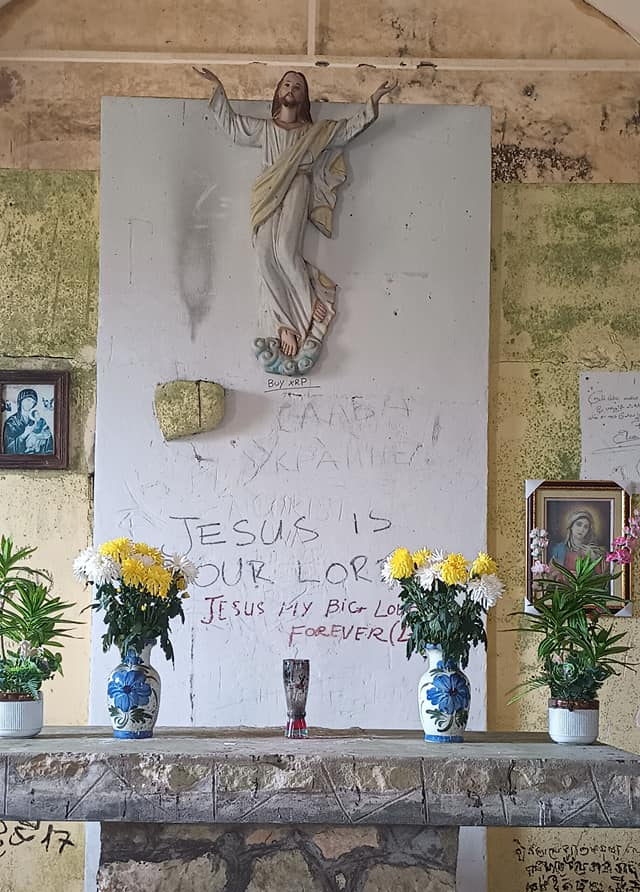
Christ and Mary images with graffiti.

On Christmas Eve 2017, the Royal Government of Cambodia invited the Apostolic Vicar of Cambodia, Bishop Olivier Schmitthaeusler, as well as other representatives of the Catholic Church to officially return the ownership of the building and the surrounding land to the Catholic Church, recognizing the "shameful" use of this sacred place during its occupation by the Khmer Rouge. This restitution was made for the Apostolic Vicariate of Phnom Penh to restore the church, a project for which fundraising was officially launched in May 2021.

== Architecture ==
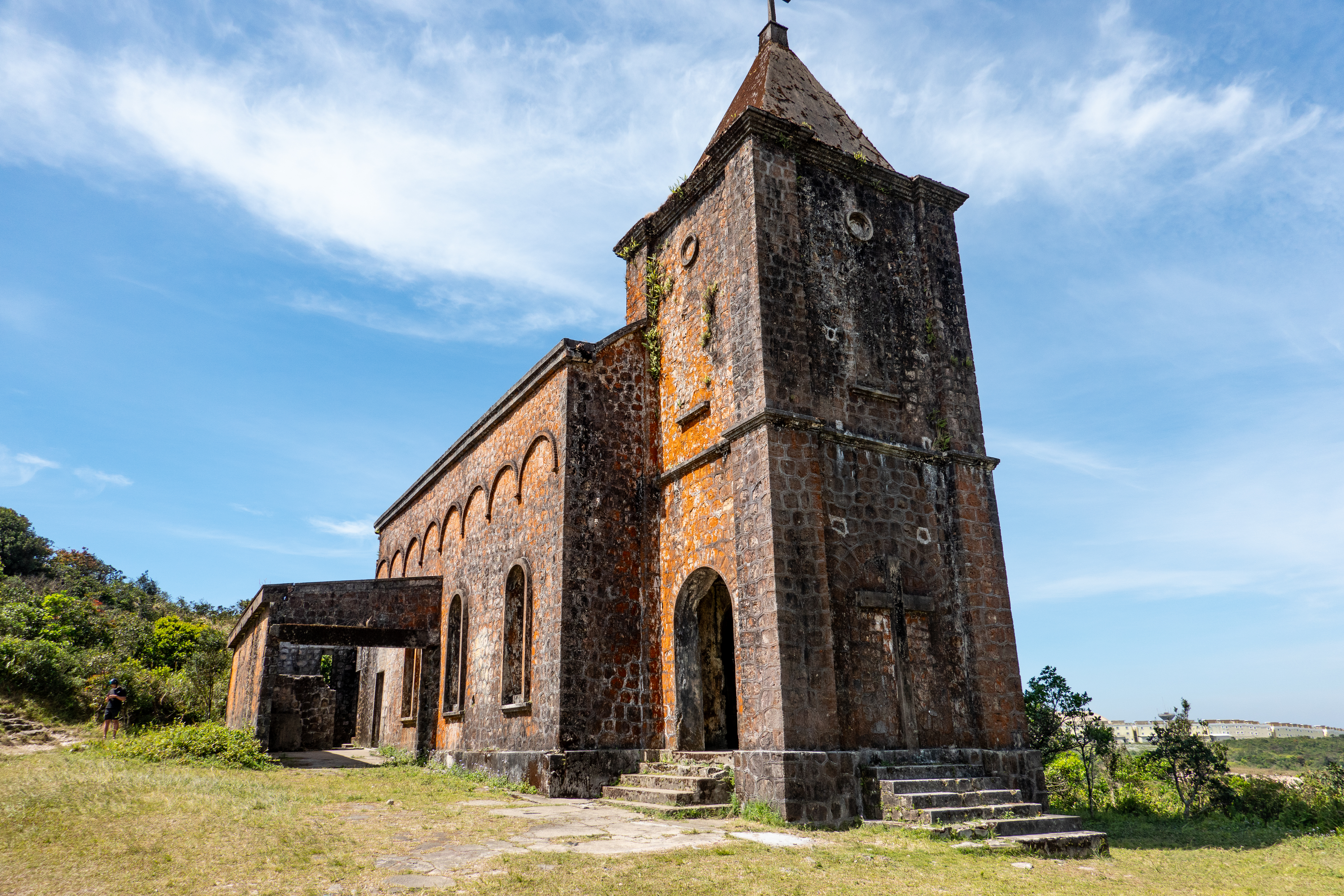
The square belfry blocks the entrance by a Calvary at the top of seven-step staircase.

The church, oriented according to a traditional plan, is made of stones extracted from the sides of the mountain and surmounted by a squat belfry with a surmounting cross made to withstand hurricanes. It is built in a neo-Romanesque style which stands out in the single vault in a cradle, with semicircular arched windows and a band that run alongside the structure. Until 2010, tourists could see fragments of glass brick clinging to the corners of the nave windows with one side window holding the barest outline of a rusty crucifix.

== Popularity ==
=== Christian pilgrimage ===
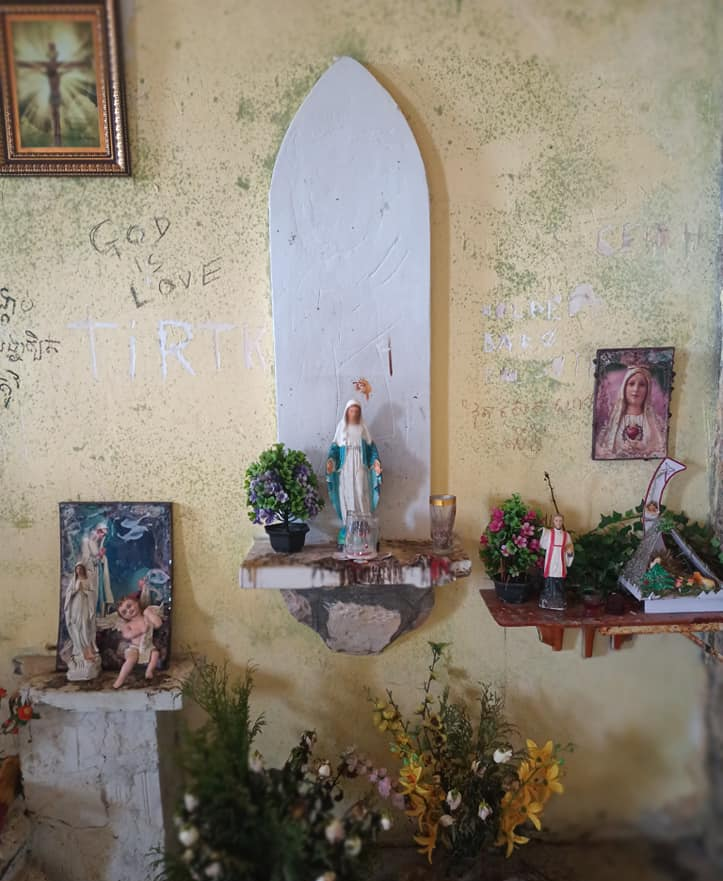
Catholic imagery and objects.

Bokor Church being one of the few churches in Cambodia to have survived the Khmer Rouge massacres, it has become an important place of pilgrimage for the small Catholic community in Cambodia. The church also welcomes many pilgrims from Vietnam, who deposit various devotional objects there: statues of the Sacred Heart and of the Virgin Mary, rosaries, candles, ...

=== Khmer weddings ===
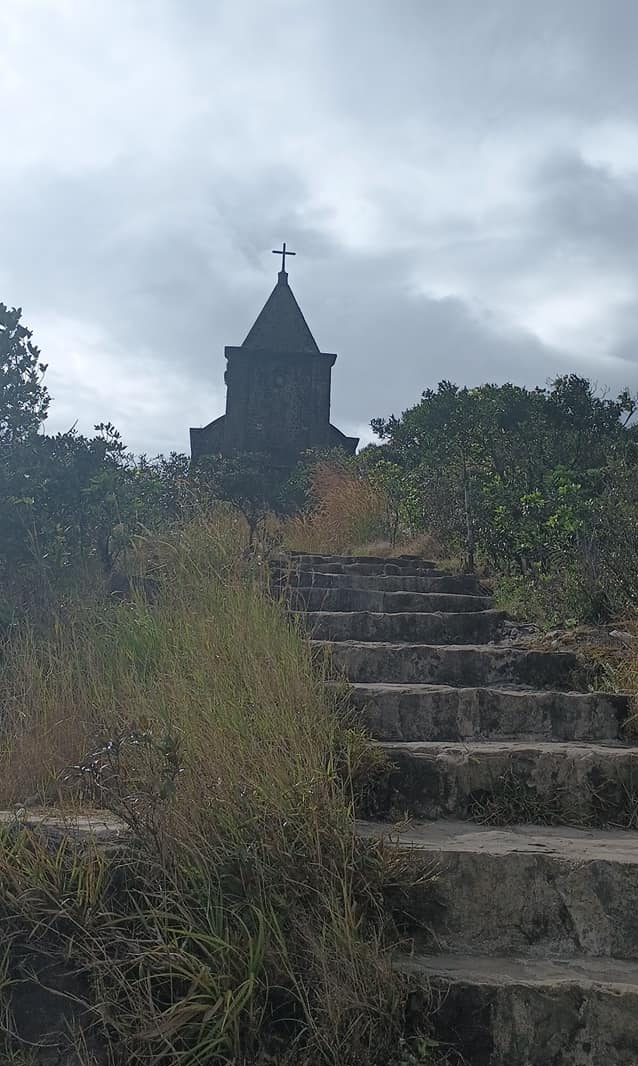
"Abandoned" old church on Mount Bokor.

Bokor Church has become a popular, if not a must-see, location in marriage preparation photography sessions for the Khmers.

=== The abandoned church, nostalgic fantasy and commonplace of literature ===
The church of Bokor, even more than the other ruins of the altitude station, has become the common place of the expression of a nostalgia for the past:

There is a find of worthy voyagers, the ruins of Popokvil atop Bokor Mountain in Cambodia ... There, you'll find the remains of French colonial era-town – a crumbling post-office, an empty Catholic church.

— Ann Laura Stoler, Imperial Debris: Reflections on Ruins and Ruination.

Its derelict state and misty climate throughout the year has also made it into a common place in the literature for horror stories.

== See also ==
- Catholic Church in Cambodia
- St Joseph's Church, Phnom Penh
