= Yeay Mao =

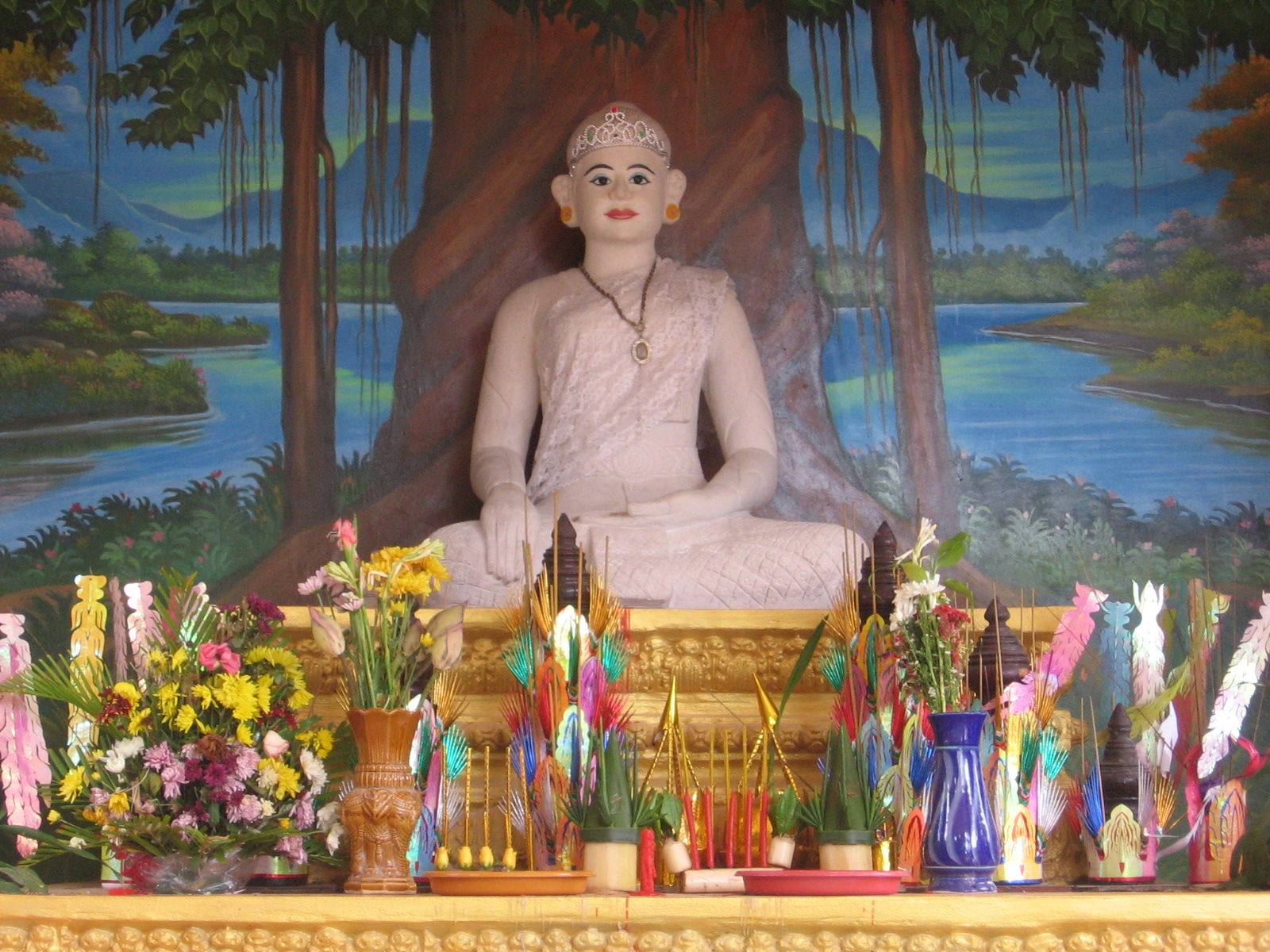
Altar to Yeay Mao in Riem Pagoda, Sihanoukville.

Yeay Mao or Lok Yeay Mao (Khmer: យាយម៉ៅ - លោកយាយម៉ៅ, simplified Chinese: 义毛; traditional Chinese: 義毛; pinyin: Yìmáo, or simplified Chinese: 老义毛; traditional Chinese: 老義毛; pinyin: Lǎo Yìmáo, Grandma Mao) is an ancient mythical heroine and a neak ta divinity in the local popular form of Buddhism and Brahmanism in Cambodia. She is venerated mainly as the guardian of coastal provinces of the country. She is venerated especially along the road from Phnom Penh to the sea port of Sihanoukville, as well as in Kampot, Koh Kong, and Kep. At the Bokor Mountain in Kampot there is a 29 meters tall monument to Yeay Mao inaugurated in 2012, while there is a young version of Yeay Mao in the Kep Beach called Beautiful Lady (ស្រីស្អាត) or Sela waits for her husband (សិលាចាំប្តី), but that belongs to the legend of Mao looking to the west for her lost husband. She is considered the protector of travelers, hunters, and fishermen. Drivers still stop at her shrine along National Road 4 near Phnom Pech Nil to pay their respects and wash their cars with water from the stream nearby, as well as the monument at Bokor. In 2023, after a surge of car accidents on the Phnom Penh- Preah Sihanouk's expressway, the government decided to build a shrine for her at Sre Ambil station for travelers to stop along and pray.

== History ==
The history of Yeay Mao is unclear, being composed of several legends and interpretations. There are many popular stories surrounding her. It is said that she was a beautiful lady married to a powerful warrior. When he died, she took control of the armies against the Thai and became a celebrity and national hero. The story is placed sometime before the French Colony (1863–1953).

Another version says that Yeay Mao was the wife of Ta Krohom-Koh (តាក្រហមក) - literally "Grandpa Red Neck". They lived in the forest near Pech Nil Mountain (ភ្នំពេជ្រនិល). Once they went around and they met a tiger. Ta Krohom-Koh abandoned his wife and the tiger devoured her.

Since then, any traveller who passed by the place of the accident, paid respect to her spirit to avoid a similar fate.

When they built the highway between Phnom Penh and the sea in what is today Sihanoukville, a small shrine was built at the spot. The road was finished by the French in 1876, a fact that increased the pilgrimage to the shrine. It included Vietnamese and Chinese believers.

== Celebration ==
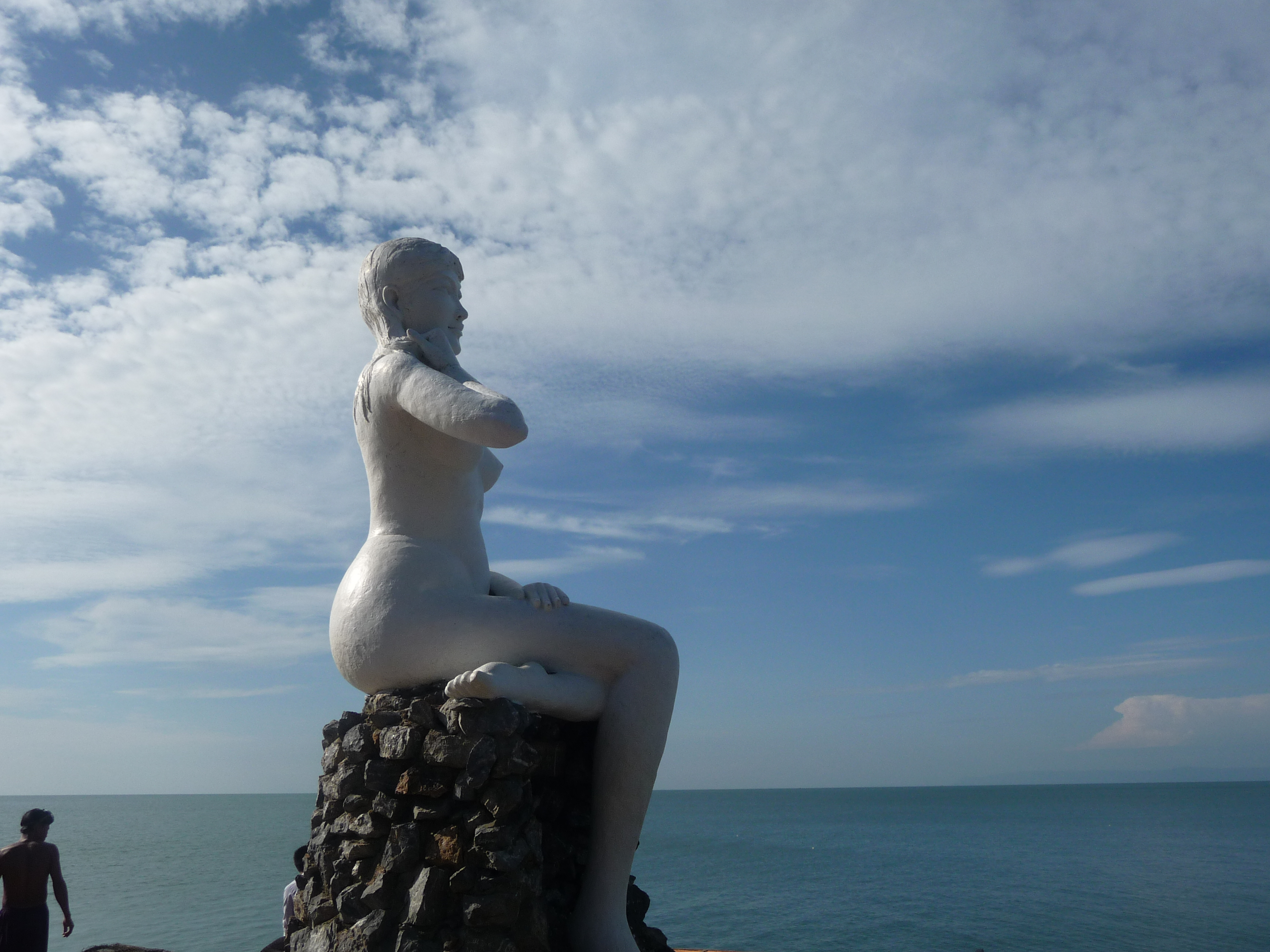
Sela waits for her husband (សិលាចាំប្តី), a monument in Kep Province inspired in a version of Yeay Mao, whose husband went to the wars with Siam and never returns, so she decided to go to the west in his search.

The main feast is celebrated in June. The believers go to the Shrine or any place destined for the veneration, to bring sacred food, especially pig head, chicken soup, the sla-thoa (ស្លាធម៌) - a coconut adorned with flowers and leaves and used in religious celebrations in Cambodia, the bay-sei (បាយសី)- section of banana tree trunk with legs to which three to nine layers of banana leaves rolled up in finger shape have been attached. It is used also in certain ceremonies. .

The place of the veneration must be set with three statues:

1. Yeay Sau (យាយសៅរ៍): A female spirit, that is the wife of Ung (អ៊ុង), the kaporal thnal (កាប៉ូរ៉ាលថ្នល់), guard of the paths.
2. Ta Snang Long (តាស្នងឡុង): "Grandpa Snang Long", considered the son of Yeay Sau and Ung.
3. Long Mao: She is the same "Yeay Mao".

== Beliefs ==
According to Seik Sopat and Sadang Tuo, the story of Yeay Mao dates from 1866, when she was a spirit of cruelty that attacked any traveller that did not pay respects to her at Pech Nil Mountain (ភ្នំពេជ្រនិល).

If the person to whom the spirit sent strong pains because ignoring to pay veneration to her, repented, that person was healed. But if that person did not repent, he or she could die.

It was also believed that if a person presented his offering asking to hurt an enemy, the spirit used to fulfil the wish.

In 1900, the French army destroyed the first shrine and the divinity came in decadence.

During the short Japanese invasion of Cambodia in 1940, the army of that country gathered the farmers of Kampot Province and Vietnamese, Chinese and Cham Cambodians, to dig trenches at the ancient sacred place. According to the legend, the workers desecrated the site, bringing the fury of the spirit. People started to suffer epidemics and many died. They explained these epidemics as the fury of Yeay Mao.

In order to placate the spirit, the people started again to offer gifts to Yeay Mao and the veneration revived. After the villages near to Pech Nil Mountain, pray to the divinity asking for health and protection. If there was, for example, a theft, they pray to the spirit to punish the criminal.
