= Dâmrei Mountains =

Mountain range in Cambodia

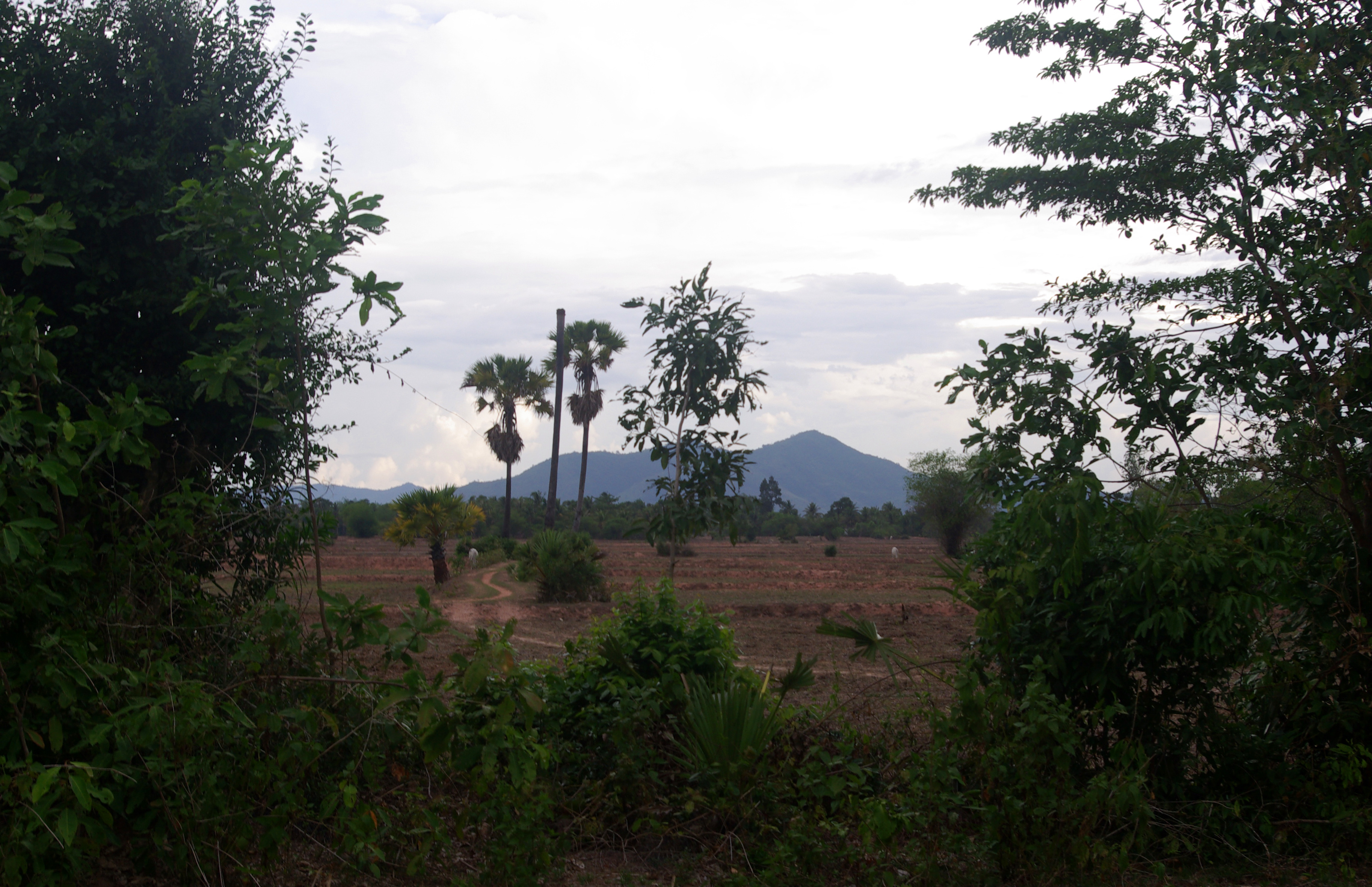
- Dâmrei Mountains on the horizon

Highest point
- Peak: Phnom Bokor
- Elevation: 1,081 m (3,547 ft)
- Coordinates: 10°37′00″N 104°03′00″E

Dimensions
- Length: 110 km (68 mi) N/S
- Width: 32 km (20 mi) E/W

Geography
- Location within Cambodia
- Country: Cambodia
- Parent range: Cardamom Mountains

Climbing
- Easiest route: Drive

The Dâmrei Mountains (literally the "Elephant Mountains", Khmer: ភ្នំដំរី, Chuŏr Phnum Dâmrei), refer to a mountain range situated in south-western Cambodia, traversing around 110 km (68 mi) north-south as a succession of the Cardamom Mountains, dropping abruptly to the sea near the town of Kampot. The Elephant Mountains represent the easternmost parts of the original extent of the wet evergreen forests that include Cambodia's south and the mountains east of Bangkok in Thailand.

== Description ==
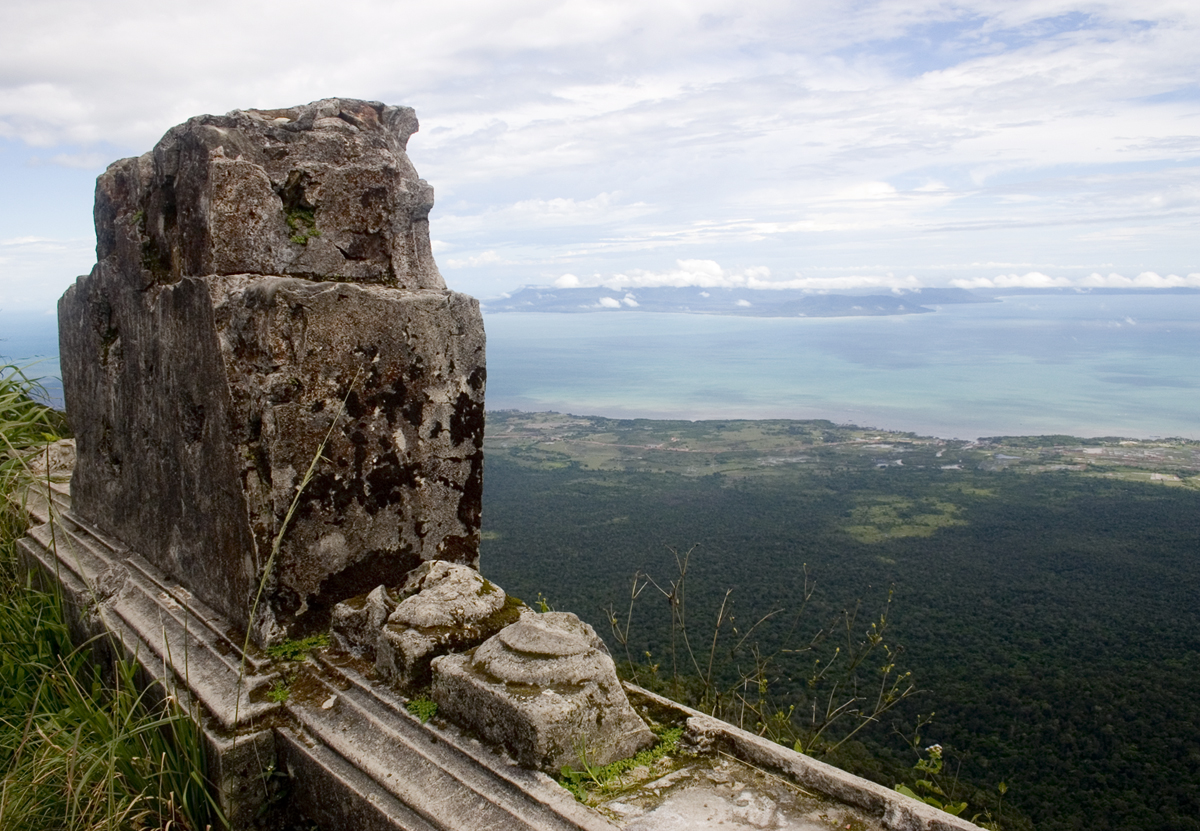
Panoramic view of Kampot and the sea from Phnom Bokor

The range is a southern offshoot of the Krâvanh or Cardamom Mountains, occupying a much smaller area. The highest elevation is Phnom Bokor at 1,081 metres (3,547 ft) above sea level. Located close to the shores of the Gulf of Siam, the densely wooded hills receive some of the heaviest rainfall in Cambodia, averaging 150–200 inches (3,800–5,000 mm) annually on their western slopes (which are subject to southwest monsoons) but only 40–60 inches (1,020–1,520 mm) on their eastern slopes, because of the rain shadow.

The Dâmrei Mountains were, until 1975, the principal centre of Cambodia's pepper-growing industry. After the intervening years of civil war and upheavals pepper-growing has revived slowly beginning from the late 1990s.

== National park and tourism ==
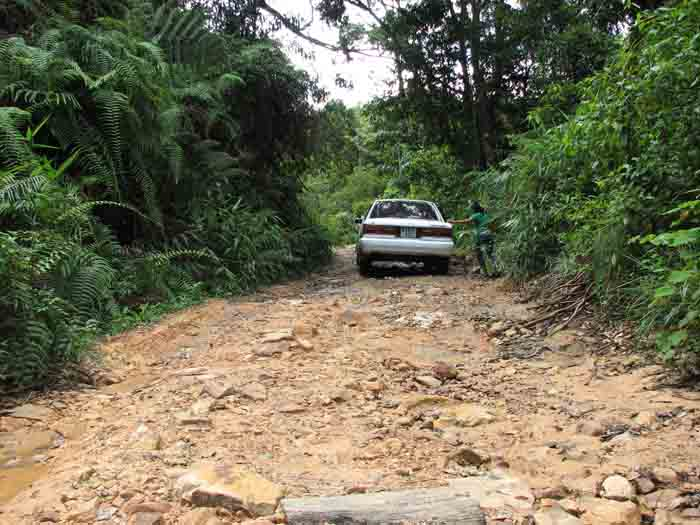
the old road to Bokor, Damrei Mountains

Phnom Bokor National Park occupies most of the highland plateaus and summits of the Dâmrei Mountains. The authorities are trying to curb illegal logging. The park has a great variety of plant species, including rare orchids, an endemic pitcher plant only first described in 2009, as well as some spectacular waterfalls during the rainy season.

There are several historic and cultural sites in the national park area. Bokor Hill Station (Station d'altitude de Bokor) is an abandoned French settlement on top of Phnom Bokor, where elite French colonial officers spent holidays during the hot season. The place also has a church and a palace, all in a dilapidated condition. Nearby there is a Cambodian army outpost which doubles as a youth hostel. Both sites are now becoming tourist attractions, and the road to reach them, originally built in 1907 at the cost of many human lives, has recently been modernised. As of 2014, the 32 km road connecting National Route 3 to Phnom Bokor is completed. In 2012, the large luxury hotel of Thansur Bokor Highland Resort, located near the Bokor Hill Station, was completed.

== See also ==
- Bokor Hill Station
- Preah Monivong National Park
- Bokor
