= Bokor Hill Station =

French colonial buildings in Kampot, Cambodia

Bokor Hill Station ស្ថានីយភ្នំបូកគោ Station d'altitude de Bokor
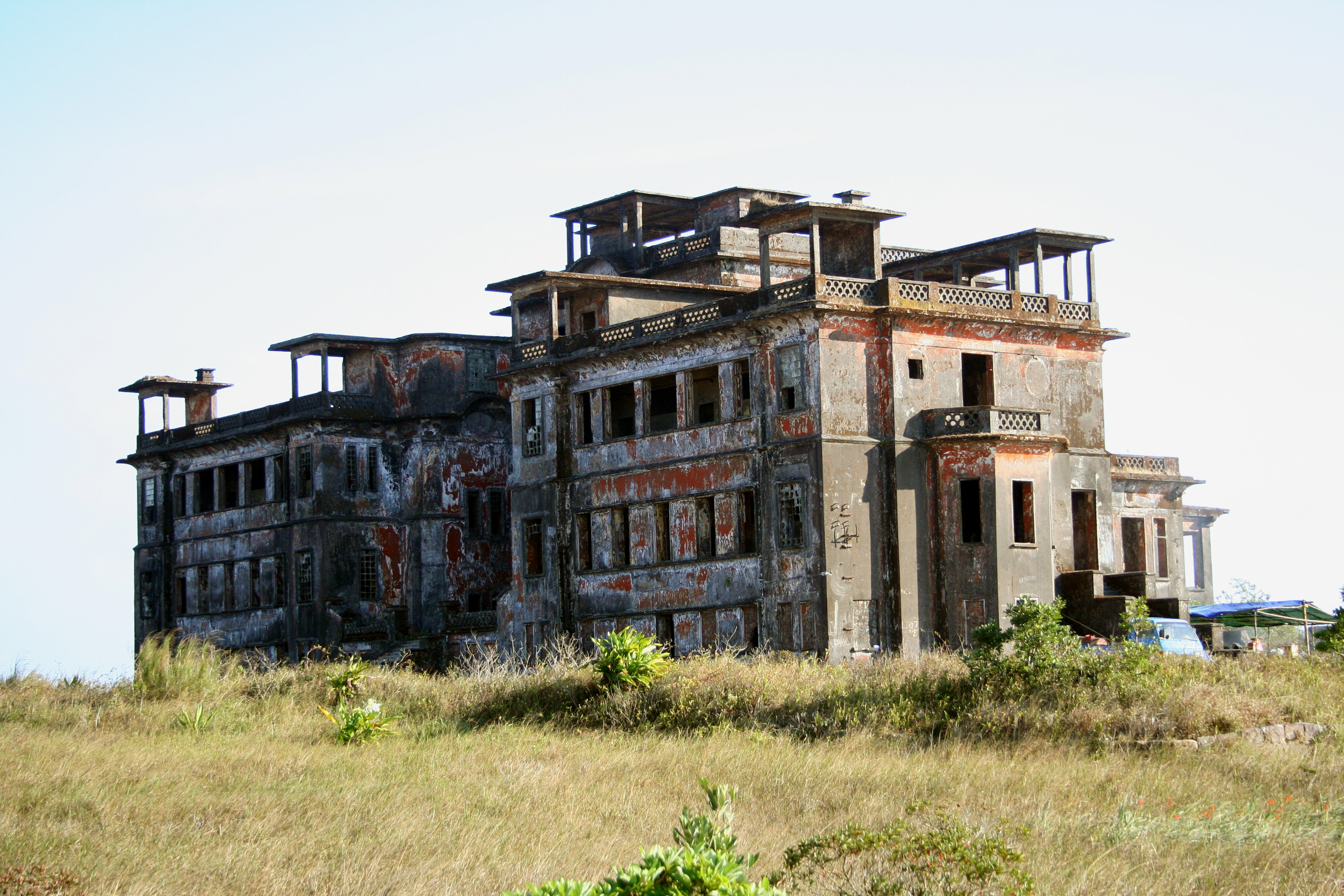
- The abandoned Bokor Palace Hotel (2007)

- Location within Cambodia
- Coordinates: 10°37′49.47″N 104°1′2.16″E
- Country: Cambodia
- Province: Kampot
- City: Bokor
- Municipality: Bokor
- Built: 1921
- Elevation: 1,048 m (3,438 ft)

Population (2011)
  - Total: 4,000
- Time zone: UTC+07:00 (ICT)

Bokor Hill Station (Khmer: ស្ថានីយភ្នំបូកគោ, Sthaniy Phnum Bokkoŭ; French: Station d'altitude de Bokor) refers to a collection of French colonial buildings constructed as a temperate mountain luxury resort and retreat for colonial residents in the early 1920s atop Bokor Mountain in Preah Monivong National Park, about 37 km (23 mi) west of Kampot in southern Cambodia. Abandoned for long periods of time, modern infrastructure has made the location easily accessible as re-development is taking place. It was used as the location for the final showdown of the movie City of Ghosts (2002) and the 2004 film R-Point. To the north-east are the Povokvil Waterfalls.

== History ==
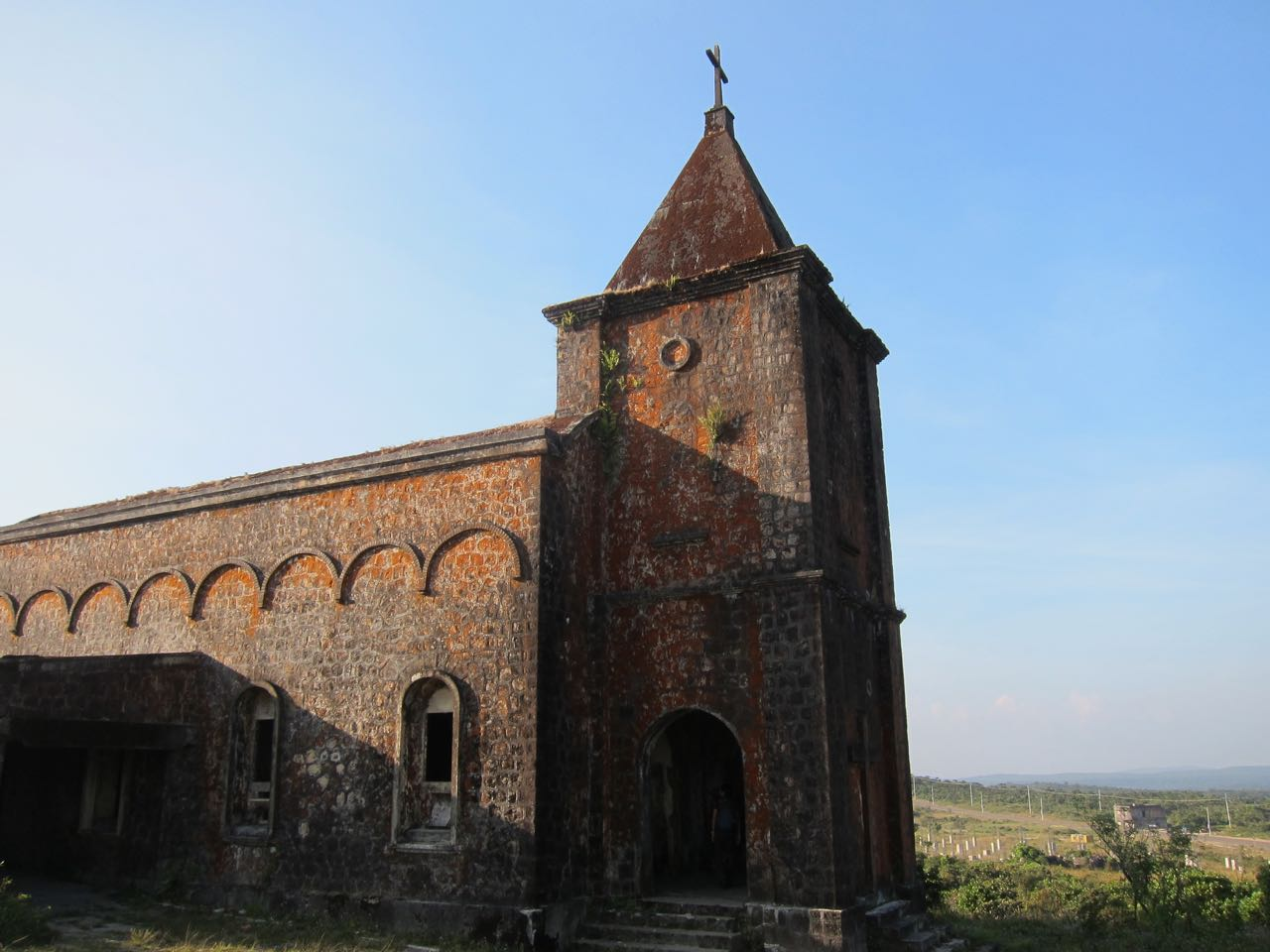
The Old Catholic church was built by the French in the early 1920s.

The Damrei Mountains have long been considered sacred and venerated by the Cambodians.

The hill station was built as a resort by colonial French to help the French military who were stationed in that region. They were desperate for some relief from the oppressive heat that is characteristic to this part of the world. So in the early 1920's, Bokor Hill, a small resort town was built especially for the occupying French soldiers. Nine hundred people died in nine months during the construction of the resort in this remote mountain location.

The centrepiece of the resort was the grand Bokor Palace Hotel, inaugurated in 1925. It has been complemented by the villa of the "Résident Supérieur", a post office (now demolished), and a catholic church. It is also an important cultural site, showing how the colonial settlers spent their free time.

Bokor Hill was abandoned first by the French in late 1940s, during the First Indochina War, because of local insurrections guided by the Khmer Issarak.

It was only in 1962, for the reopening of the "Cité du Bokor", that a casino was established in the new hotels near the lake, (Hotels Sangkum and Kiri). Some buildings were added at this time: an annex for the palace, the mayor's office and a concrete parasol.

The Bokor mountain was abandoned again in 1972, as Khmer Rouge took over the area. During the Vietnamese invasion in 1979, Khmer Rouge entrenched themselves and held on tightly for months. In the early 1990s Bokor Hill was still one of the last strongholds of Khmer Rouge.

== Transportation ==
Thanks to modern infrastructure 3,540 ft (1,079 m) high Bokor can now conveniently be reached via National Highway 3 near the town of Kampot. The ascent previously required a 32 km (20 mi) grind on an old road that took 1.5 hours to complete. However, as at December 2011, construction was essentially completed on the new sealed road from National Highway 3 up to the hill station. The road is special in its use of battered slopes and drainage systems in an attempt to prevent landslides. Construction was also well under way on a number of buildings in the hill station area, with the area being partially signed and popular with Cambodian and foreign tourists.

== Modern day ==
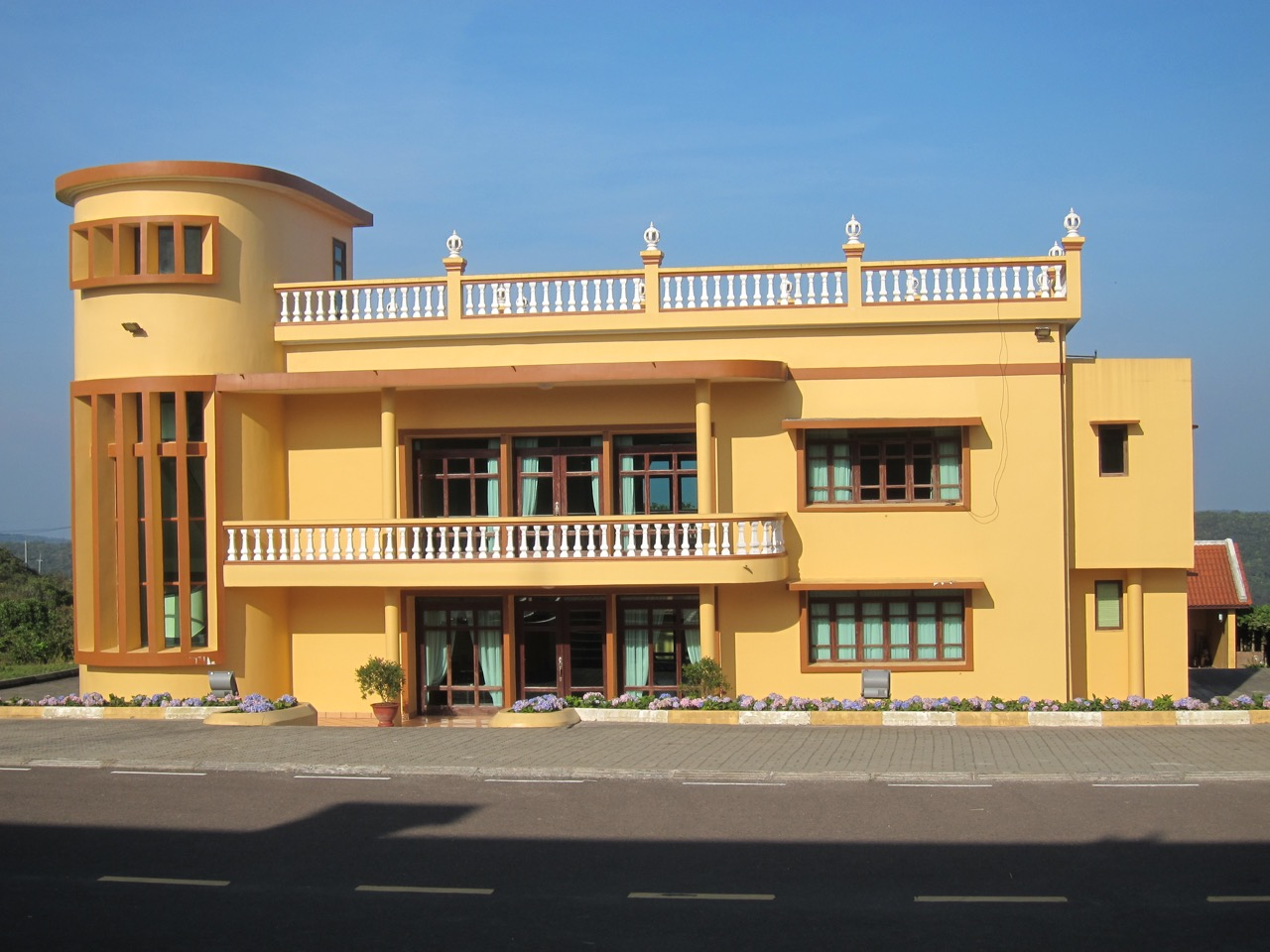
Former residence of King Monivong.

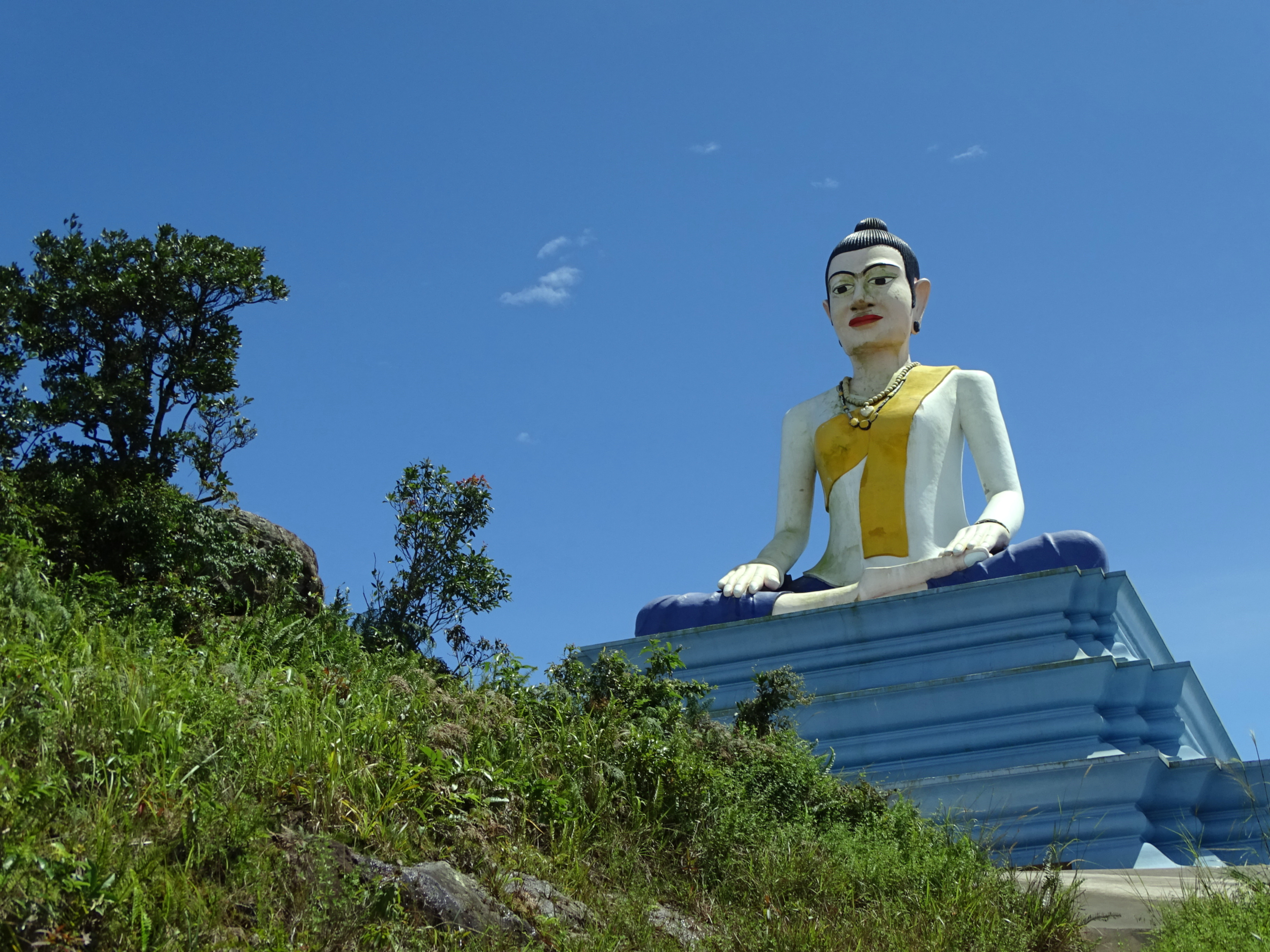
Statue of Yeay Mao (Grandmother Mao)

Now abandoned, with the exception of the old post office, most of the buildings are still standing. The strategic importance of the location is underlined by the fact that the Cambodian authorities maintain a ranger station on the site. The only other historic building currently in use on the site is a small temple. There is also a waterfall which tends to be dry in high season and in full flow during rainy season. About 10 km before on the way for Bokor Hill Station there is the Black Palace (Damnak Sla Khmao). It was a little summer palace of King Sihanouk, abandoned some decades ago.

The site is owned by the government but is now under 99–year lease to the Sokimex Group who are undertaking to relay the road and redevelop the site, repairing the old hotel and casino along with new buildings (hotels, hospital, restaurants, golf clubs etc.). The project was announced on Jan 19th 2008, construction of the road and resort was expected to take 30 months at a cost of US$21 million. The Thansur Bokor Highland Resort hotel opened in 2012. The subsequent re-development is budgeted at US$1 billion over the next 15 years after which a further application may be submitted to create a larger Bokor city, the plans for which are unknown.
