= Kampot (disambiguation) =

Kampot is a city in southern Cambodia.

Kampot may also refer to:

- Kampot Province, province of Cambodia
- Kampot Municipality, a municipality in Cambodia
- Battle of Kampot, a battle which took place in Cambodia (1973–1974)
- Kampot (crater), a crater on Mars
- Kampot pepper, black pepper grown and produced in Cambodia
- Kampot languages of Brazil
- Kampot, an alternative spelling of the Slavic drink Kompot

== See also ==
- Compote (disambiguation)
