= Phnom Sorsia =

Buddhist hill complex in Cambodia

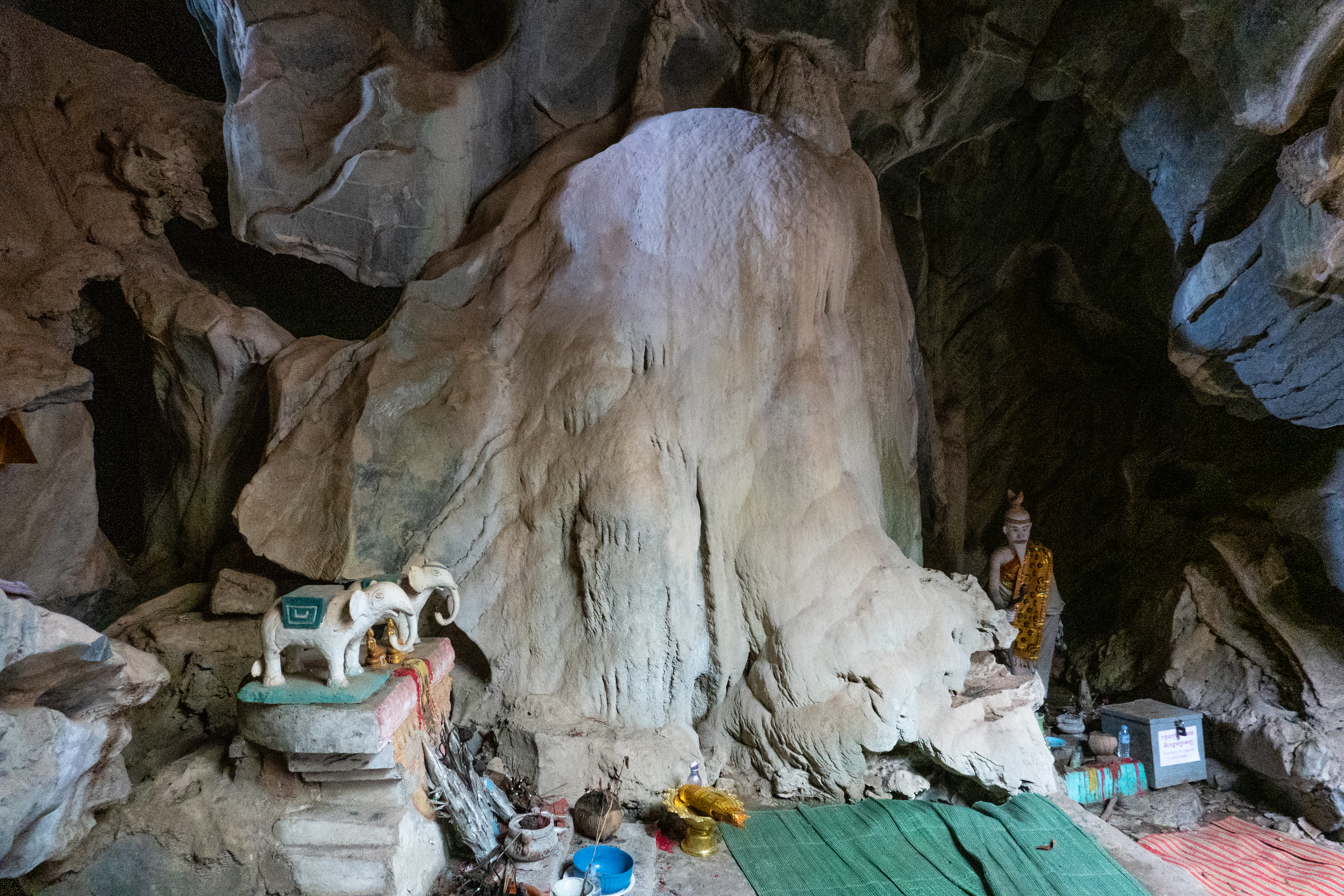
- White Elephant Cave, Phnom Sorsia

Highest point
- Coordinates: 10°33′57″N 104°17′02″E

Geography
- Location within Cambodia
- Location: Kampot Province, Cambodia

Phnom Sorsia is a Buddhist hill complex in Kampot Province, southern Cambodia. It contains Buddhist cultural features approached by a staircase and a complex of karst caves. One cave, Rung Damrey Saa ("White Elephant's Cave"), has a stalagmite resembling the head of an elephant; another has a bat colony. The gateway to the caves is marked by a pagoda, approximately 1 kilometre (0.6 mi) from the main road.

== Geography ==
The complex is located about 11 miles (18 km) east of Kampot. It is accessed via a dirt road which veers from the NH33; signage refers to the site as the Phnom Sorsia Resort. Phnom Sorsia, Phnom Chhnork, Kep, and Bokor National Park make up a popular day trip of the Kampot Province.

The forest-covered hill has several limestone caves. The White Elephant Cave is so named as there are many stalagmites in the limestone formations which resemble white elephants. East of Phnom Sorsia is the "Bat Cave", with a population of several thousand bats. They come out to the surface through a narrow chimney-type passage, and are hunted by bamboo-wielding local residents who swat at them while they are airborne. A concealed pool with cool water is approached through a hole. The vistas from the top of the mountain are of rice fields.

== Culture ==
Phnom Sorsia is considered a holy hill. Steps have been carved in the slopes in a winding formation, to reach both the top of the mountain and the White Elephant Cave. Cultural features include two Buddha statues to the right of the White Elephant Cave, a garishly painted temple, as well as a stupa on top of the hill.

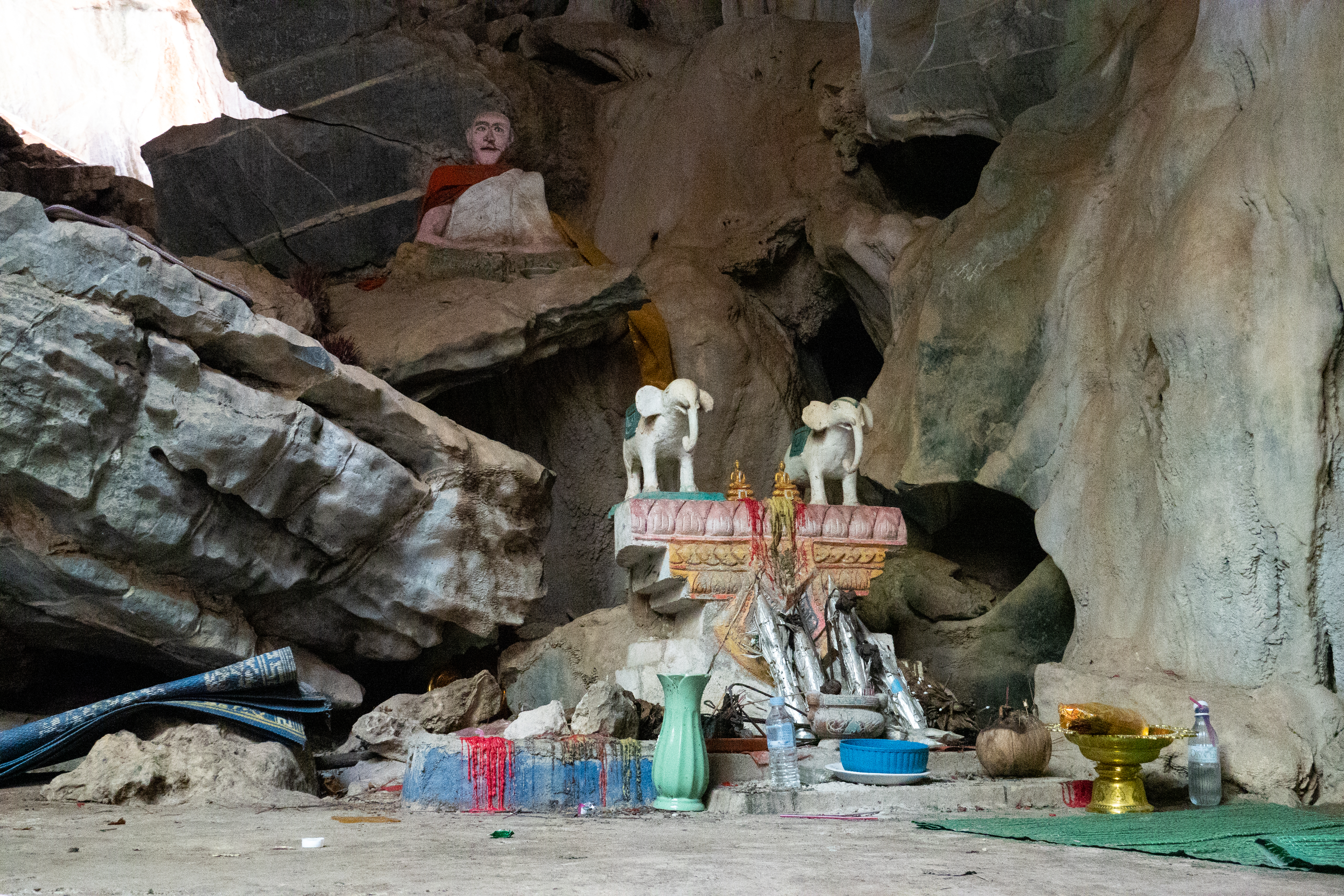
White Elephant Cave

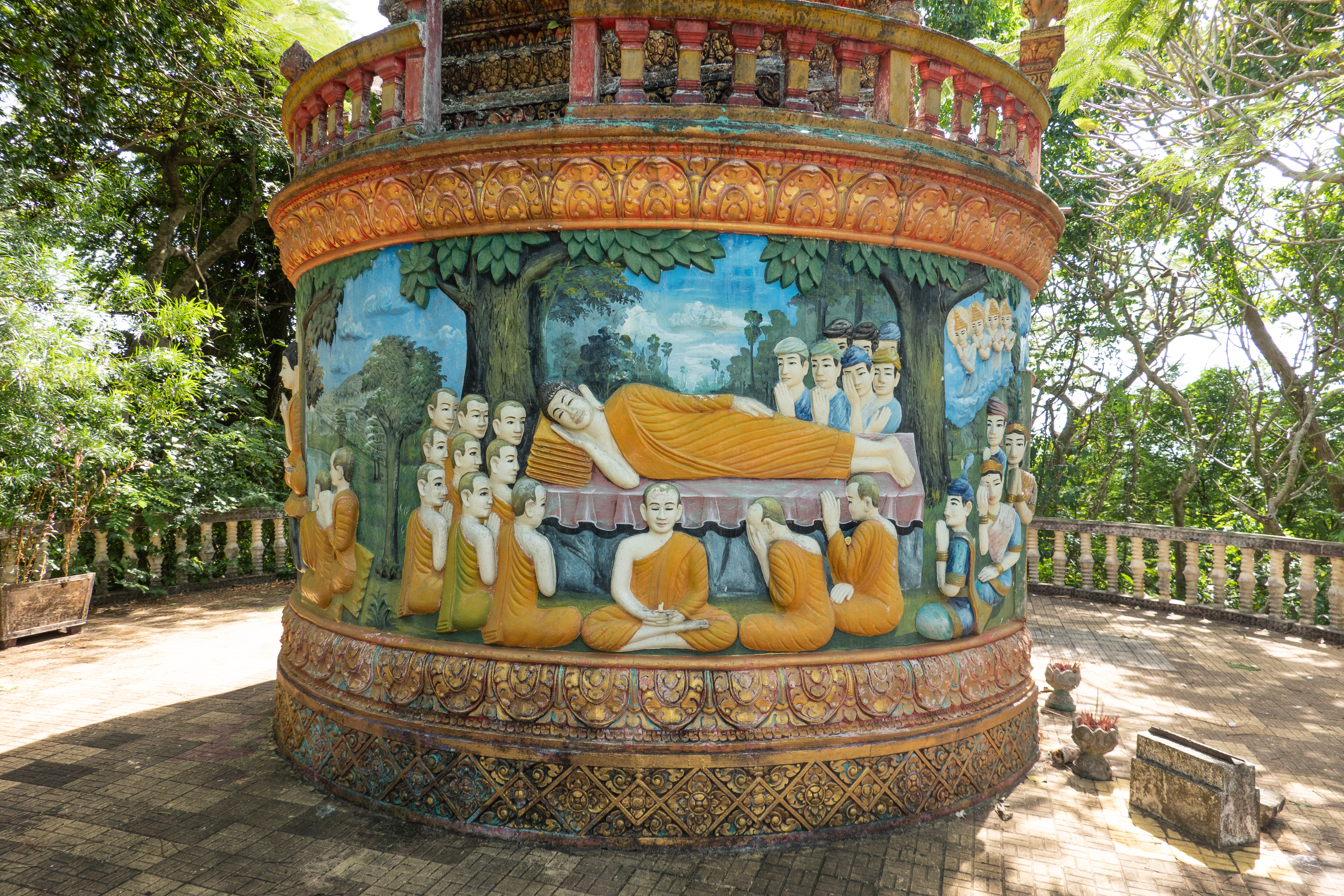
Phnom Sorsia, Kampot

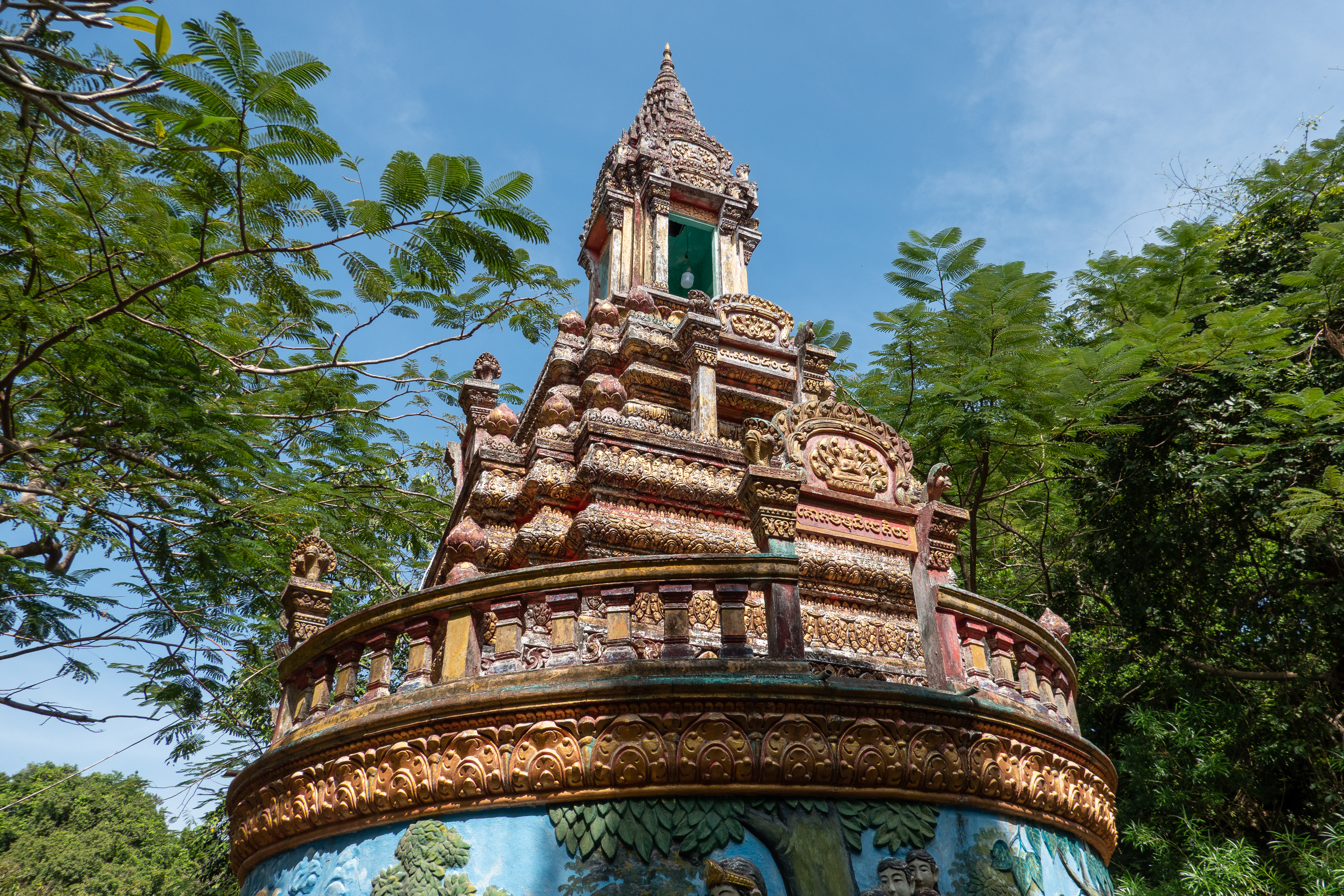
Phnom Sorsia, Kampot

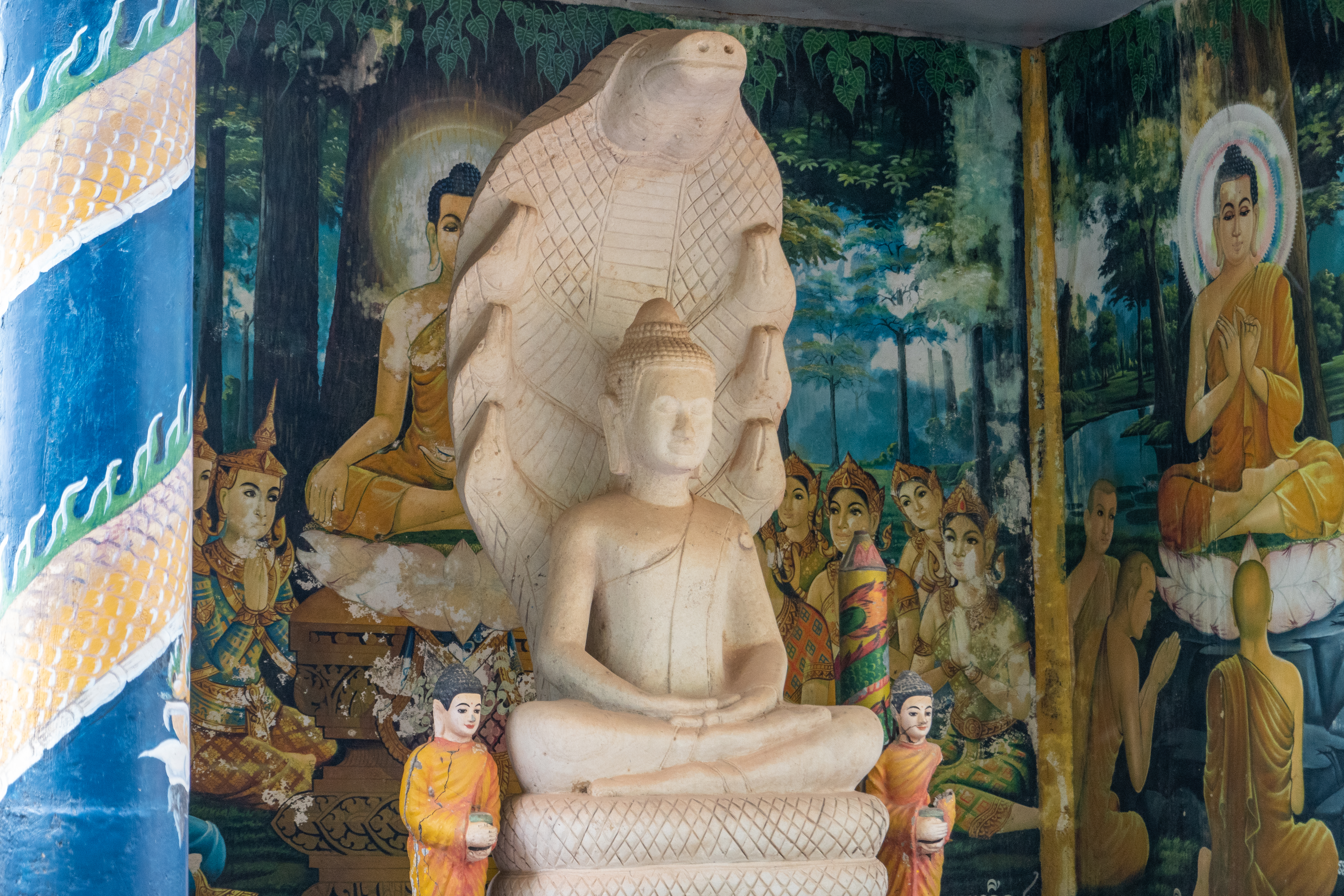
