= Kampot pepper crab =

Cambodian stir fry seafood dish

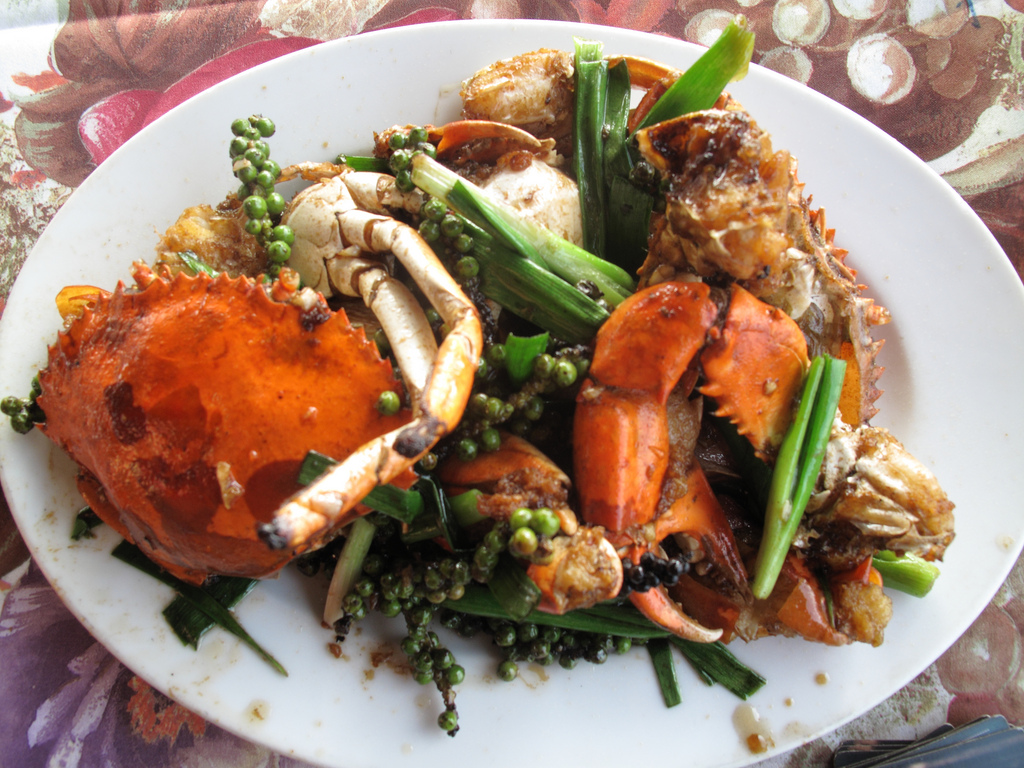
- Type: Stir-fry
- Course: Main
- Place of origin: Cambodia
- Region or state: Kampot and Kep
- Created by: Cambodian cuisine
- Serving temperature: Hot
- Main ingredients: Crab, garlic, palm sugar, spring onions, fish sauce and green Kampot peppercorns

Kampot pepper crab (Khmer: ឆាក្តាមម្រេច) is a Khmer dish made by stir-frying crab with garlic, palm sugar, spring onions, fish sauce and green Kampot peppercorns, a regional specialty of Kampot and Kep.

== Variations ==
If fresh green peppercorns are unavailable, they can be substituted with brined green peppercorns. Sometimes coarsely ground black pepper is used instead of green peppercorns. In other seafood variations, crab can be replaced with squid or shrimp.
