= Compote (disambiguation) =

Compote is a dessert made of whole or pieces of fruit in sugar syrup.

Compote may also refer to:

- Compote (game dish), a stewed game meat dish
- Kompot, a punch-like fruit drink in parts of Europe, and also a slang term for a crude preparation of heroin

== See also ==
- Kampot (disambiguation)
