= Popokvil Waterfalls =

Cambodian waterfall

Coordinates: 10.6304°N 104.0510°E

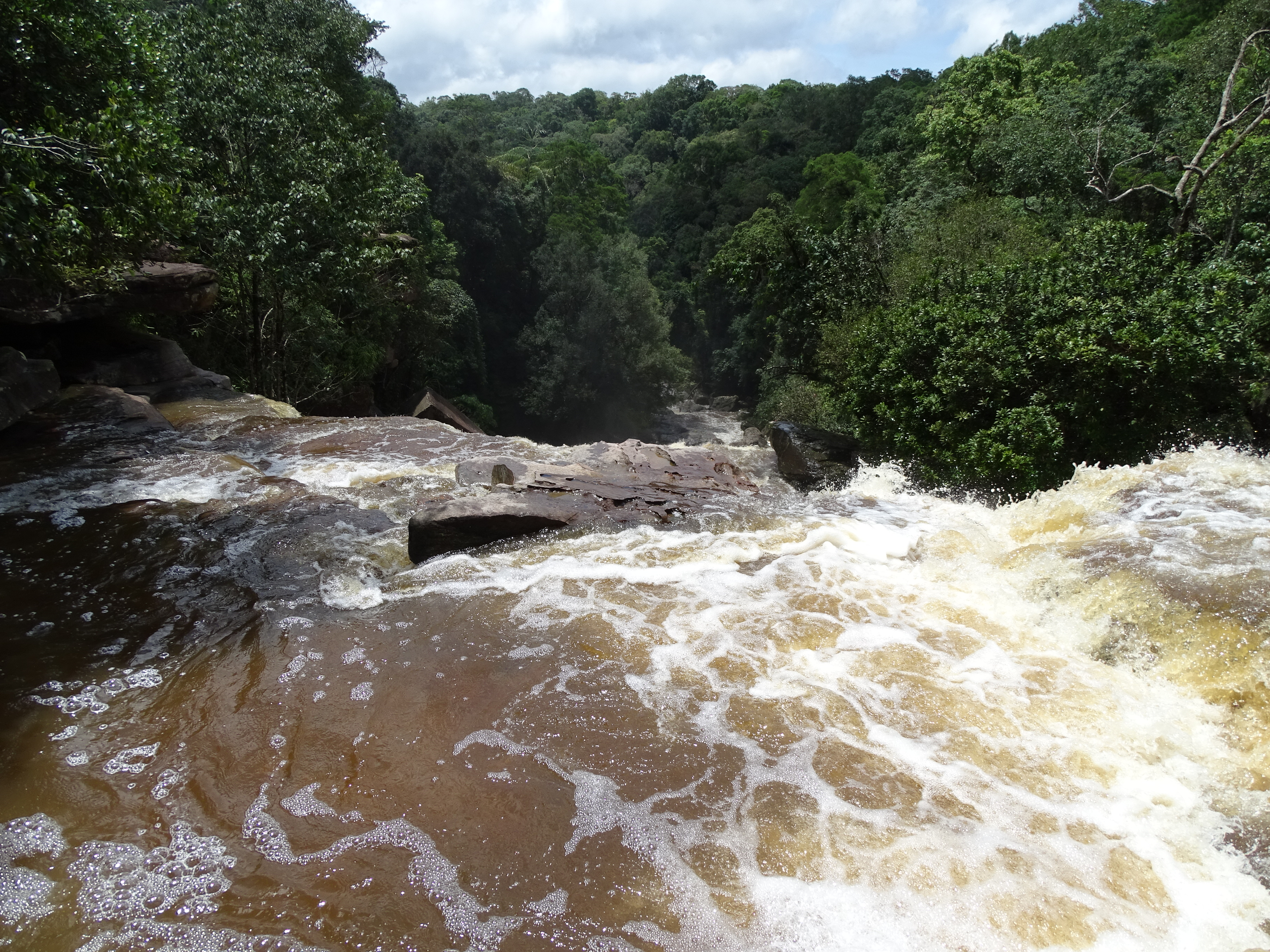
Popokvil Waterfall

Popokvil Waterfalls is a waterfall in Kampot Province, Cambodia. It is located about 3 miles (4.8 km) north-east of Bokor Hill Station. It is a two-tiered fall, with a shallow pool in between.
