= Kampot pepper =

Cultivar of piper nigrum grown in Cambodia

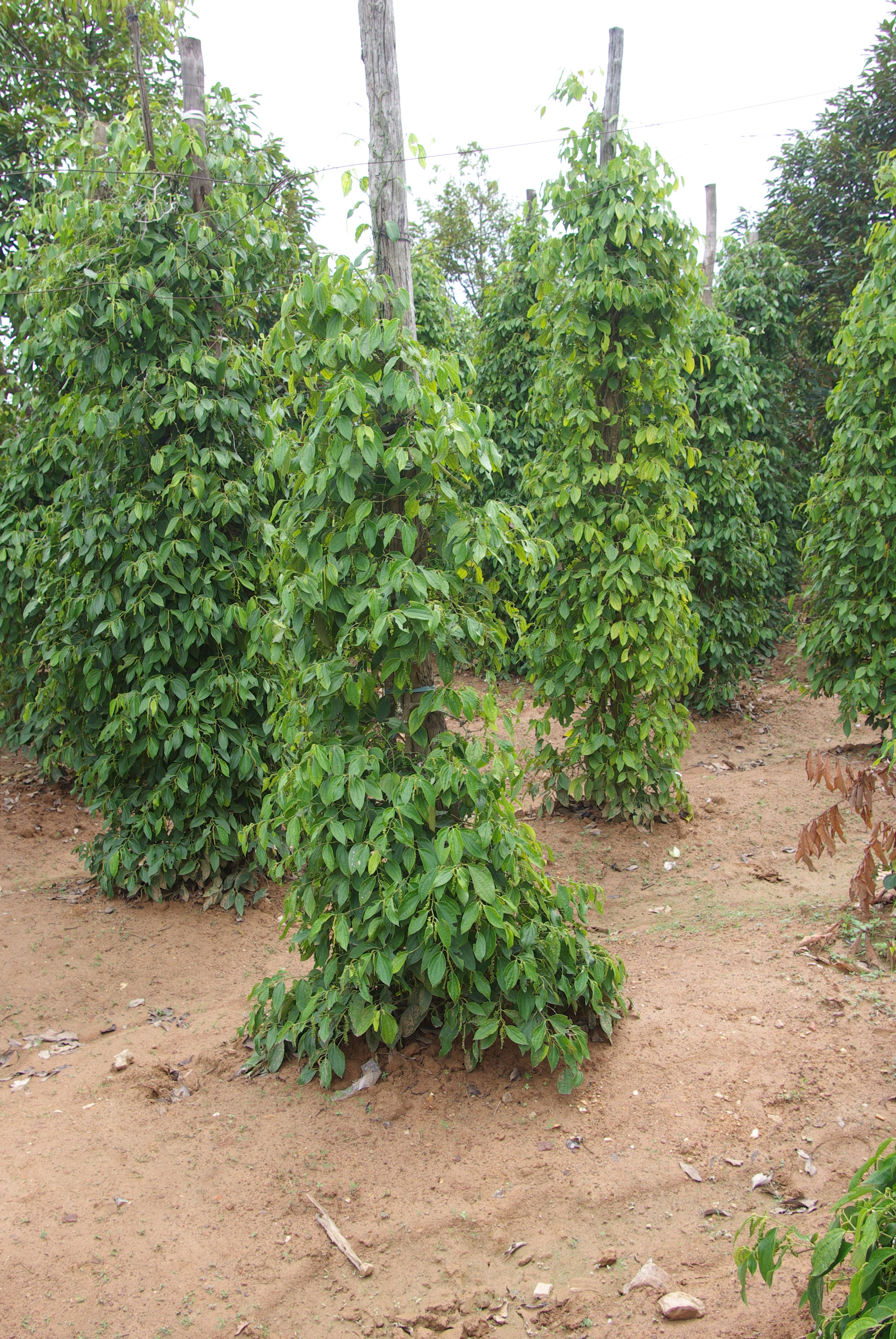
- Kampot pepper plants
- Genus: Piper
- Species: P. nigrum
- Cultivar: Kampot pepper
- Origin: pre-13th century

Kampot pepper (Khmer: ម្រេចកំពត, mrech Kampot; French: poivre de Kampot) is a cultivar of black pepper (Piper nigrum) grown and produced in Cambodia. During the early 20th century under the French protectorate within French Indochina it was also known as Indochinese pepper (French: poivre d'Indochine; Khmer: ម្រេចឥណ្ឌូចិន, mrech Indauchen). The pepper's modern name is derived from the area where it is grown, the Province of Kampot, but its historic name uses the French term for Mainland Southeast Asia. Kampot peppers are similar to many other species of Piper.

Kampot pepper is a certified geographical indication (GI) product in Cambodia (since 2010) and in European Union (since 2016). There are two varieties: the small leaf (កំចាយ, kamchay) and the big leaf variety (lampong or belantoeung).

== Production ==
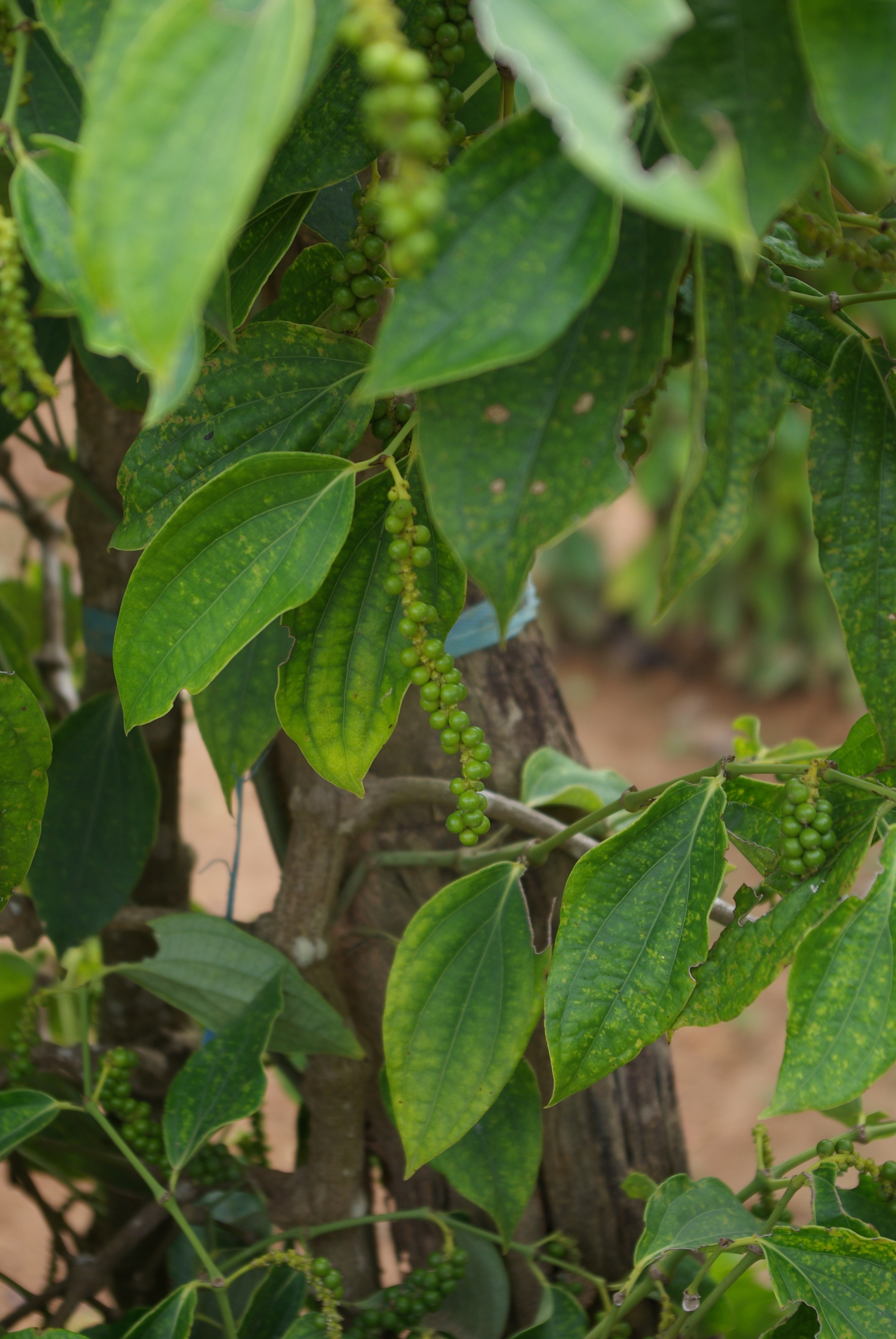
Green peppercorns growing on a vine

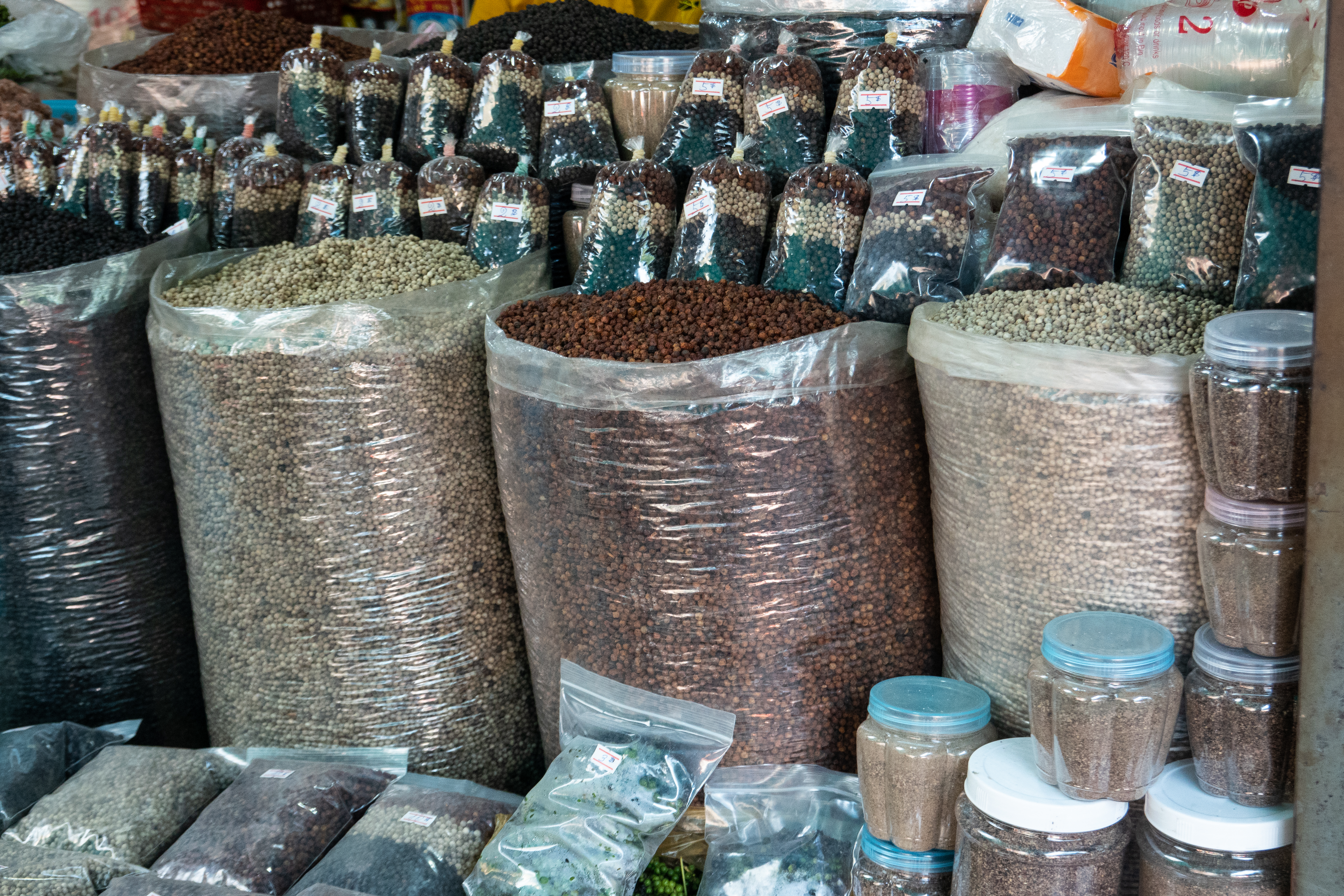
Black, white and red Kampot pepper for sale at the Kep Crab Market

Kampot pepper is grown, produced and sold in green, black, white and red varieties, all from the same plant. The climate of Kampot Province offers perfect conditions for growing pepper and the quartz content of the soil in the foothills of the Elephant Mountains helps to give Kampot pepper its unique terroir.

The growing conditions are only one of several elements of importance to the production of Kampot pepper. Knowledge of pepper cultivation and production has been handed down from generation to generation in Kampot Province since at least the 13th century. Storage conditions are also of importance and different qualities of Kampot pepper are produced and sold.

Plantations are inspected by the Kampot Pepper Producers Association (KPPA) and by the independent certification body Eco-Cert. Only accredited members of the KPPA, adhering to the PGI criteria, are authorised to sell pepper using the “Kampot Pepper” appellation of origin.

In 2016, at the end of May, Cambodia had produced a total of 11,819 tonnes of black pepper, an increase of 20% compared to the same period of 2015. About 72% of that came from Tbong Khmum, which has over 2,762 hectares of pepper farmland. Comparably, Vietnam tops the list of pepper growing nations with a total crop of 155,000 tons in 2014; a 38.6% share of the global production.

The world market price for pepper is currently favourable and many new pepper plantations are constructed across the country. In some regions, large pepper plantations are contributing to the already alarming deforestation in Cambodia.

== Geographical area ==
Kampot pepper is grown in seven districts/cities in two southwestern provinces of Cambodia.

Kampot Province

- Kampong Trach
- Dang Tong
- Tuek Chhou
- Chhouk
- Kampot City

Kep Province

- Kep City
- Damnak Chang'aeur

== History ==
Kampot pepper cultivation has a long history and was first described in the 13th century, during the Angkorian era, when the Chinese diplomat Zhou Daguan visited the area. Modern intensive production was initiated under the French colonial rule in the 1870s and at the beginning of the 20th century, Cambodia harvested around 8,000 tons of Kampot pepper annually. In the 1960s, there were still 1 million pepper poles in Kampot, producing around 3,000 tons per year, but the production was severely affected by the Cambodian Civil War and only 4 tons per year were harvested by the end of the 1990s.

Kampot pepper production slowly gained momentum in the 2000s when previous pepper farmers gradually returned to their lands. As of July 2015, six districts in the southern province of Kampot have pepper farms, while the spice's overseas market consists mostly of Europe, the United States, Japan, Korea, and Taiwan. As the first Cambodian product, Kampot pepper obtained the World Trade Organization's Geographical Indication (GI) status in 2010, tying the quality of the product to its origin. International demand for the product has risen since then. However, annual export volume is still relatively small, i.e. 58 tonnes was produced on 25 hectares for the year 2014. In 2020, the total production of Kampot pepper had reached around 80 tonnes.

== Use ==
Squid stir-fry, using Kampot green peppercorns for both seasoning and garnish

Ground black pepper or green peppercorns are used for the signature Kampot Pepper Crab, where they are stir-fried in sweetened soy sauce with garlic and crab meat. An alternative recipe features green peppercorns stir-fried with squid and garlic in a mix of palm sugar, oyster sauce and fish sauce. Samai Distillery in Phnom Penh uses red Kampot pepper from La Plantation in its Kampot Pepper Rum. To'ak Chocolate makes Kampot Pepper Aged Signature Dark Chocolate from the Nacional cocoa beans and red Kampot pepper.

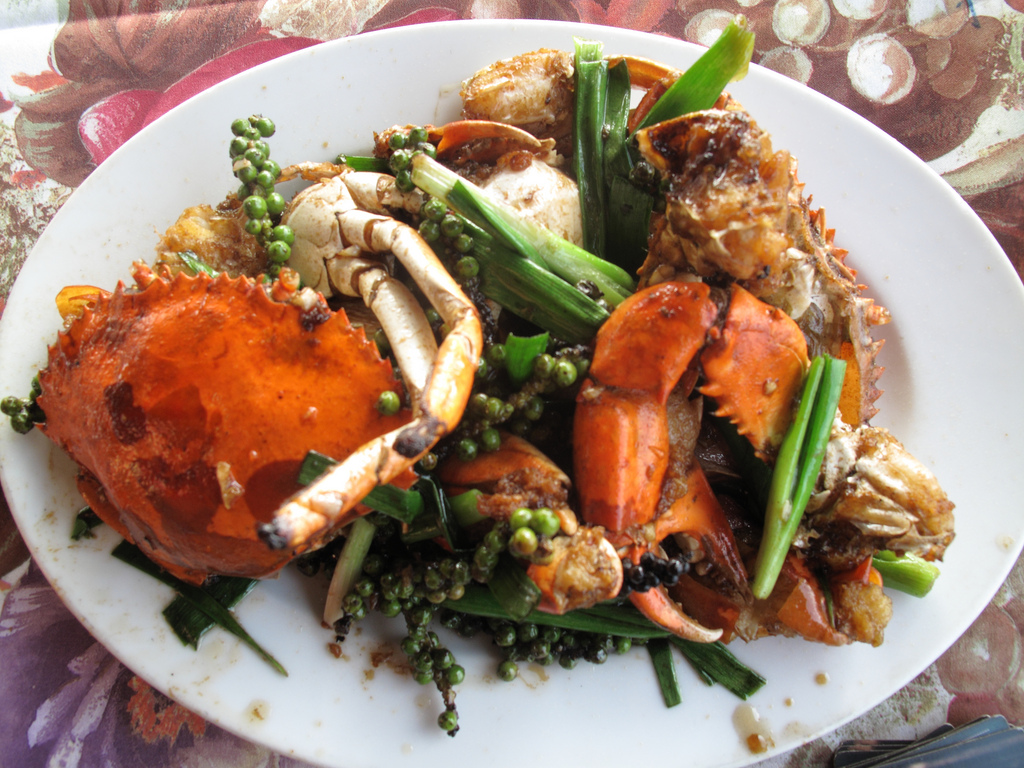
Kampot Pepper Crab featuring green Kampot peppercorns, garlic and spring onion.

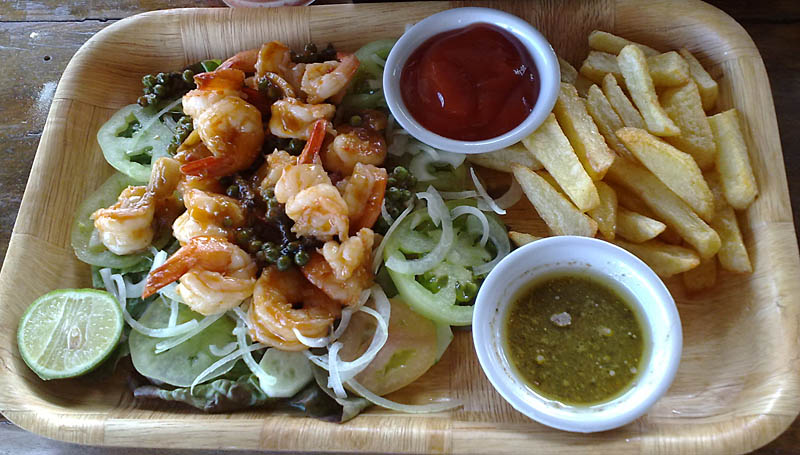
Cambodian prawns with green Kampot peppercorns.

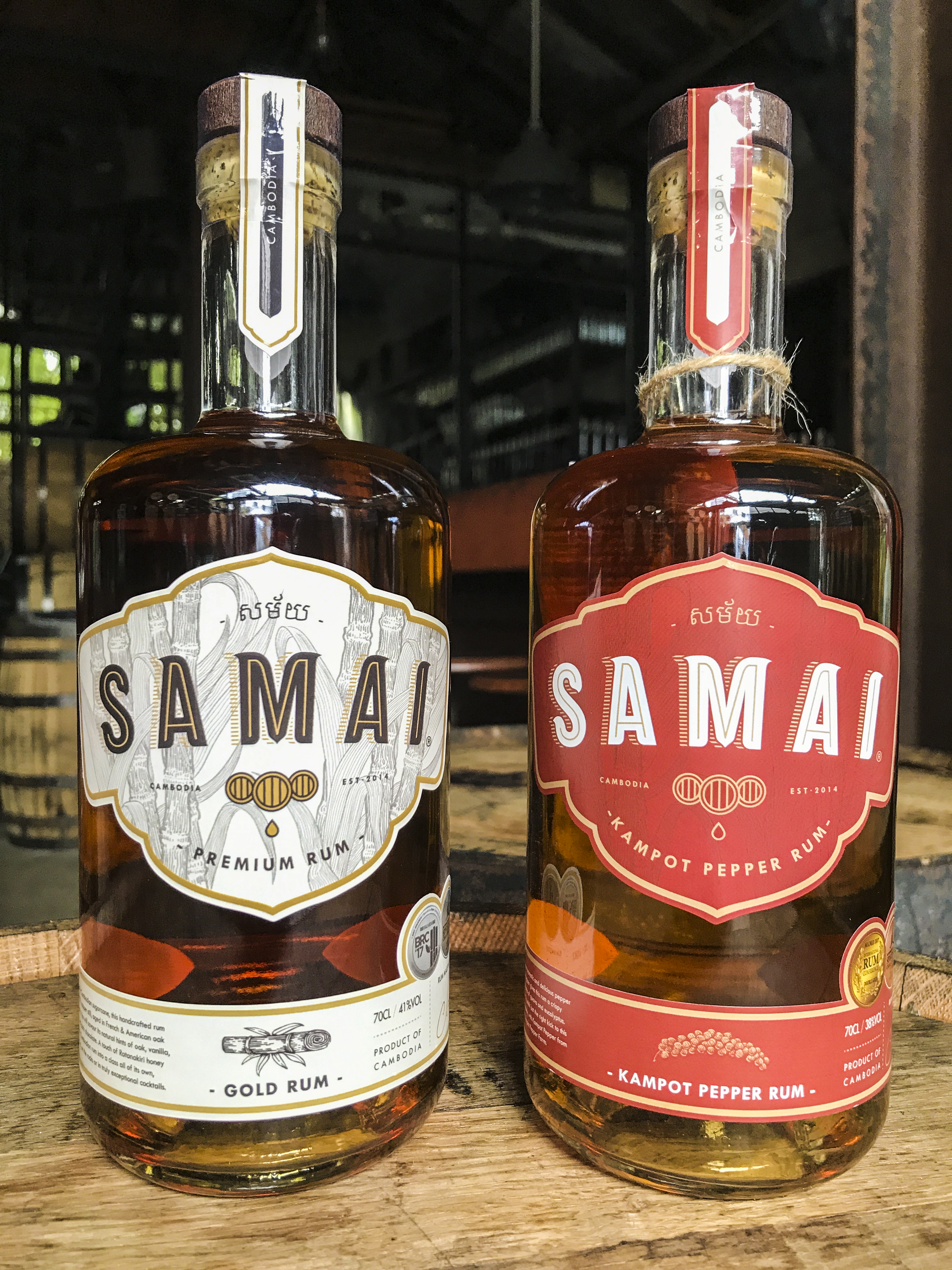
Kampot Pepper Rum spiced with red Kampot pepper (right) produced by Samai Distillery.

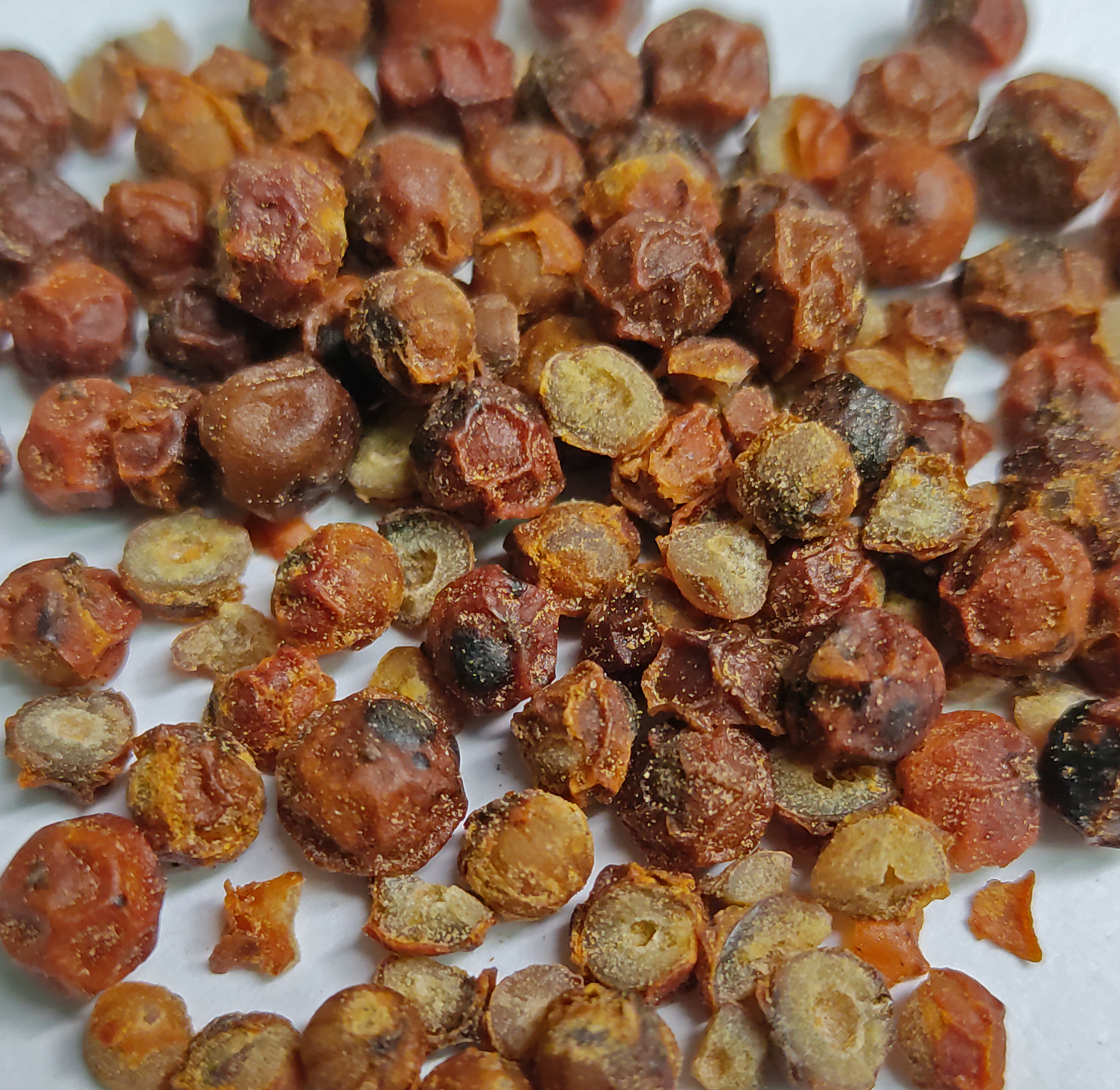
Dried red Kampot peppercorns.
