= Samai Distillery =

Cambodian rum manufacturer

Samai Rum Distillery
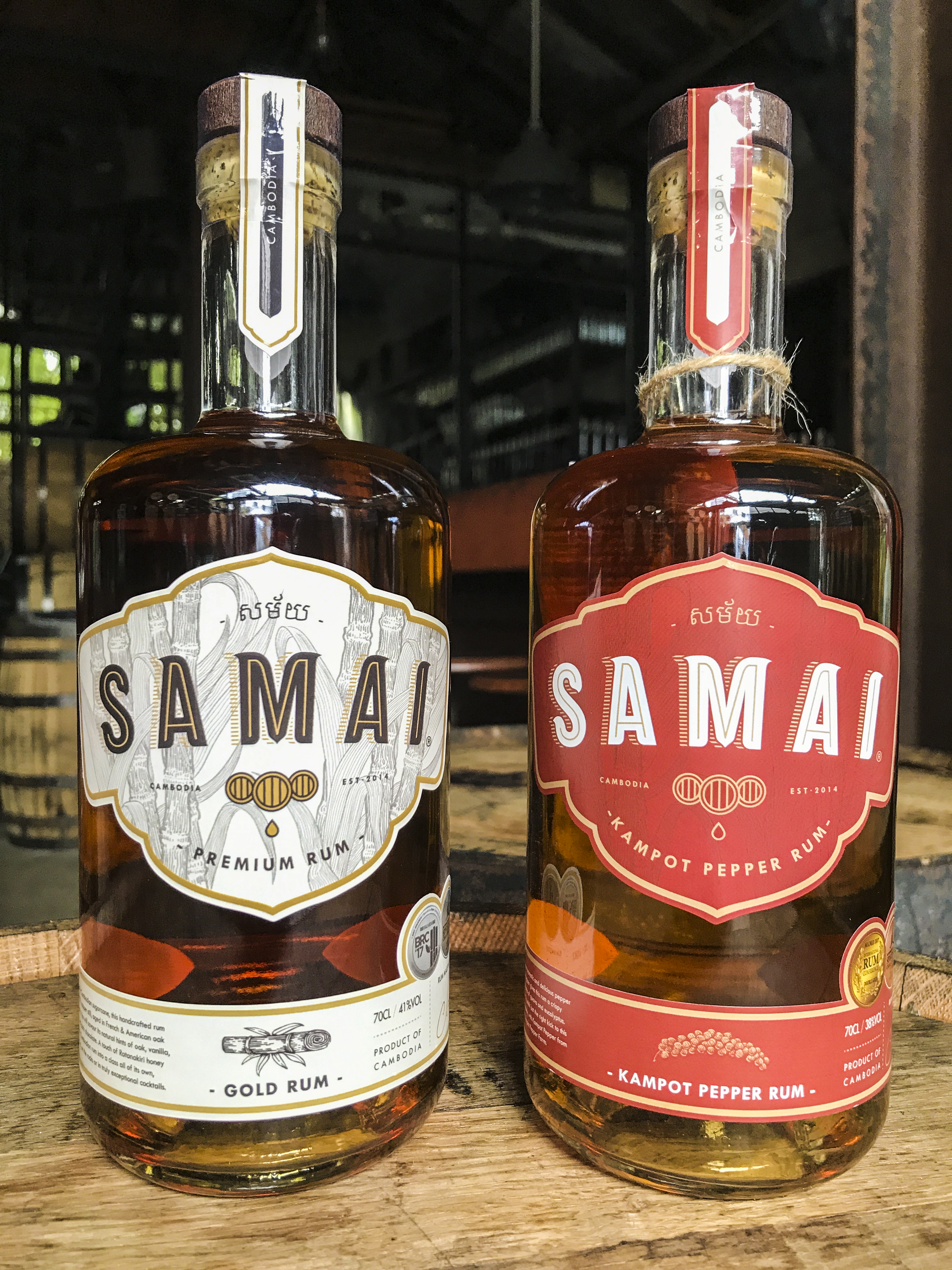
- Samai Gold Rum (left) and Samai Kampot Pepper Rum (right)
- Industry: Distilled beverages
- Founded: 2014
- Founders: Diego Wilkins, Daniel Pacheco and Antonio Lopez
- Headquarters: Phnom Penh, Cambodia
- Key people: Moang Darachampich (master distiller)
- Products: Rum
- Production output: 500 bottles/month (2018)
- Number of employees: 16 (2018)
- Website: samaidistillery.com

Samai Rum Distillery (Khmer: សិប្បកម្មកែច្នៃស្រារ៉ោមសម័យ) is a Cambodian premium rum manufacturer in Phnom Penh founded in 2014. The first rum distillery in the country, it was founded by Diego Wilkins, Daniel Pacheco and Antonio Lopez.

Samai Distillery was selected as one of 10 startup distilleries for Diageo's distillery incubation programme. Since then, its rums have won numerous awards from across the world such as San Francisco World Spirits Competition, the London International Spirits Challenge, the Singapore World Spirits Competition and the Miami International Rum Conference. Currently, the distillery exports around 30% of its production to Singapore, France and Spain, while the remaining 70% is sold domestically.

In 2020, after the start of the COVID-19 pandemic, Samai Distillery began producing hand sanitizer from the distillation fraction previously used for disinfecting equipment.

== Production ==
Samai Distillery produces añejo rum using traditional handmade 500-litre copper pot stills. It sources its sugarcane from eastern regions of the Koh Kong Province to produce three kinds of rums – Samai Gold Rum flavoured with Mondulkiri wild honey, Samai PX Limited Edition Rum aged in Sherry American oak barrels and Kampot Pepper Rum spiced with Kampot pepper.
