= Bokor Municipality =

Bokor Municipality ក្រុងបូកគោ Krong Bokor
- Municipality
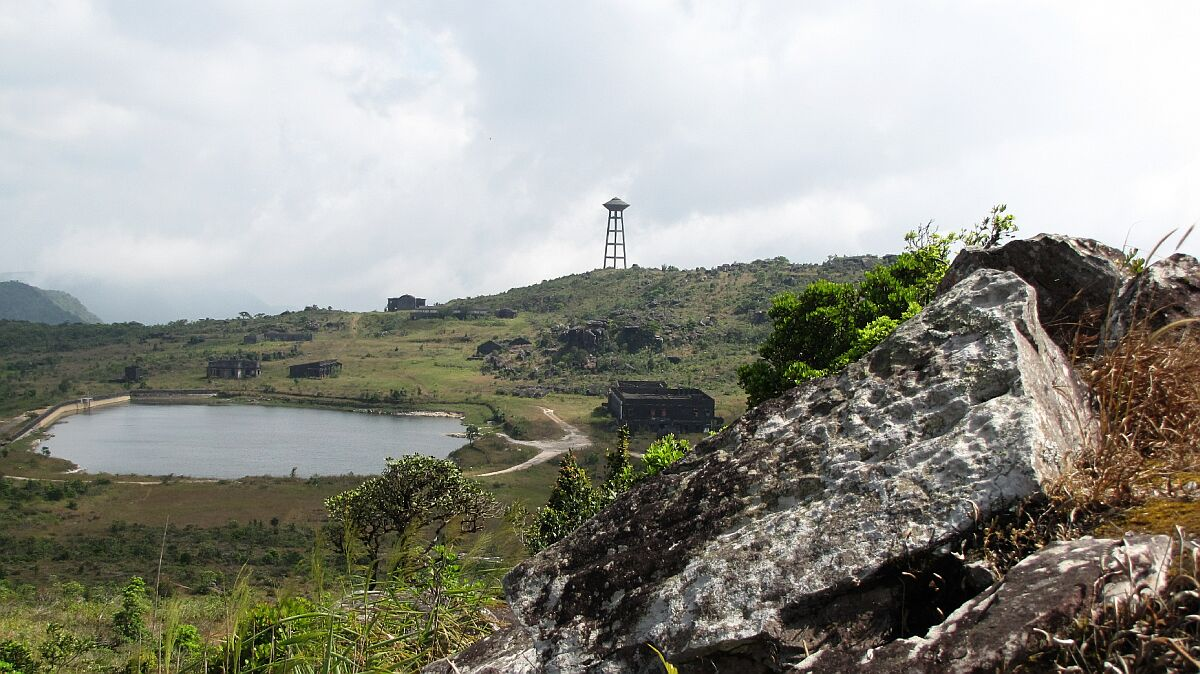
- Bokor's Plateau

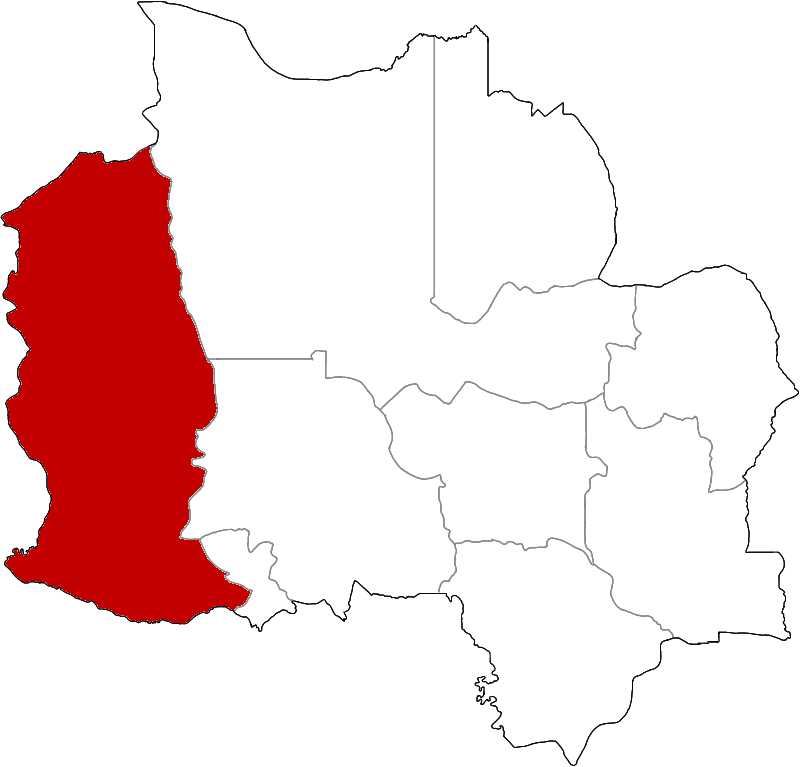
- Municipality location in Kampot Province
- Country: Cambodia
- Province: Kampot
- Quarters: 3
- Villages: 11
- Established: 16 March 2021

Government
  - Type: City municipality
  - Mayor: Ngin Phalroth (CPP)

Population (2021)
  - Total: 23,000
- Time zone: UTC+7 (ICT)
- Geocode: 0707
- Website: https://kampot.gov.kh

The Bokor Municipality (Khmer: ក្រុងបូកគោ) is a municipality in Kampot province, in southern Cambodia. One of the provincial cities is located within the municipality.

== Communes and villages ==
Communes and Villages of Bokor Municipality
| Postal Code | Sangkat (Quarters) | Romanization | Phum (Villages) | Romanization |
| 070901 | សង្កាត់បឹងទូក | Sangkat Boeng Touk | រលួស | Roluos |
| 070901 | សង្កាត់បឹងទូក | Sangkat Boeng Touk | កែបថ្មី | Kaeb Thmei |
| 070901 | សង្កាត់បឹងទូក | Sangkat Boeng Touk | ទទឹងថ្ងៃ | Totueng Thngai |
| 070902 | សង្កាត់កោះតូច | Sangkat Koah Touch | គីឡូ១២ | Kilo 12 |
| 070902 | សង្កាត់កោះតូច | Sangkat Koah Touch | ព្រែកចេក | Preaek Chek |
| 070902 | សង្កាត់កោះតូច | Sangkat Koah Touch | កណ្តាល | Kandal |
| 070902 | សង្កាត់កោះតូច | Sangkat Koah Touch | ព្រែកអំពិល | Preak Ampil |
| 070903 | សង្កាត់ព្រែកត្នោត | Sangkat Preak Tnoat | ត្រពាំងរពៅ | Trapeang Ropov |
| 070903 | សង្កាត់ព្រែកត្នោត | Sangkat Preak Tnoat | ព្រែកក្រែង | Preaek Kraeng |
| 070903 | សង្កាត់ព្រែកត្នោត | Sangkat Preak Tnoat | ព្រែកត្នោត | Preaek Tnoat |
| 070903 | សង្កាត់ព្រែកត្នោត | Sangkat Preak Tnoat | ចង្អោន | Changhoan |
