= Tuek Chhou district =

Tuek Chhou ស្រុកទឹកឈូ
- District (srok)
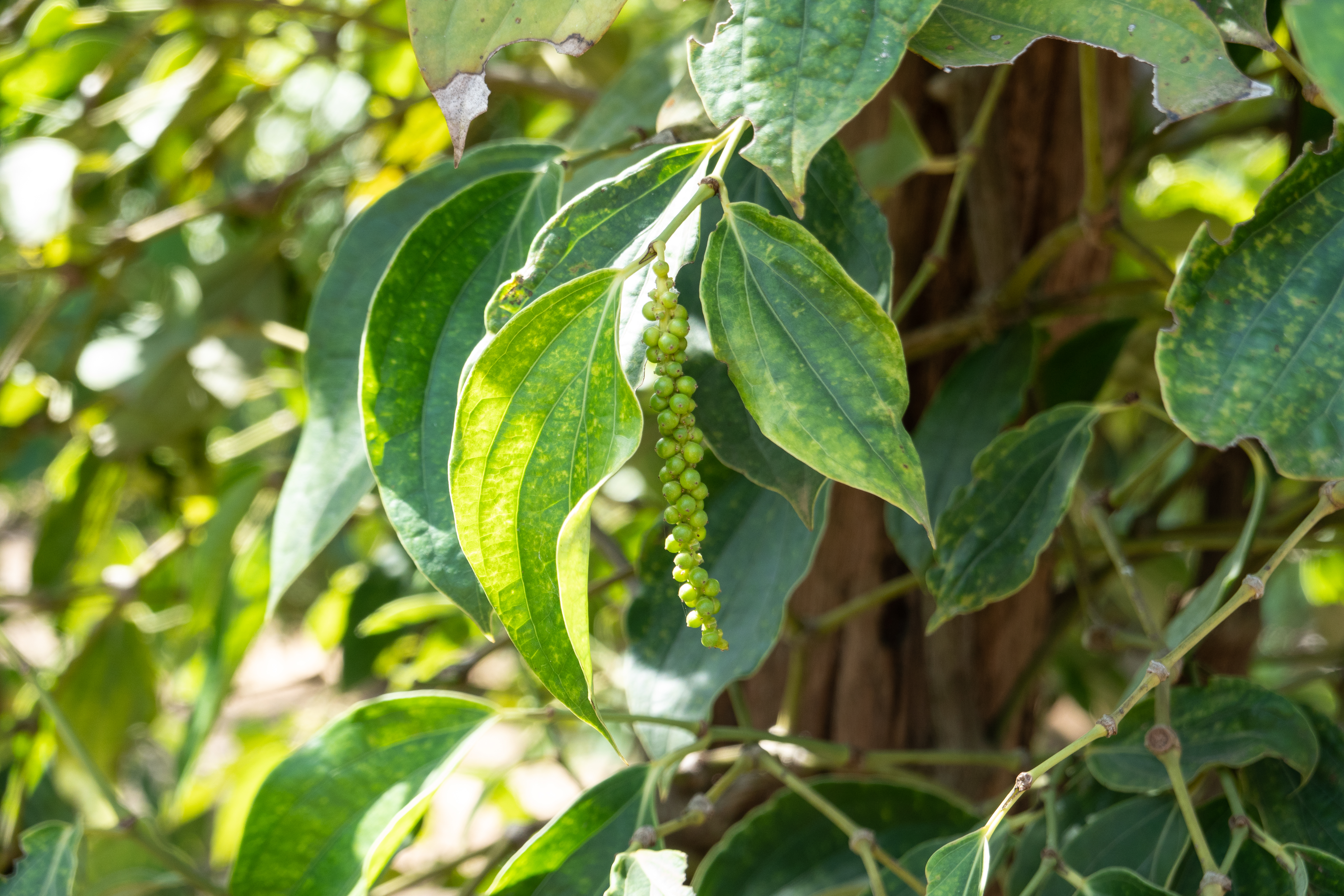

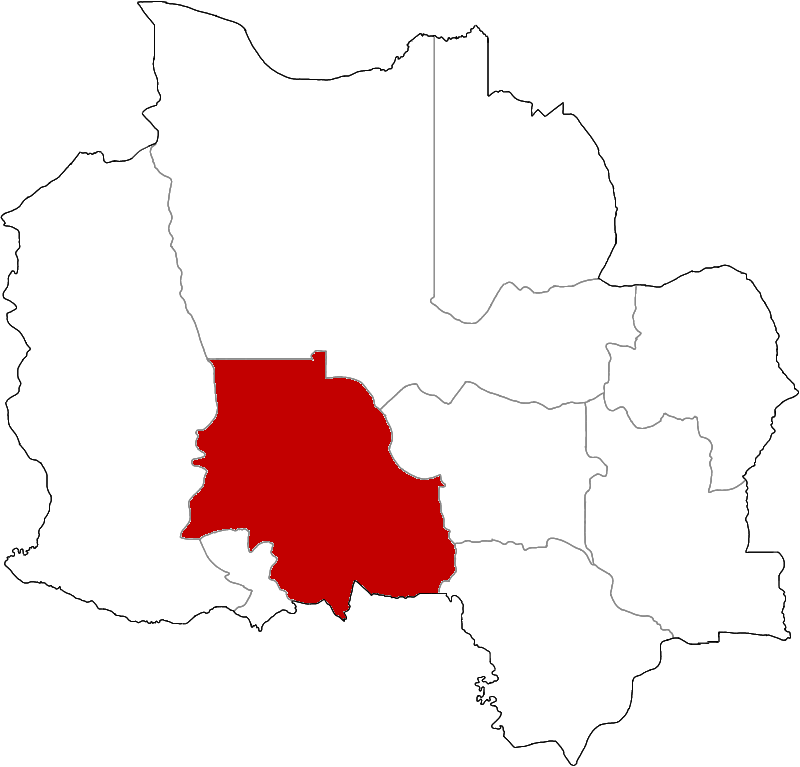
- District location in Kampot province
- Coordinates: 10°36′N 104°10′E
- Country: Cambodia
- Province: Kampot
- Communes: 19
- Villages: 67

Government
  - Type: District
  - Governor: Im Chansothon

Population (1998)
  - Total: 89,779
- Time zone: UTC+7 (ICT)
- Geocode: 0707

Tuek Chhou (Khmer: ស្រុកទឹកឈូ) is a district located in Kampot province, in southern Cambodia. It surrounds Krong Kampot some part, which contains the urban area of Kampot City.

== Administration ==
Khum (communes)	Phum (villages)	Geocode
Chum Kriel	Trapeang Thum, Chum Kriel, Samraong, Kampong Kandal	070702
Kampong Kraeng	Makprang, Andoung Chi Meun, Prey Tnaot, Kampong Kraeng, kampongkrong	070703
Kampong Samraong	Trapeang Kanhchhaet, Kampong Samraong Khang Cheung, Kampong Samraong Khang Tboung	070704
Kandaol	Phnum Touch, Anlong Kokir, Tuek Kraham, Mean Ritth, Damnaktrach	070705
Koun Satv	Bos Nhinh, Koun Sat, Kampong Nong, Kampong Tnaot	070708
Makprang	Snam Prampir, Bat Kbal Damrei, Mortpeam, Meakprang	070709
Prey Khmum	Prey Tom, Boeng Ta Rung, Prey Khmum, Voat Angk	070712
Prey Thnang	Chakkrei Ting, Damnak Luong, Prey Thnang, Tvear Thmei, Chbaampov	070713
Stueng Kaev	Kampong Chen, Trapeang Kak, Doung, Mlich Kol, Anlong Meakprang	070715
Thmei	Trasek Kaong, Trapeang Chrab, Thmei, Voat Pou, Donsoy, Kochenleng	070716
Trapeang Pring	Trapeang Pring Khang Cheung, Trapeang Pring Khang Tboung, Bos Trabaek, Angk	070717
Trapeang Sangkae	Trapeang Sangkae, Kampong Kes, Trapeang Thum	070718
Trapeang Thum	Trapeang Chrey, Krang, Trapeang Thum, Svay Thum	070719
