= Angkor Chey District =

Angkor Chey ស្រុកអង្គរជ័យ អង្គរជ័យ
- District (srok)
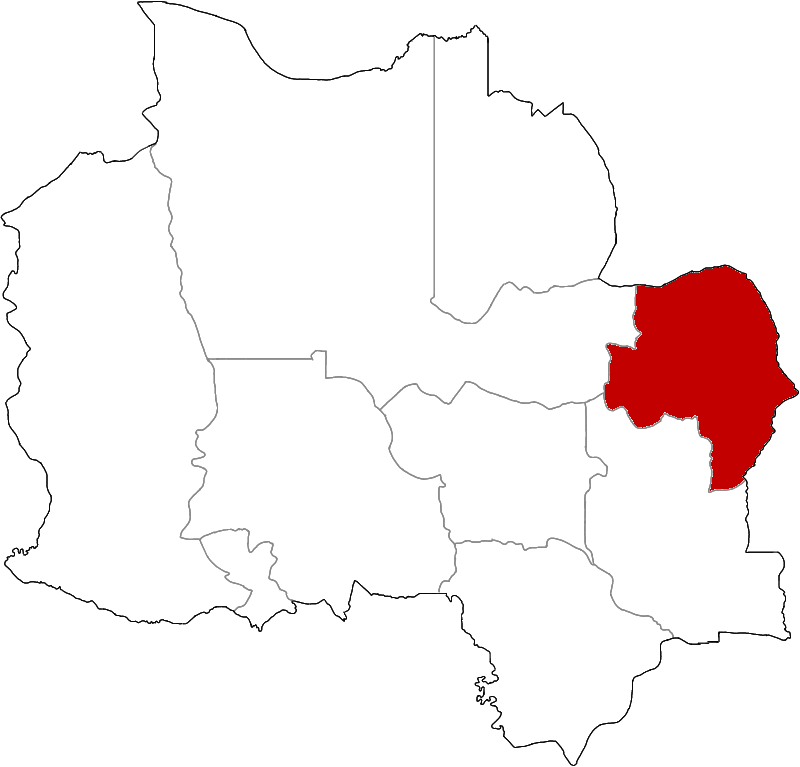
- District location in Kampot Province
- Coordinates: 10°46′N 104°39′E
- Country: Cambodia
- Province: Kampot
- Communes: 11
- Villages: 79

Population (1998)
  - Total: 72,459
- Time zone: +7
- Geocode: 0701

Angkor Chey District (Khmer: ស្រុកអង្គរជ័យ) is a district located in Kampot Province, in southern Cambodia.
