= Chum Kiri District =

Chum Kiri ស្រុកជុំគីរី
- District (srok)
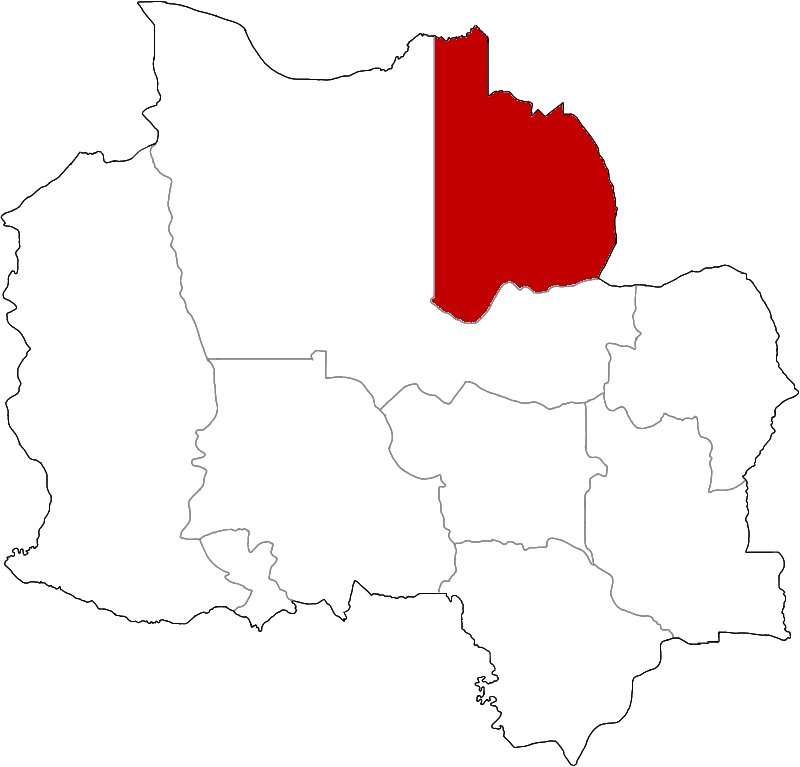
- District location in Kampot Province
- Coordinates: 10°51′N 104°24′E
- Country: Cambodia
- Province: Kampot
- Communes: 7
- Villages: 37

Population (1998)
  - Total: 39,320
- Time zone: +7
- Geocode: 0704

Chum Kiri District (Khmer: ស្រុកជុំគីរី) is a district located in Kampot Province, in southern Cambodia.
