= Preah Monivong National Park =

National park in Cambodia

Preah Monivong Bokor National Park
- Khmer: ឧទ្យានជាតិព្រះមុនីវង្ស បូកគោ; Ŭtyian Chiat Preăh Mŭnivǒng Bokko, [ʔut.jiən ciət preəh muniː.ʋɔŋ ɓoː.koː]
- IUCN category II (national park)
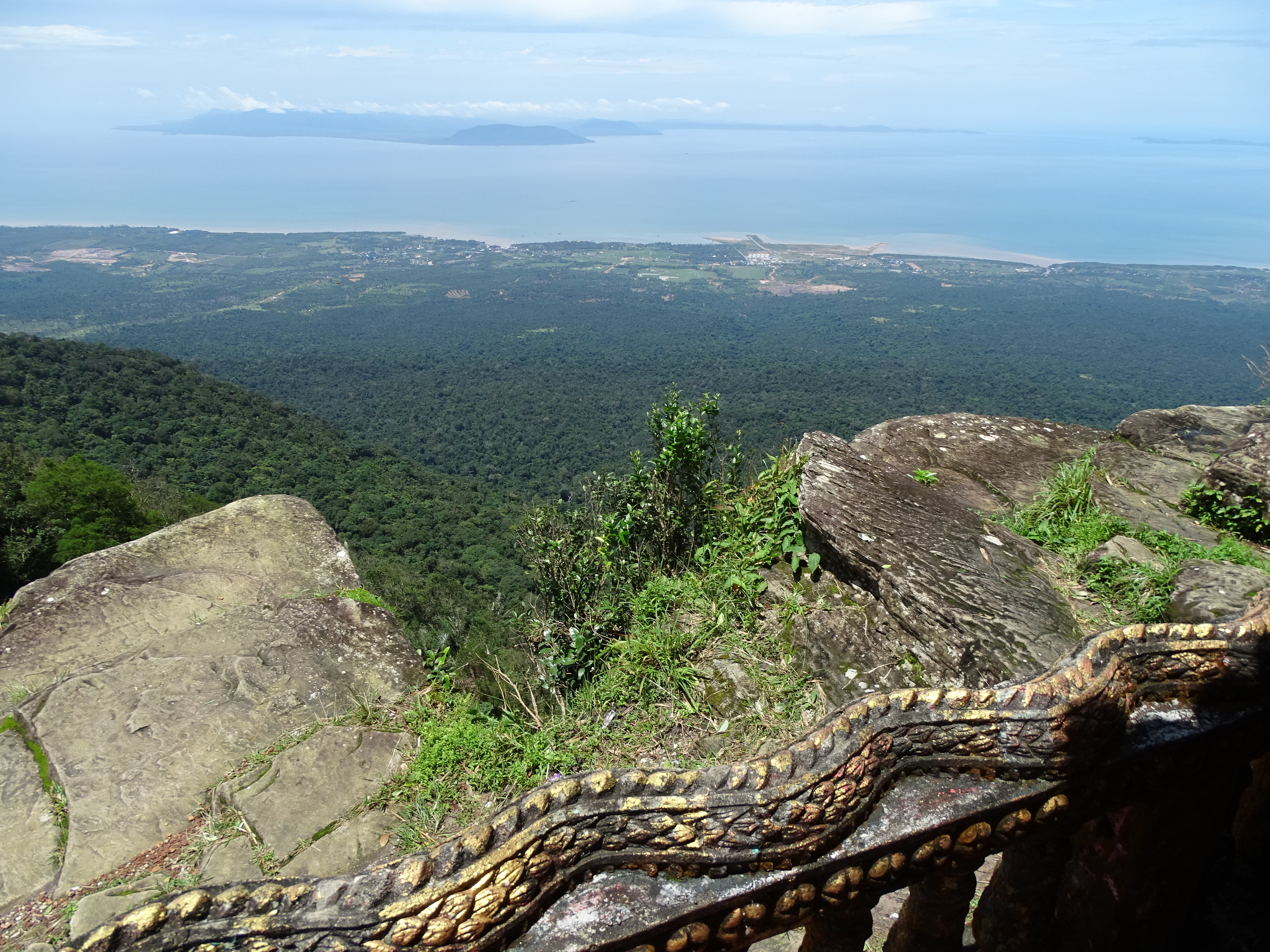
- View from Wat Sampov Pram

- Location within Cambodia
- Location: Kampot Province, Cambodia
- Nearest city: Bokor
- Coordinates: 10°51′43″N 104°01′56″E
- Area: 1,544.58 km^{2} (596.37 sq mi)
- Established: 1993
- Governing body: Ministry of Environment

Preah Monivong Bokor National Park is a national park in Kampot Province in southern Cambodia. It was established in 1993 and covers 1,544.58 km^{2} (596.37 sq mi). In 2003, it was designated as an ASEAN Heritage Park. It is located in the Dâmrei Mountains, forming the southeastern parts of the Cardamom Mountains. Most of the park is about 1,000 m (3,300 ft) and the highest peak is Phnom Bokor at 1,081 m (3,547 ft), also referred to as Bokor Mountain.

== History ==
The Dâmrei Mountains was formerly a Khmer Rouge controlled area, but in 1993, Preah Monivong National Park was inaugurated along with most other national parks in Cambodia. It is one of two ASEAN Heritage Parks in the country.

Preah Monivong National Park is well known for the abandoned Bokor Hill Station, a remote settlement built by the French colonialists in 1921. They also built a Catholic church nearby in 1928, a very rare sight in Cambodia. The park is named after King Sisowath Monivong who used to visit the area and died here in 1941. Monivong ordered the construction of a Buddhist temple in the area in 1924. In 2010, a large statue of Lok Yeay Mao was constructed in the area. Lok Yeay Mao is a mythic heroine from Cambodian Buddhism and is said to protect travellers, hunters and fishing men. At 29 metres, it is the tallest Yeay Mao statue in the country.

The national park has become a tourist destination. In 2019, the government released a "Master Plan for Bokor City Development Project until 2035", by which 18,987 ha (73.31 mi^{2}) of the park are to be developed for residents, tourism, and businesses.

== Flora and fauna ==
Forest types in the park include dipterocarp, deciduous, tropical evergreen and mangrove forests. Burretiodendron hsienmu, a threatened species, is also found in the park. A study by the University of Maryland found that the park had lost about 9% of primary forest between 2001 and 2019, with deforestation continuing in 2020 and 2021. Park animal species include Asian elephant, pileated gibbon, gaur, banteng, large Indian civet, dhole and Asian black bear. Bird life includes chestnut-headed partridge and green peafowl.
