= Compote (game dish) =

Dish made from game meat

- Type: Stew
- Main ingredients: Game meats, roux, pearl onions, bacon

A compote is a dish made from game meat. Some examples of the game meat used are rabbit, partridge and pigeon. The meat is cooked in a roux for a long time over low heat along with pearl onions and bacon added at the end. The dish is cooked until the meat has a fine texture and has completely fallen from the bones.
