= Phnom Chhnork =

Hindu cave temple in Cambodia

Coordinates: 10.64278°N 104.27012°E

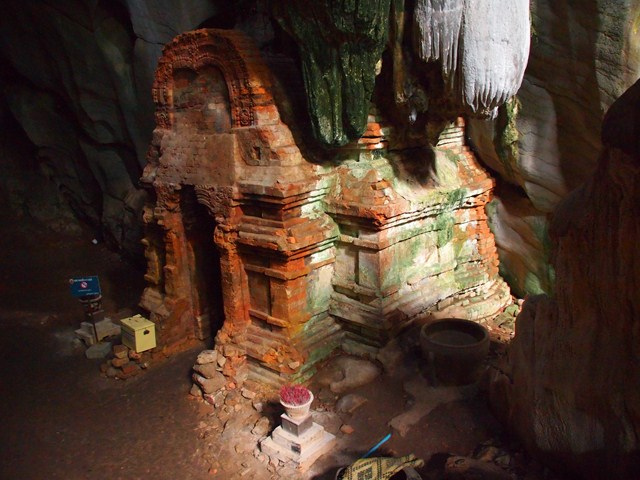
Phnom Chhnork.

Phnom Chhnork is a Hindu cave temple in Kampot Province, southern Cambodia, located about 5 miles (8.0 km) north-east of Kampot. The temple was built in the 7th century from Funan brick and is dedicated to Shiva. It is accessed via stone steps.
