= Kampot Municipality =

Kampot Municipality ក្រុងកំពត Krong Kampot
- Municipality
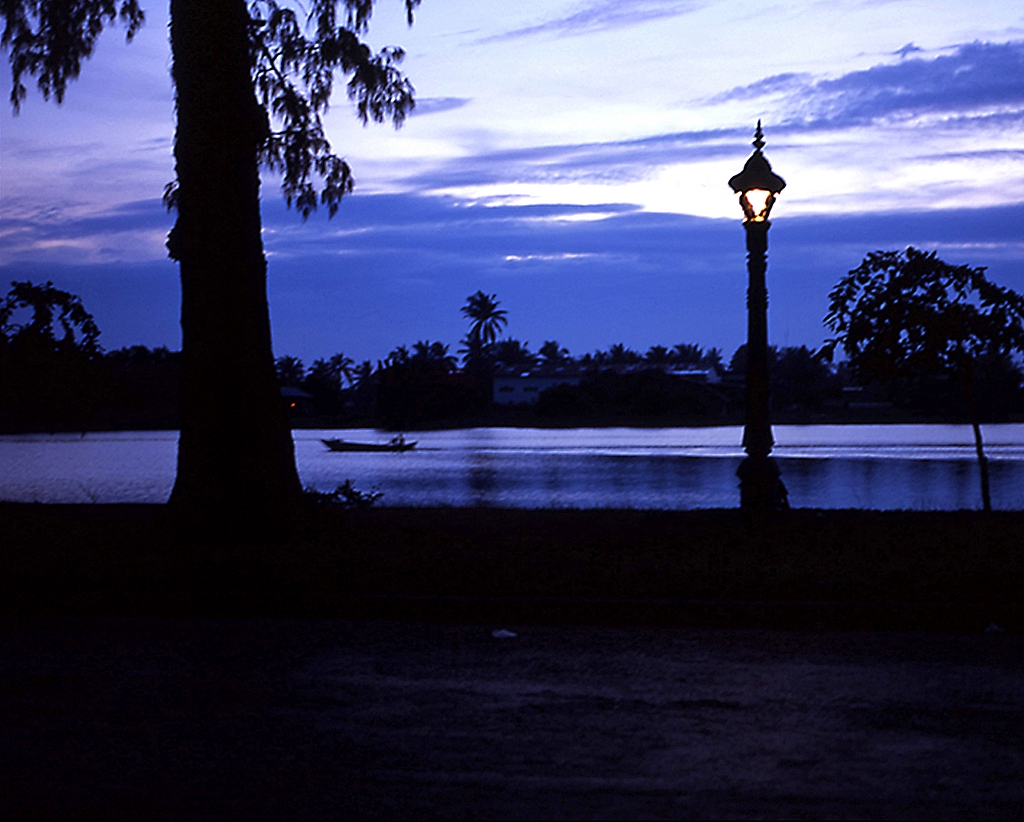
- Riverside Promenade

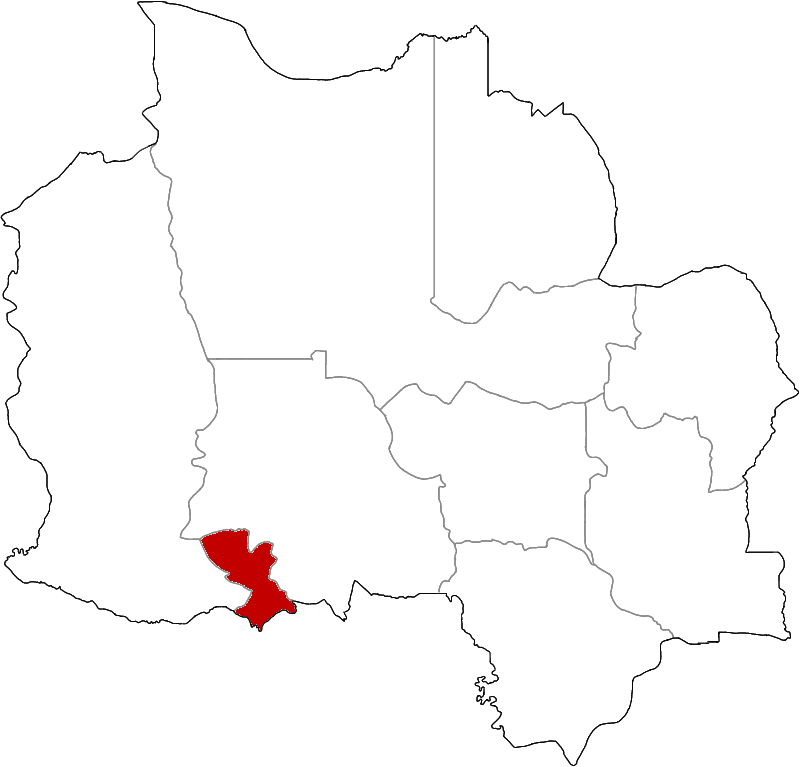
- Municipality location in Kampot Province
- Coordinates: 10°36′N 104°10′E
- Country: Cambodia
- Province: Kampot
- Quarters: 5
- Villages: 15

Government
  - Type: City-municipality
  - Mayor: Neak Sovannary

Population (2008)
  - Total: 36,367
- Time zone: UTC+7 (ICT)
- Geocode: 0708
- Website: kampot.gov.kh

The Kampot Municipality (Khmer: ក្រុងកំពត) is a municipality in Kampot Province, in southern Cambodia. The provincial capital Kampot is located within the municipality.

== Communes and villages ==
Sangkat (Quarters)	Phum (Villages)
Kampong Kandal	Sovann Sakor, Phum Muoy Ousaphie
Krang Ampil	Krang, Svay Thum
Kampong Bay	Kampong Bay Khang Cheung, Kampong Bay Khang Tboung, Bakoeng
Andoung Khmer	Tvi Khang Cheung, Tvi Khang Tboung, Ou Touch, Andoung Khmaer, Ta Deb
Ta Angk|Doun | Taok, Srae Boeng|Ta Pream
