= Kampot province =

Province of Cambodia

Kampot Province ខេត្តកំពត
- Province

Khmer transcription(s)
  - Khmer: ខេត្តកំពត
  - UNGEGN: Khaet Kǎmpôt
  - ALA-LC: Khett Kaṃbat
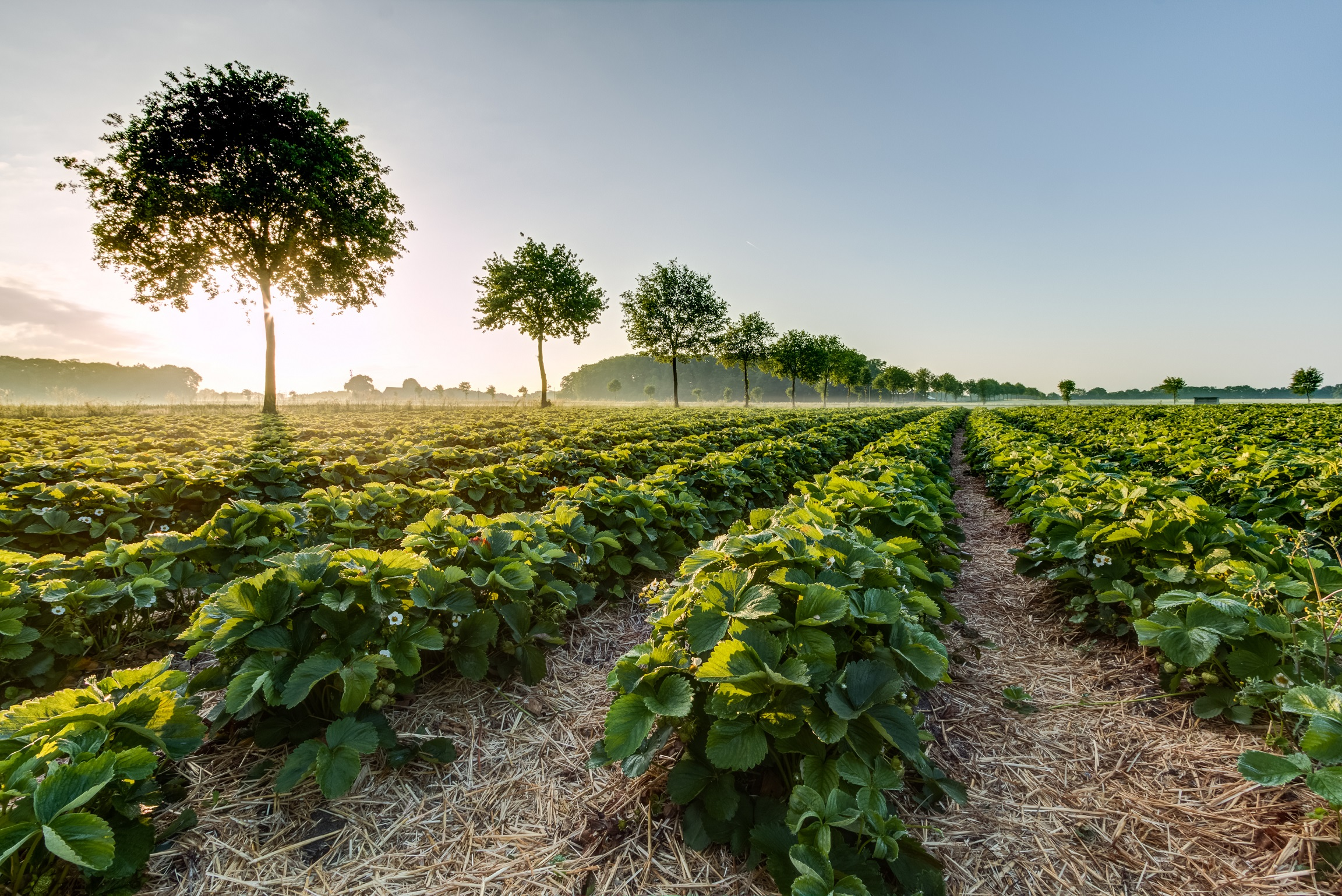
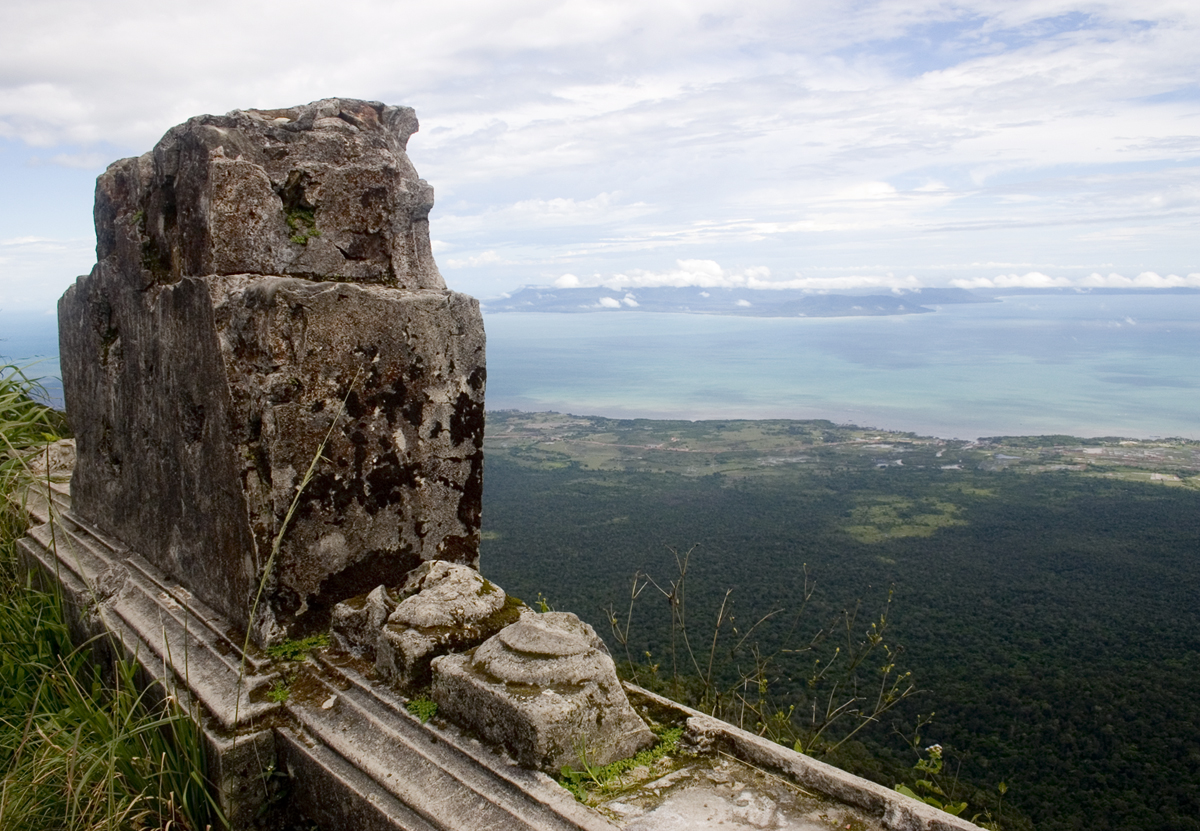
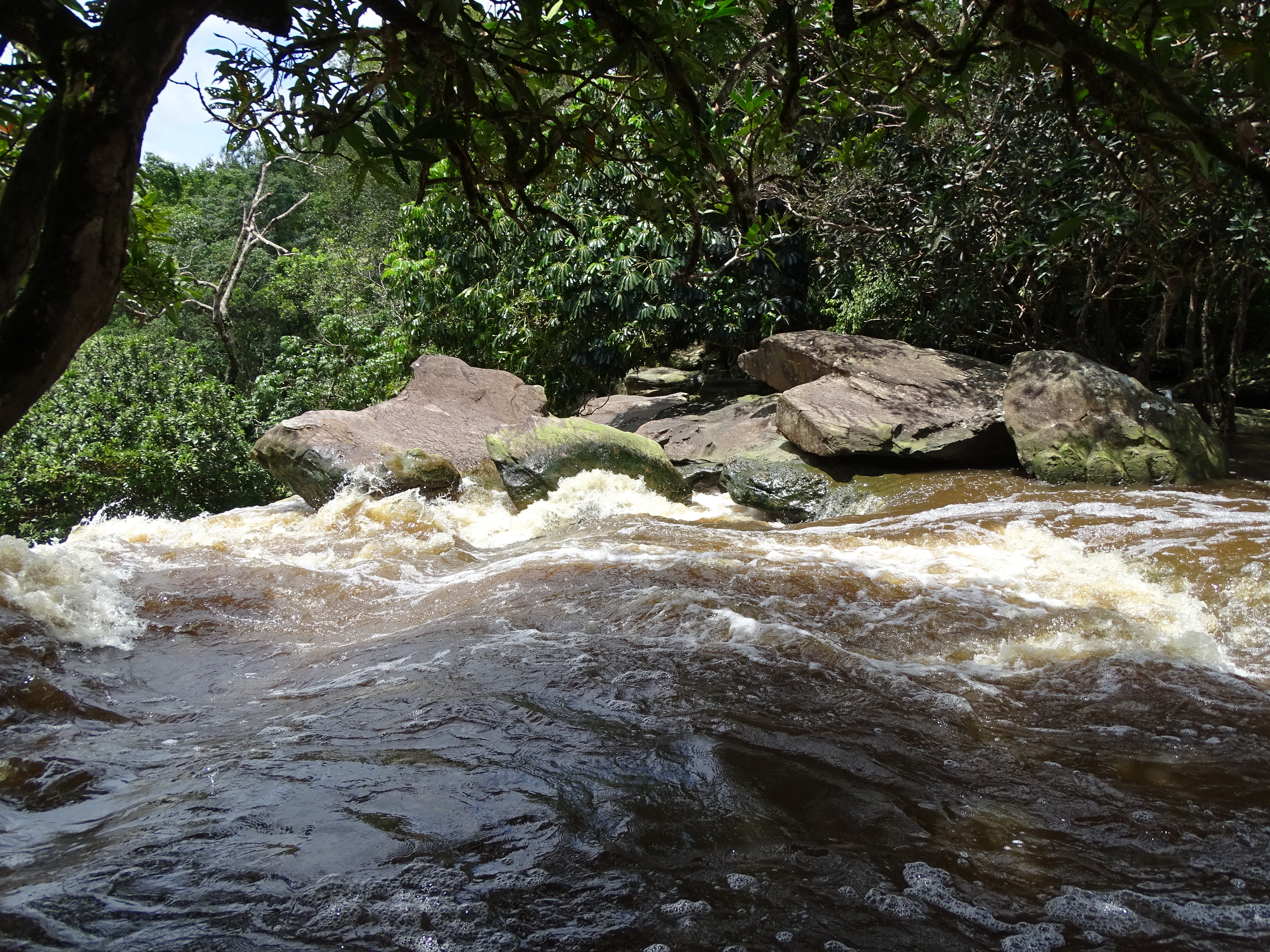
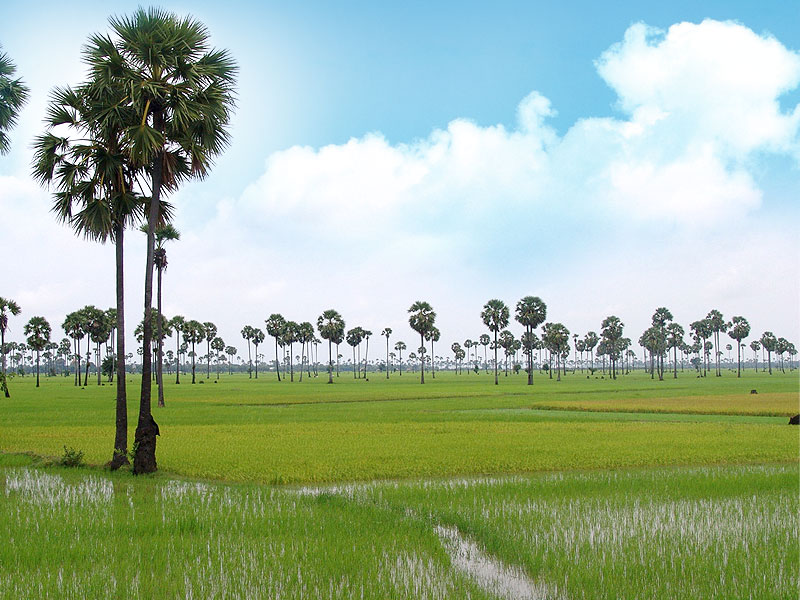

- Seal

- Map of Cambodia highlighting Kampot
- Coordinates: 10°36′N 104°10′E
- Country: Cambodia
- Capital: Kampot
- Municipalities: Kampot, Bokor
- Provincial status: 20 August 1923

Government
  - Governor: Mao Thonin (CPP)
  - Deputy Governor: Koeut Chhe
  - National Assembly: 6 / 125

Area
  - Total: 4,873 km^{2} (1,881 sq mi)
  - Rank: 17th

Population (2024)
  - Total: ▲682,987
  - Rank: 12th
  - Density: 143/km^{2} (370/sq mi)
  - Rank: 12th
- Demonym: Kampotian
- Time zone: UTC+7 (ICT)
- Dialing code: +855
- ISO 3166 code: KH-7
- Municipalities: 2
- Districts: 7
- Communes: 93
- Villages: 488
- Website: kampot.gov.kh

Kampot Province (Khmer: ខេត្តកំពត, Khaet Kǎmpôt, [kɑm.pɔːt]) is a province in southwestern Cambodia. It borders the provinces of Kampong Speu to the north, Takéo to the east, Kep and the country of Vietnam (An Giang) or Kampuchea Krom (Peam) to the south, and Preah Shianouk to the west. To its south it has a coastline of around 45 km on the Gulf of Thailand. Its capital is the city of Kampot.

Kampot had a population of 627,884 in 2010 and consists of eight districts divided into 92 communes with a total of 477 villages. The Preah Monivong National Park at 140,000 hectares is located in Kampot.

== History ==
In the 19th century, during the French Indochina period, Kampot became a regional administrative center with the status of a state border district as a result of the delimitation of the Kingdom of Cambodia. The Circonscription Résidentielle de Kampot contained the arrondissements of Kampot, Kompong-Som, Trang and Kong-Pisey.

In 1889, French colonial census reports a multi-ethnic community: Kampot town consisted of "Cambodian Kampot" on the Prek-Kampot River and "Chinese Kampot" on the right riverbank of the west branch of the Prek-Thom River. Nearby was a Vietnamese village, called Tien-Thanh and another Vietnamese village on Traeuy Koh Island. A Malay one existed on Traeuy Koh Island. Additional villages of mixed ethnicity are listed.

Destruction and mass murder happened throughout Kampot province, as the Cambodian genocide and massacres engulfed Kampot province under the Khmer Rouge rule. A total 90,450 persons were massacred throughout the province.

== Districts ==
The province is subdivided into 7 districts and 2 municipality.

ISO code	District	Khmer	Population (2019)
07-01	Angkor Chey	ស្រុកអង្គរជ័យ	88,263
07-02	Banteay Meas	ស្រុកបន្ទាយមាស	100,299
07-03	Chhouk	ស្រុកឈូក	125,406
07-04	Chum Kiri	ស្រុកជុំគិរី	56,784
07-05	Dang Tong	ស្រុកដងទង់	63,911
07-06	Kampong Trach	ស្រុកកំពង់ត្រាច	98,683
07-07	Tuek Chhou	ស្រុកទឹកឈូ	126,789
07-08	Kampot Municipality	ក្រុងកំពត	38,950
07-09	Bokor Municipality	ក្រុងបូកគោ	

== Religion ==
Religion in Kampot (2019 census)
1. Buddhism (96.9%)
2. Islam (2.80%)
3. Christianity (0.20%)
4. Animism and Other religions (0.00%)

== Environment ==
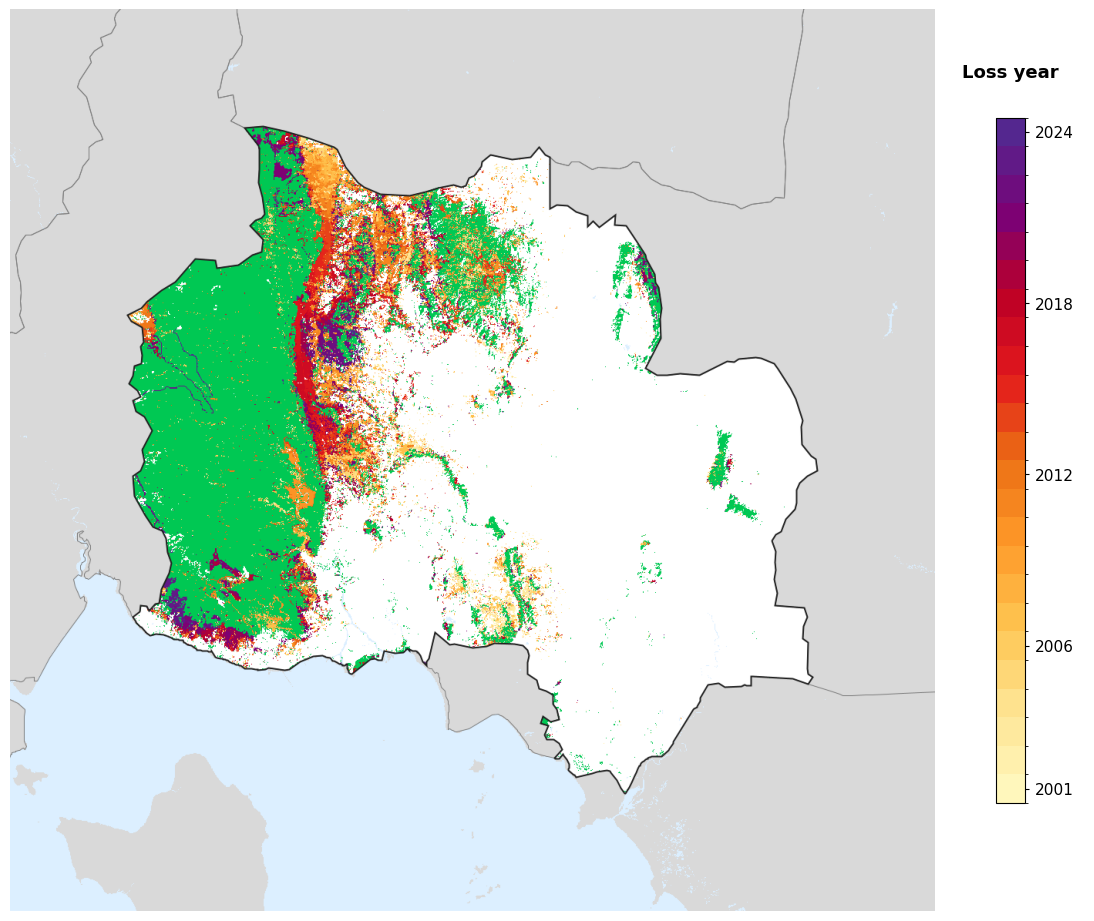
Tree-cover loss year in Kampot, 2001-2024, from the Global Forest Change dataset.

== Gallery ==
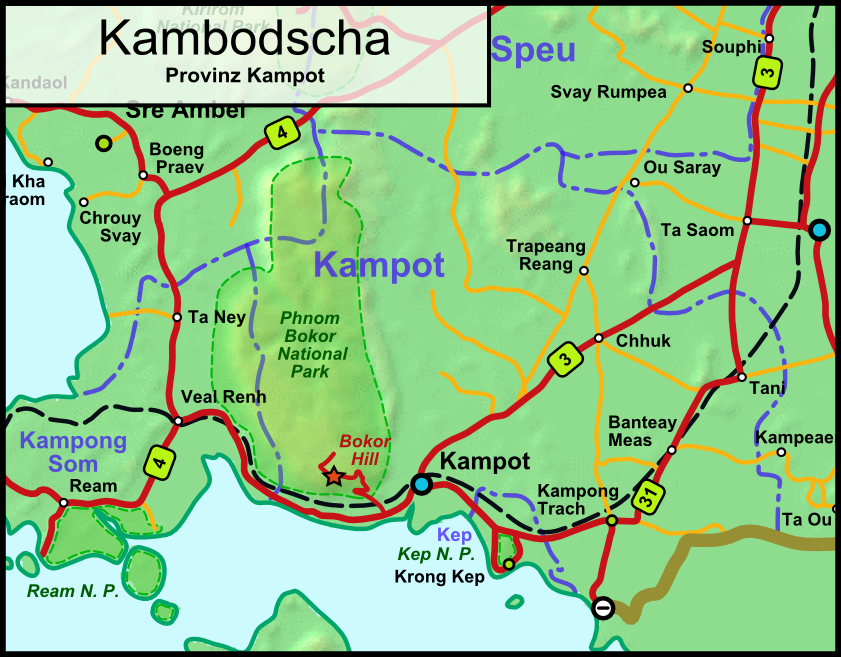
Map of Kampot province

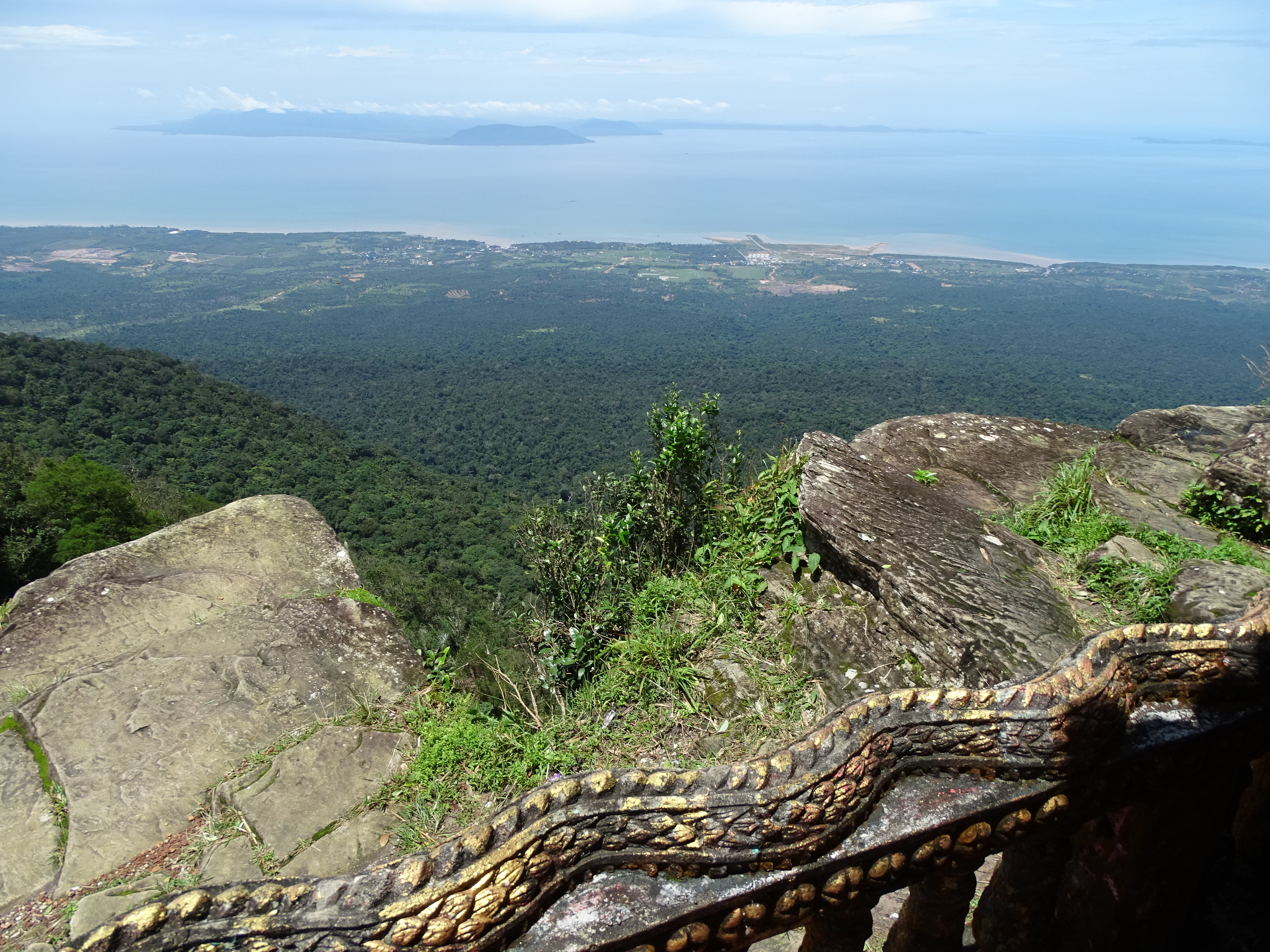
View of the coast near Kampot from Bokor mountain (Phnom Bokor).

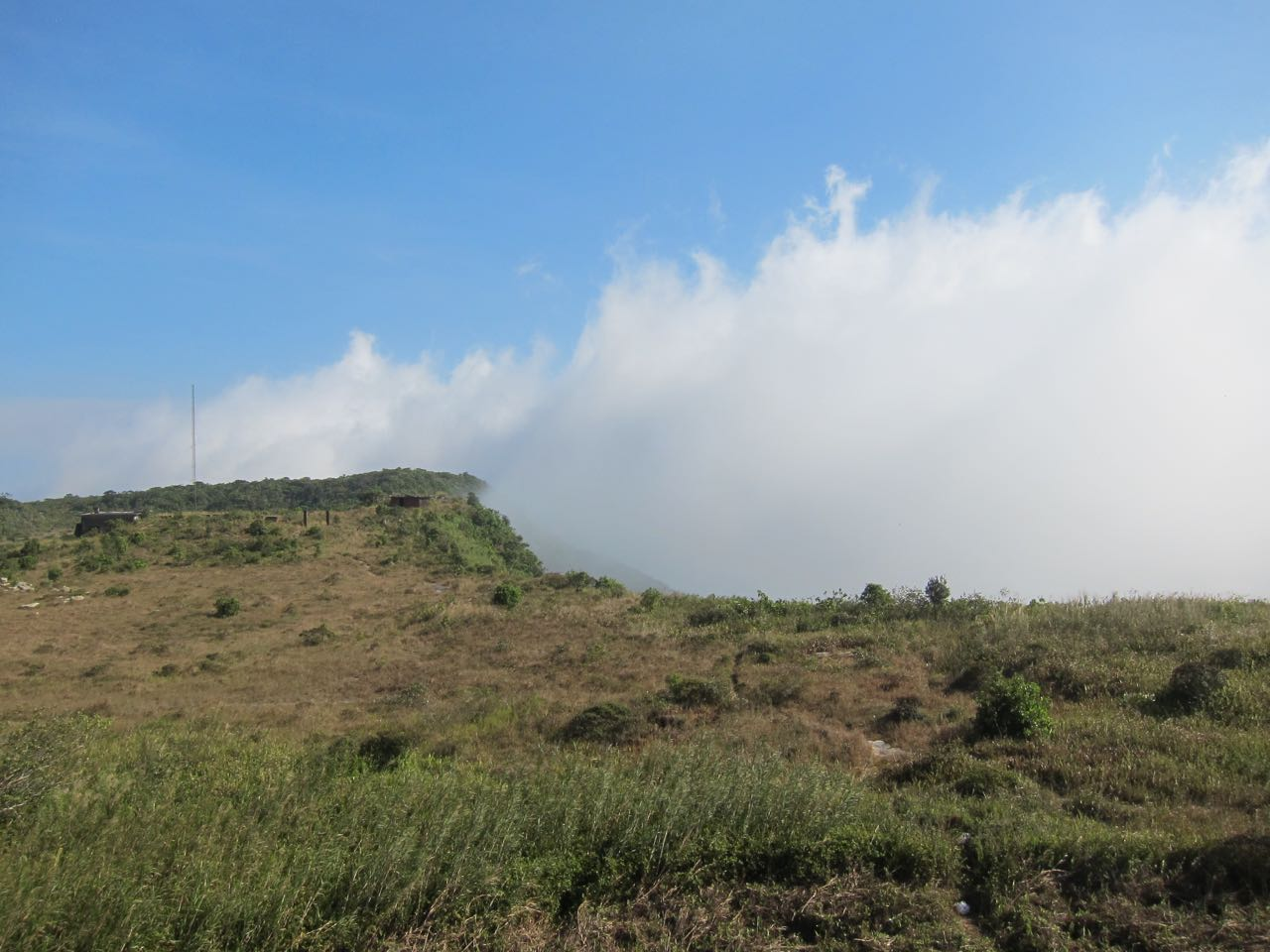
The Dâmrei Mountains receives monsoon rainfalls, and keeps the eastern parts of the province in rain shadow.

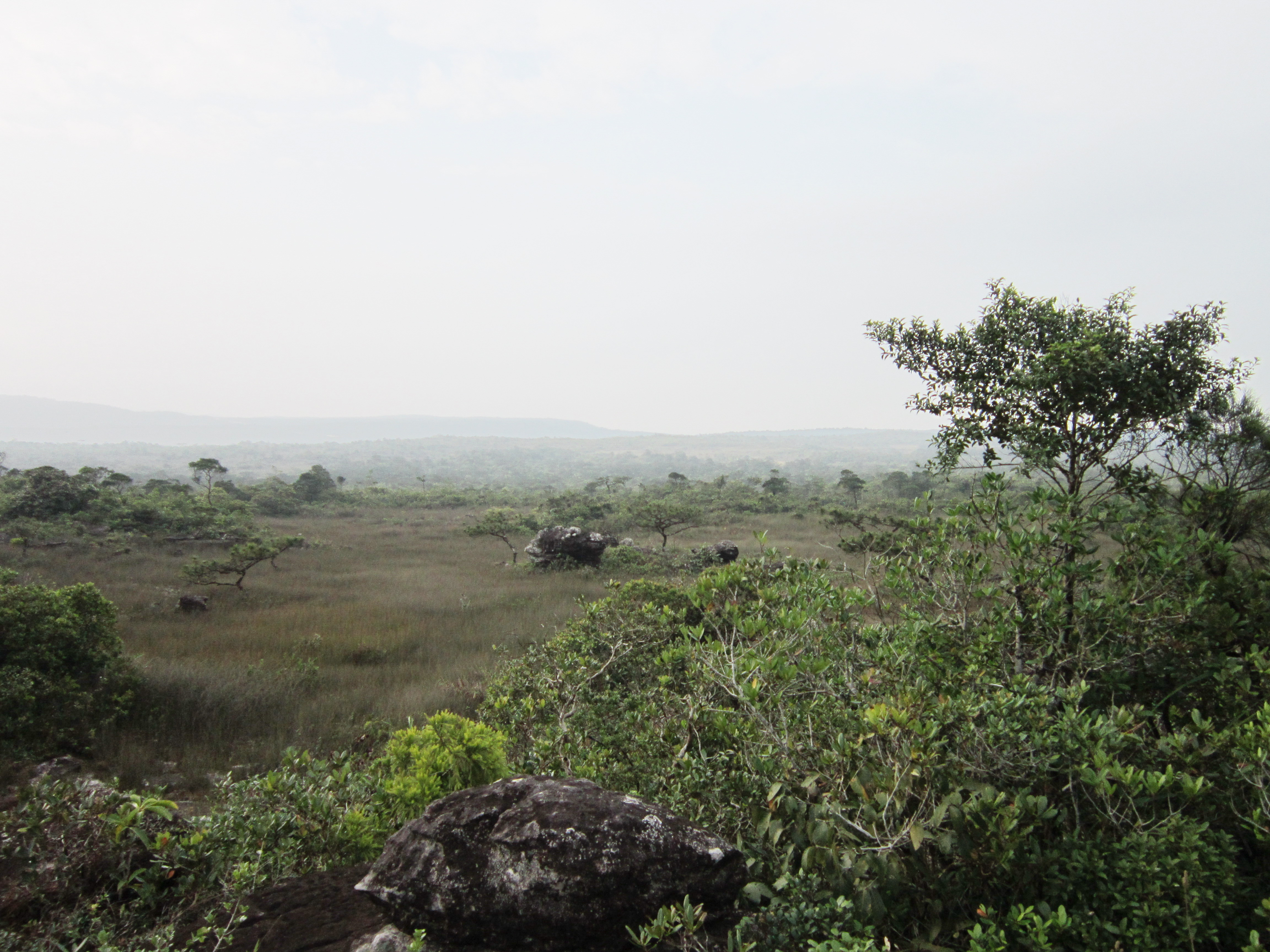
The highland plateaus in Phnom Bokor National Park

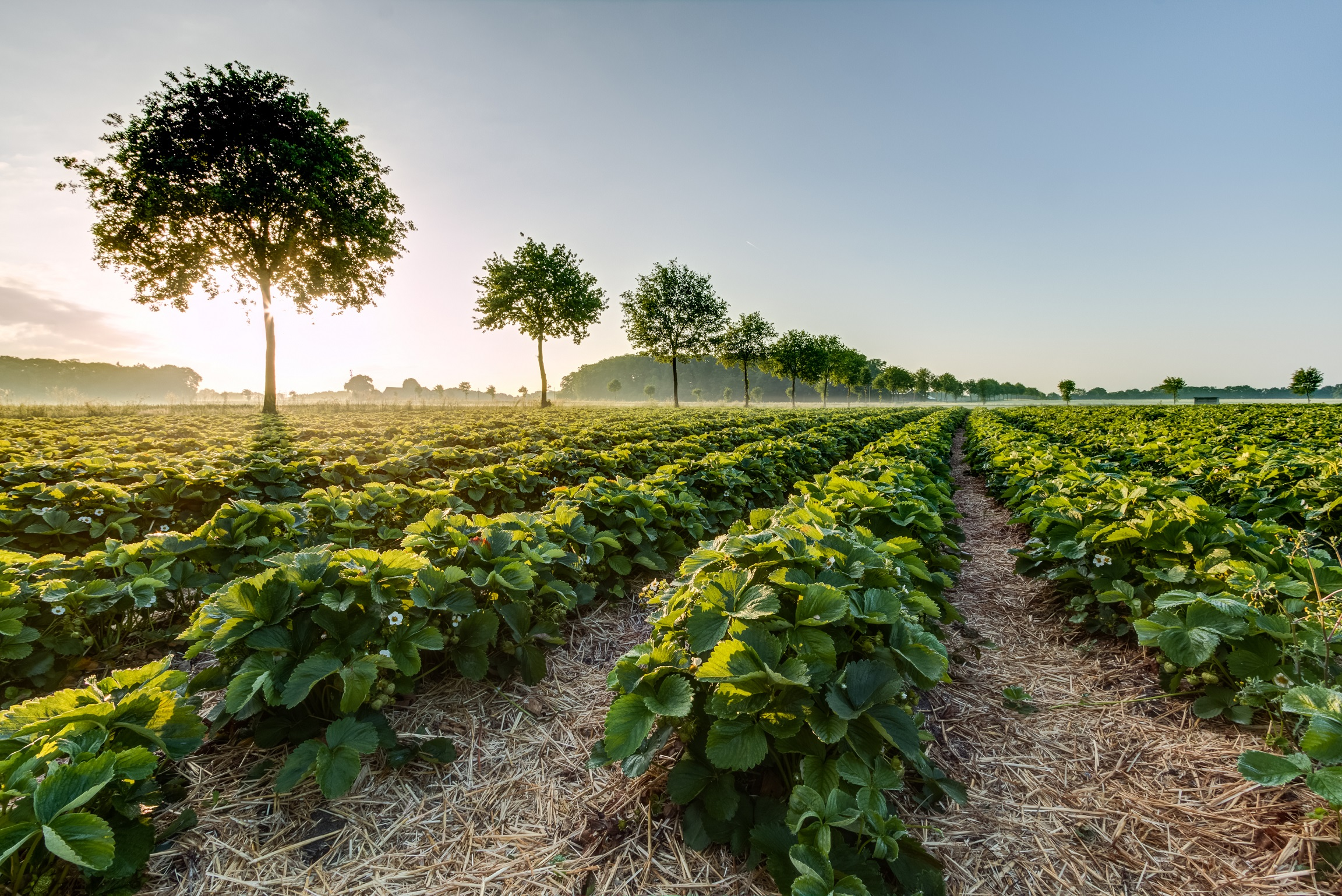
Farmlands

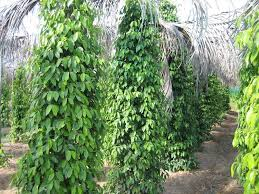
Kampot pepper farm

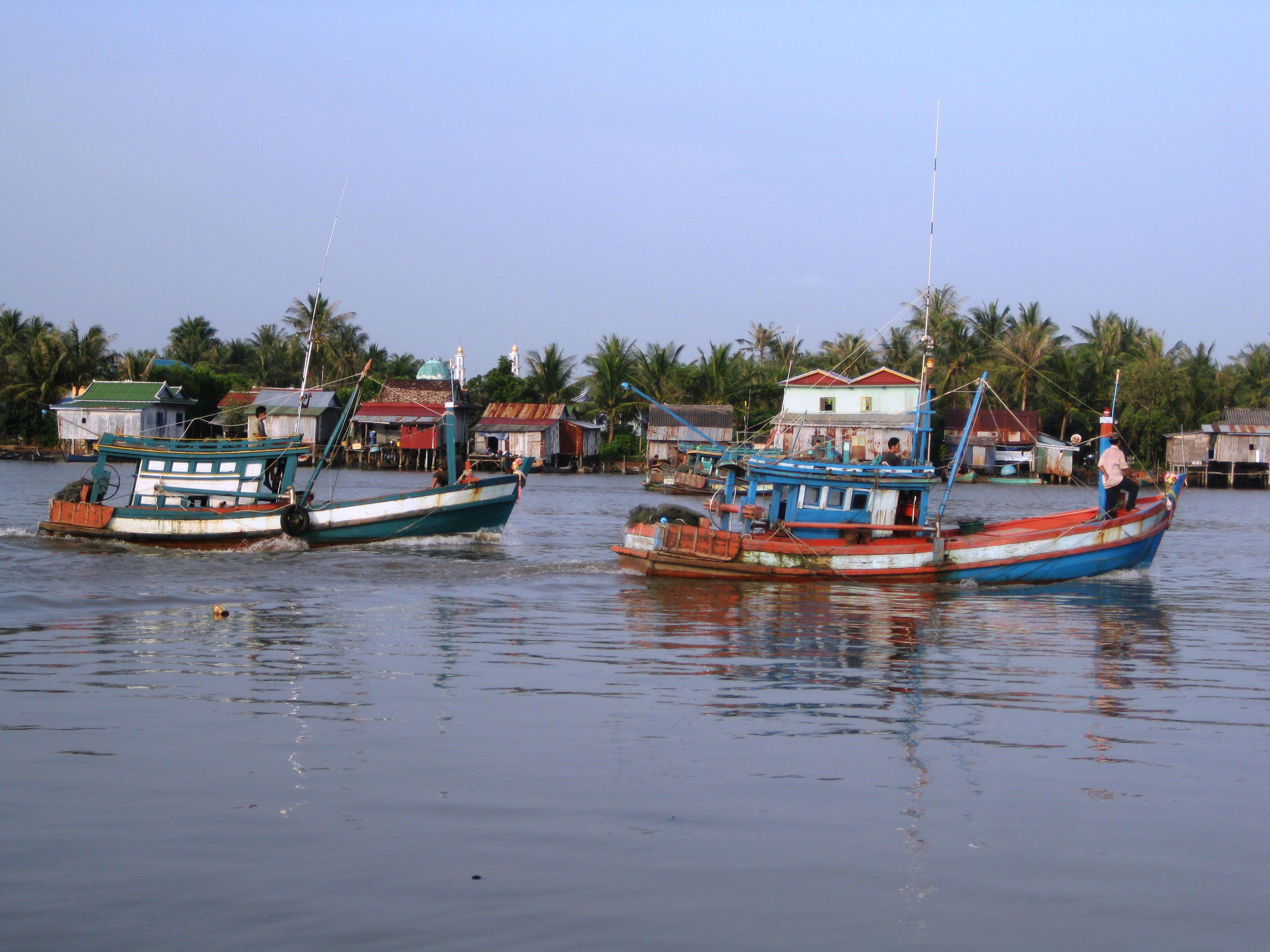
Fishing boats on Kampot River

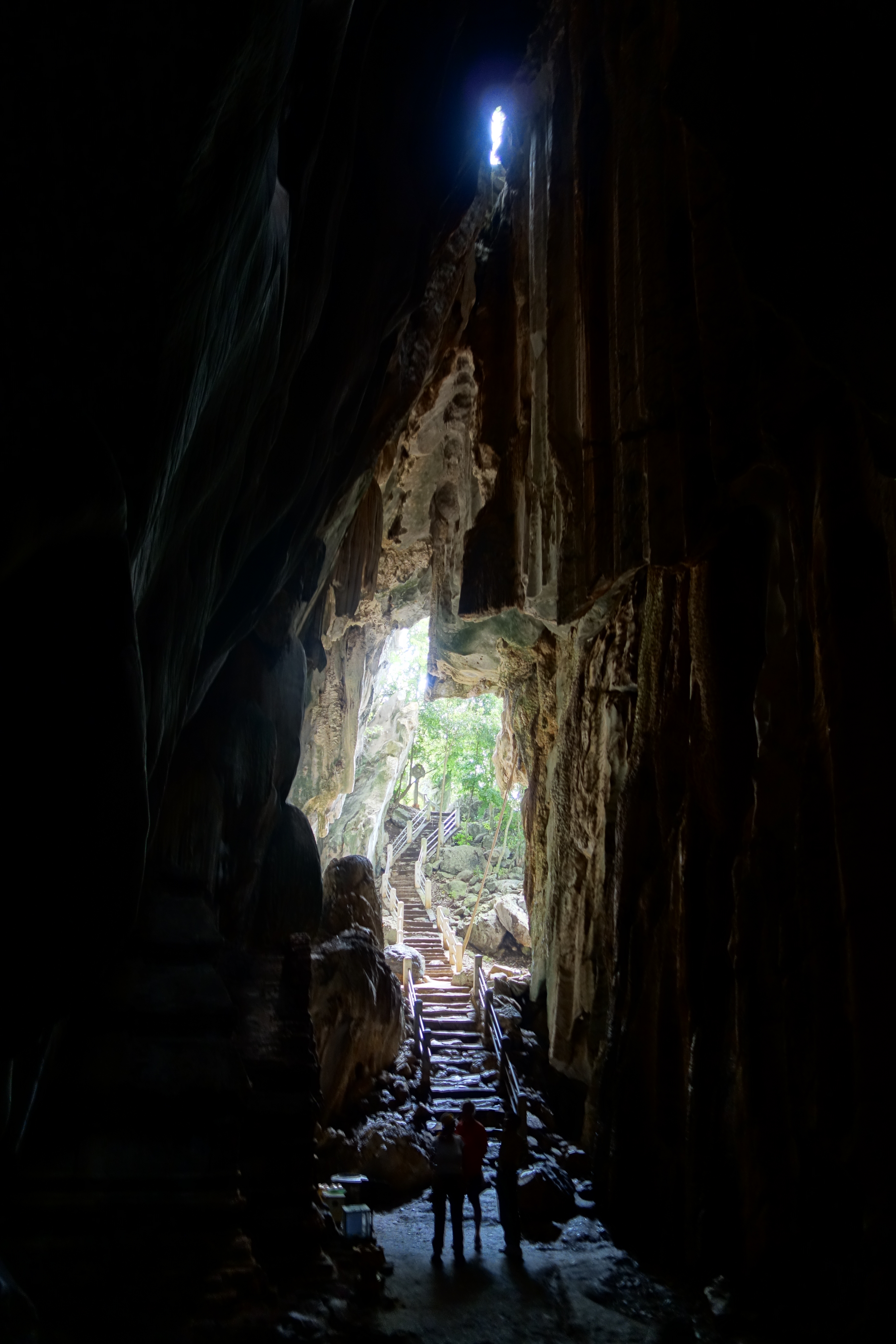
Phnom Chhnork, cave temple near Kampot city

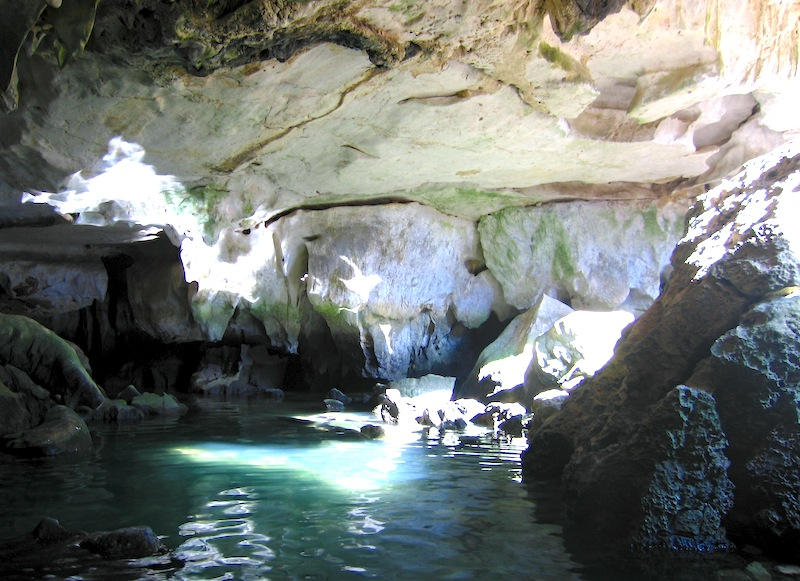
Caves in Kampong Trach
