= Num banhchok =

Cambodian noodle soup

- Alternative names: Num banh chok, Cambodian rice noodles, Khmer noodles, nom panchok, nom pachok, noum bahnchok, num panchok, num pachok
- Course: Breakfast or sometimes lunch
- Place of origin: Cambodia
- Region or state: Southeast Asia
- Associated cuisine: Cambodian and Cham cuisine
- Serving temperature: Warm to room temperature
- Main ingredients: Rice, prahok
- Variations: See variations
- Similar dishes: khanom chin, bún, mixian

Num banhchok (Khmer: នំបញ្ចុក, Nom bǎnh-chŏk Khmer pronunciation: [nom ɓaɲcok]) are lightly fermented Cambodian rice noodles and a breakfast noodle dish.

banhchok "បញ្ចុក" translates to "to feed" in Khmer language.

== Preparation ==
Num banhchok is made by soaking rice for 2–4 hours and grinding it into a liquidy paste. The paste is pressed into round shapes and dried inside calico bags. Then it is pulverized and turned into a viscous paste, which is extruded into boiling water. The noodles are boiled for 3–4 minutes and transferred to cold water.

== Variations ==
There are many variations of num banhchok across the country.

- Num banhchok samlor proher (សម្លរប្រហើរនំបញ្ចុក) with a base made out of yellow or yellow-green kroeung, pounded from either lemongrass stalks (for yellow kroeung) or leaves (for green kroeung), kaffir lime leaves and zest, garlic, turmeric, and fingerroot, freshwater fish (usually snakehead), prahok and coconut milk or coconut cream.
- Num banhchok Siem Reap (នំបញ្ចុកសៀមរាប) shares the same ingredients as num banhchok samlor proher, but has a thinner consistency when no coconut milk or coconut cream is added. Sometimes fish sauce is used to replace prahok, while others argue that without prahok it's not num banhchok Siem Reap.
- Num banhchok samlor Khmer (នំបញ្ចុកសម្លខ្មែរ) with a base made out of green kroeung with pounded fish and varying amount of lemongrass with or without the addition of coconut milk. It is served with a peanut-based relish.
- Num banhchok samlor teuk trei phaem with a base made out of coconut milk or coconut cream, and a sour and sweet (pahem) sauce made out of ingredients, such as fish sauce, smoked fish, grated coconut, ground peanuts and tamarind juice.
- Num banhchok samlor namya (នំបញ្ចុកសម្លណាំយ៉ា) or num banhchok ktis trei with a red curry (samlor cari) base made out of red kroeung and coconut milk with fish and often shrimp paste and fish sauce.
- Num banhchok samlor cari (នំបញ្ចុកសម្លការី) with red curry base made out of coconut milk-based red kroeung with meat (chicken or beef, as well as optinal offal and pig blood curd) instead of fish, and vegetables such as carrots, potatoes and onions.
- Num banhchok Kampot – a regional specialty of Kampot prepared with peanuts, dried shrimp, Kampot fish sauce made from saltwater fish and, occasionally, sliced fish cakes. Unlike other variations that are eaten at room temperature, num banhchok Kampot is typically eaten cold.
- Num banhchok samlor makod – a royal version of num banhchok with chicken livers, Cognac and green peas included in Princess Rasmi Sobhana's 1965 "The Cambodian Cookbook" published by American Women's Club of Cambodia.
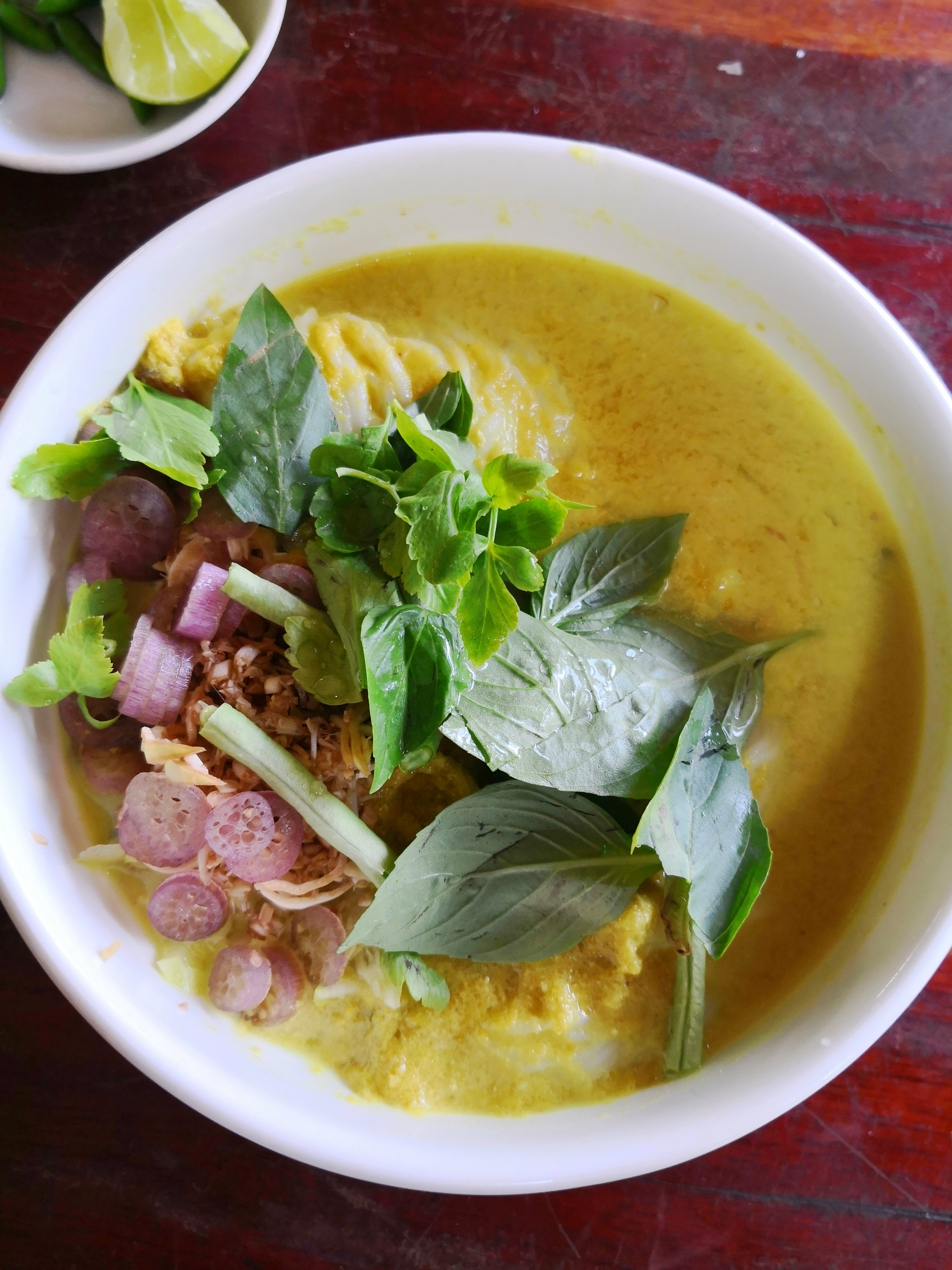
Num banhchok samlor proher

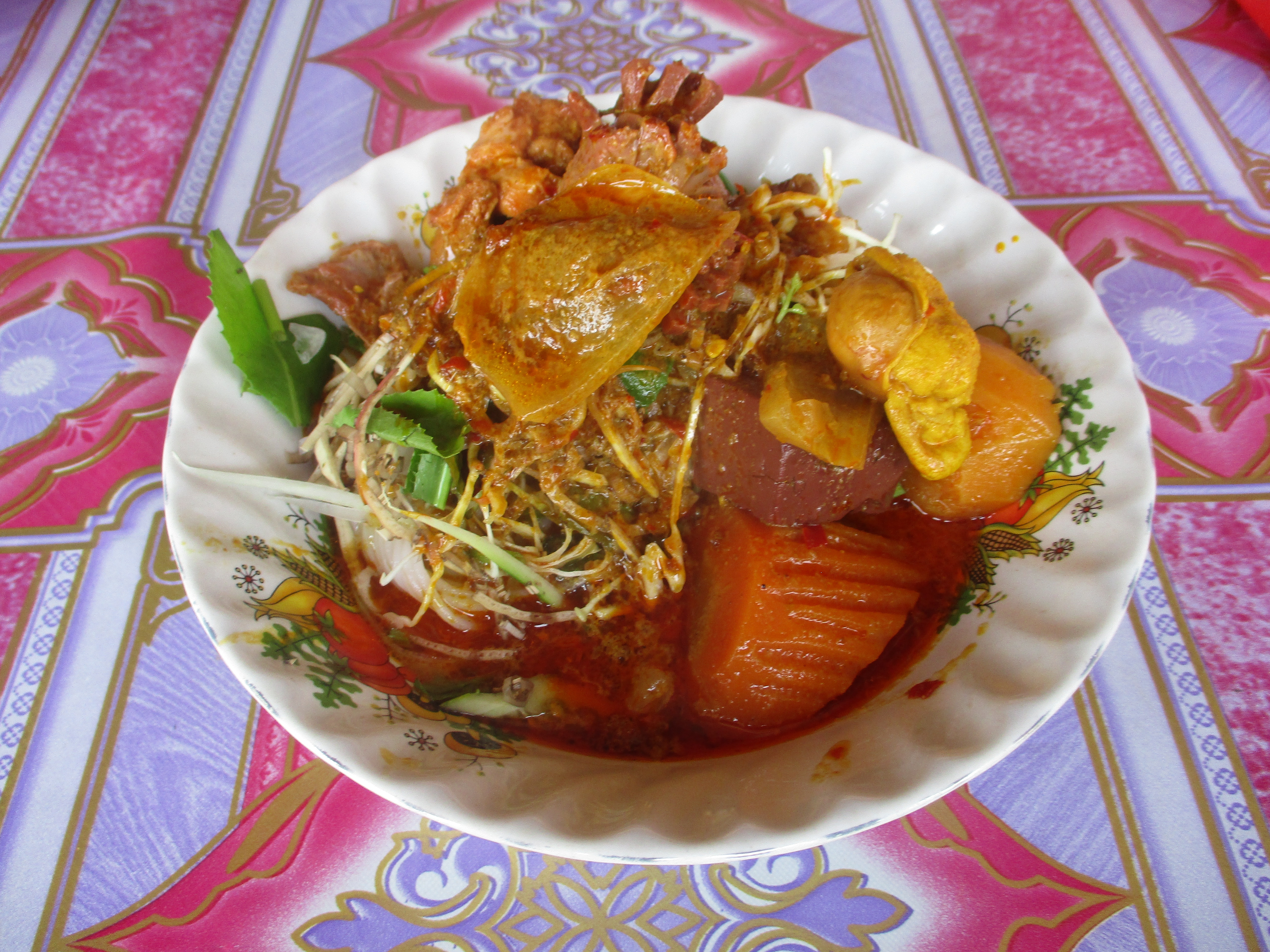
Num banhchok samlor cari

Phnom Penh and Ho Chi Minh City-based eatery Pizza 4P's makes a fusion num banhchok pizza with a yellow kroeung, coconut milk and prahok sauce, freshwater fish, cheese, peanuts, water celery, basil, water mimosa, banana blossoms, water hyacinths and sesbania flowers.

== In folklore ==
Num banhchok is featured in a popular Khmer folk legend about an influential revolutionary and scholar Thon Chey who was exiled to China by the Khmer king, where Thon Chey began making num banhchok to make a living. The dish quickly gained popularity among the Chinese and eventually attracted even the attention of the Chinese emperor. The emperor summoned Thon Chey to bring num banhchok to his palace. Thon Chey arrived and while the emperor was tasting the dish Thon Chey managed to see the emperor's face, comparing it to a dog and the face of his Khmer king to that of a bright full moon, for which Thon Chey was immediately thrown into jail. However, soon Thon Chey managed to get released and eventually returned to the Khmer Empire.
