= Kabalromih =

Village in Kampot Province, Cambodia

Kabalromih is a village in Kampot Province, Cambodia. It is located about 5 miles (8.0 km) from Kampot and surrounded in mangrove swamp. It is inhabited by Khmer Muslims, mostly engaged in fishing and boat building, for which it is famed for.

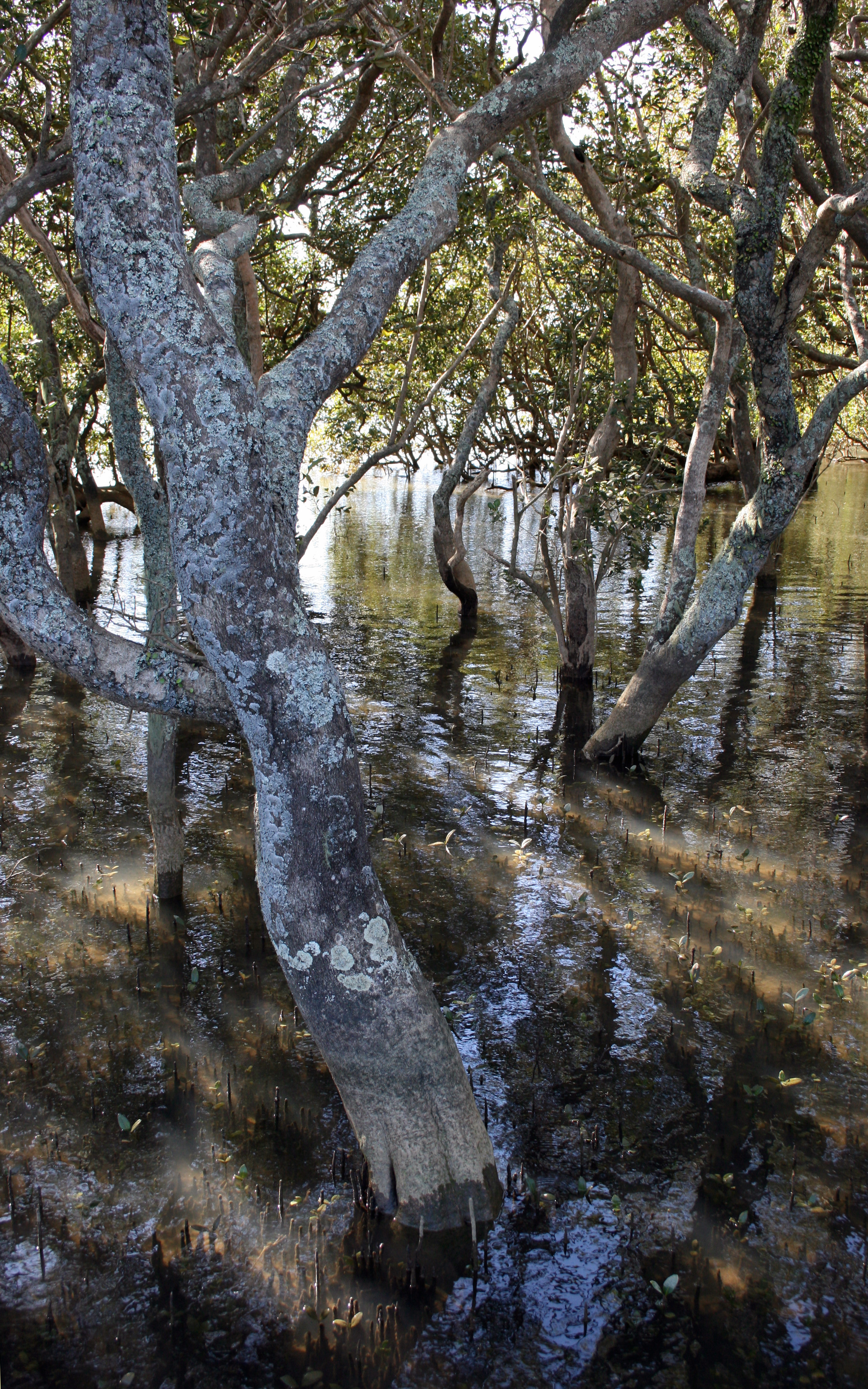
A mangrove swamp
