= Samlor prahal =

Cambodian soup

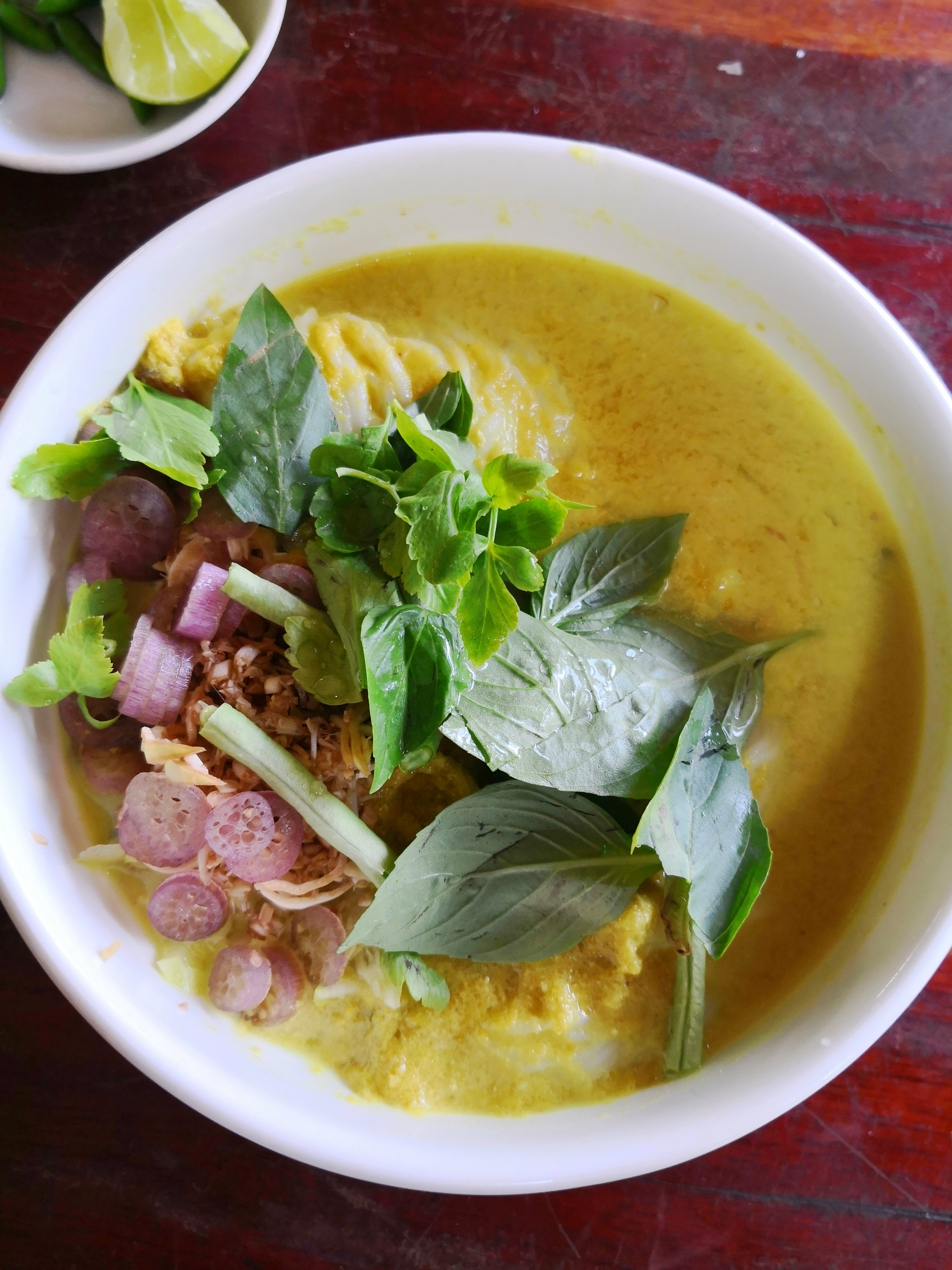
- Samlor prahal with num banhchok noodles
- Alternative names: Samlor proher, samlor broheu, samlor proheur, somlor proher, somlor broheu, somlor proheur, somlar prahal, somlar proher, somlar proheur
- Type: soup
- Place of origin: Cambodia
- Region or state: Southeast Asia
- Associated cuisine: Cambodia
- Serving temperature: hot
- Main ingredients: chicken or fish stock, lemongrass or green kroeung, freshwater fish (bream, pike or brown trout), vegetables (taro, winter melon, pumpkin, and luffa), fresh herbs (climbing wattle, wild asparagus, coriander or hot mint)

Samlor prahal (Khmer: សម្លប្រហើរ, lit. 'fragrant soup') is a popular Cambodian soup and a staple food of Cambodian villages.

== Preparation ==
The base of the soup is made with chicken or fish stock and lemongrass or green kroeung. It consists of cut vegetables (such as taro, winter melon, pumpkin, and luffa), mushrooms, and freshwater fish (such as bream, pike or brown trout), coconut blossom flavoured with palm sugar, fish sauce, and rice powder, and garnished with fresh herbs (such as climbing wattle, wild asparagus, coriander or hot mint).

The soup is made with kroeung in the mountain and coastal regions, while in the regions near rivers a clear version of the soup with less lemongrass is more common. A vegetarian version of the soup is referred to as "mhob bouh" or "as the monks eat", although monks do not necessarily adhere to a vegetarian diet.
