= Kampot =

Kampot ក្រុងកំពត
- City
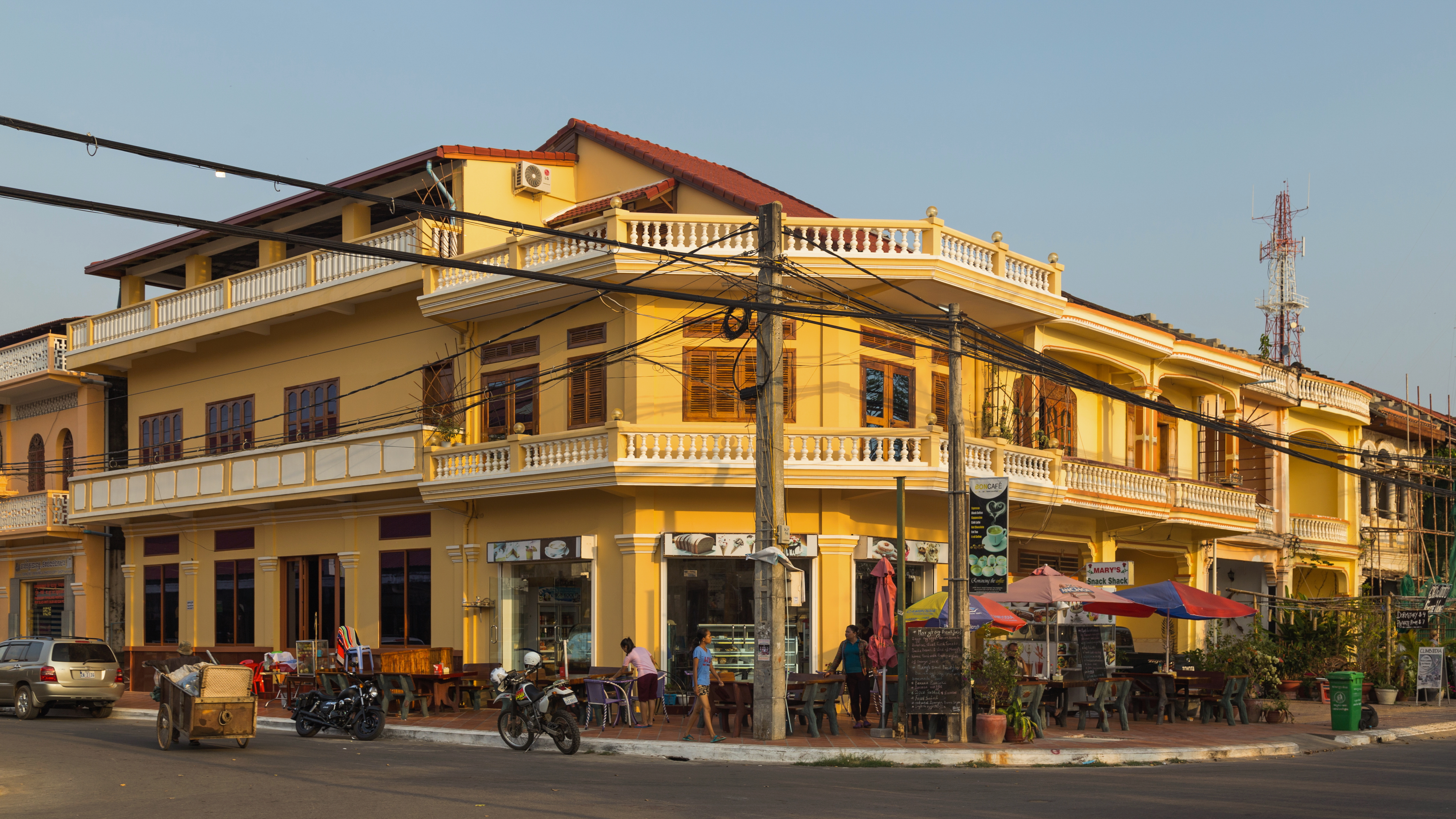
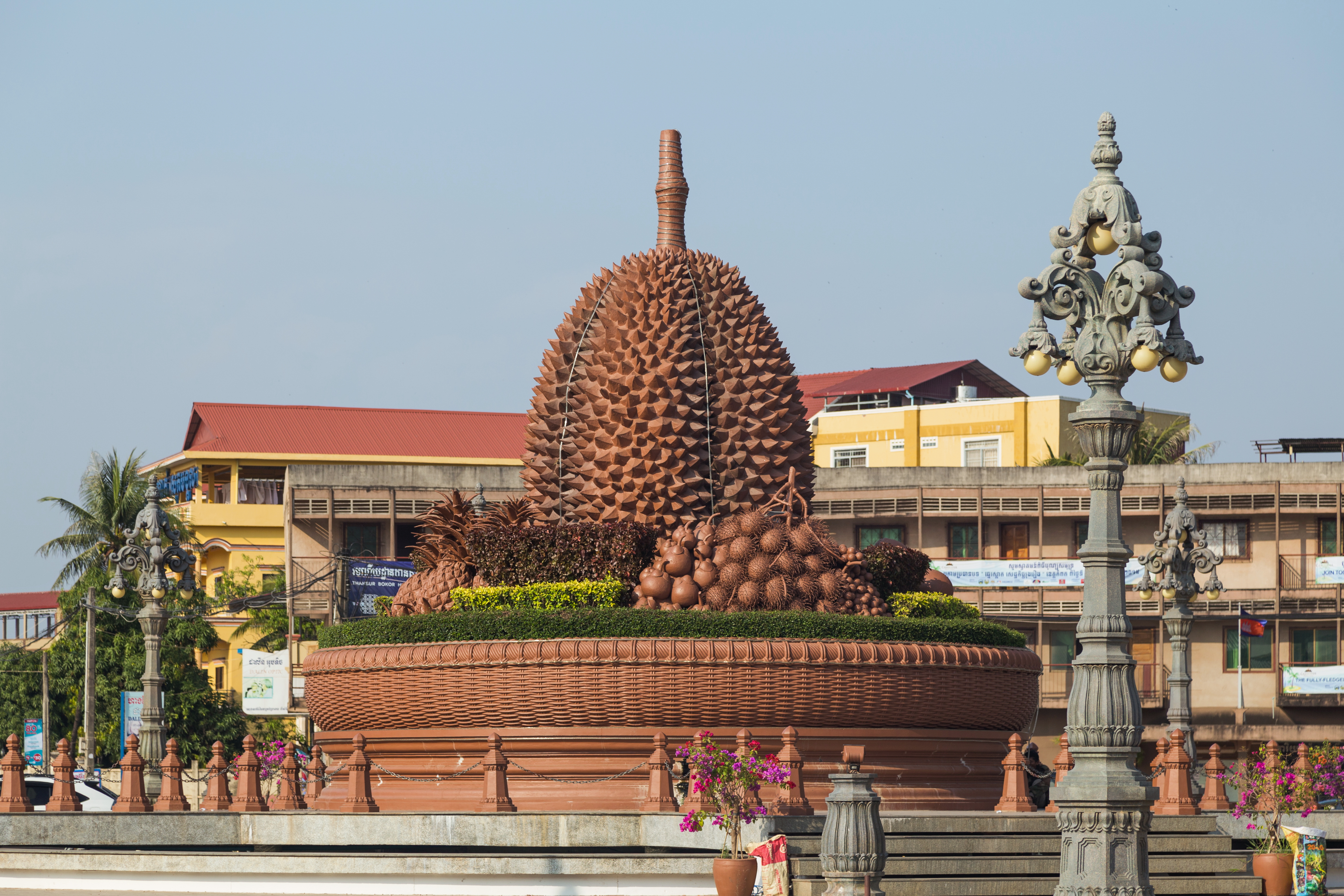
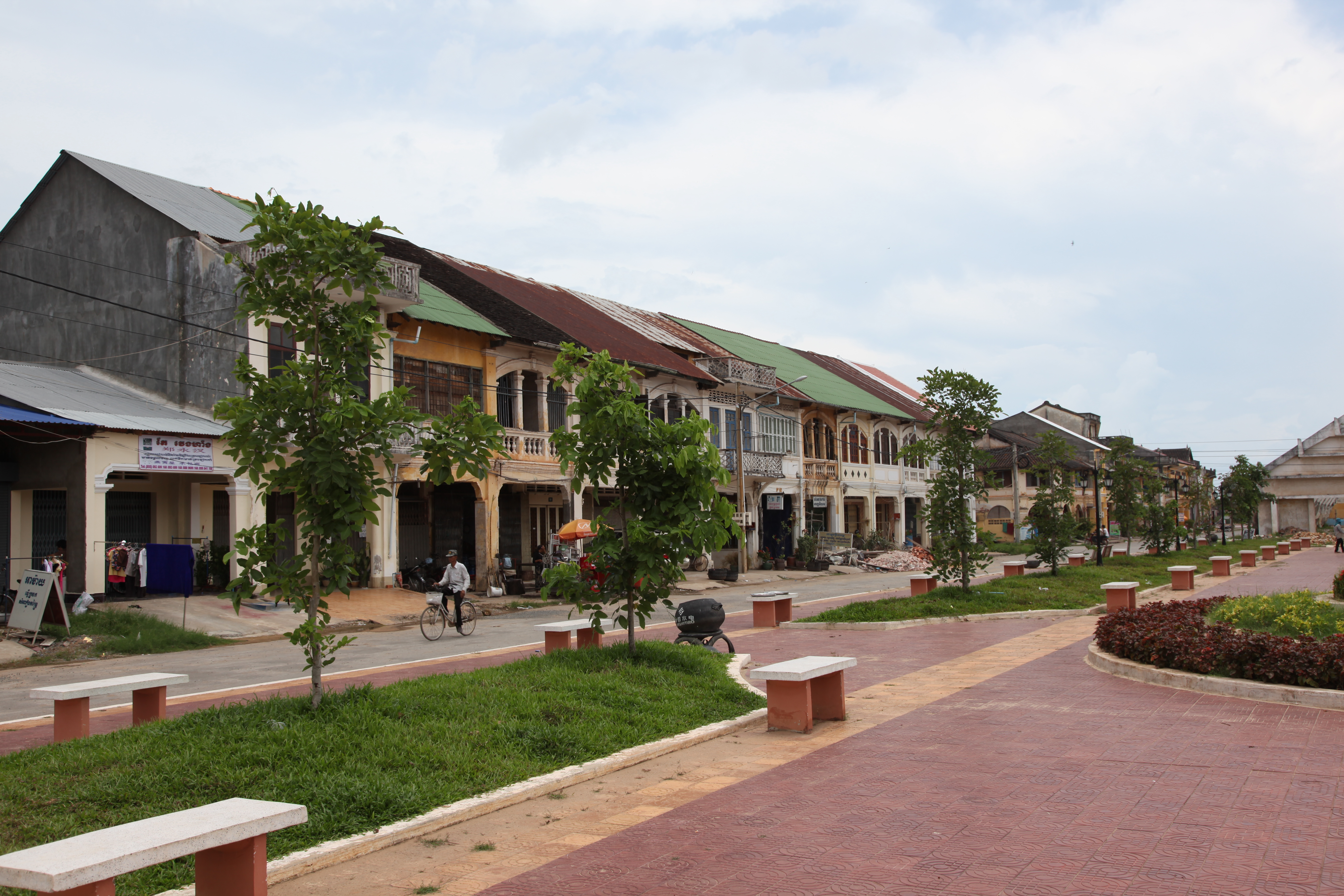
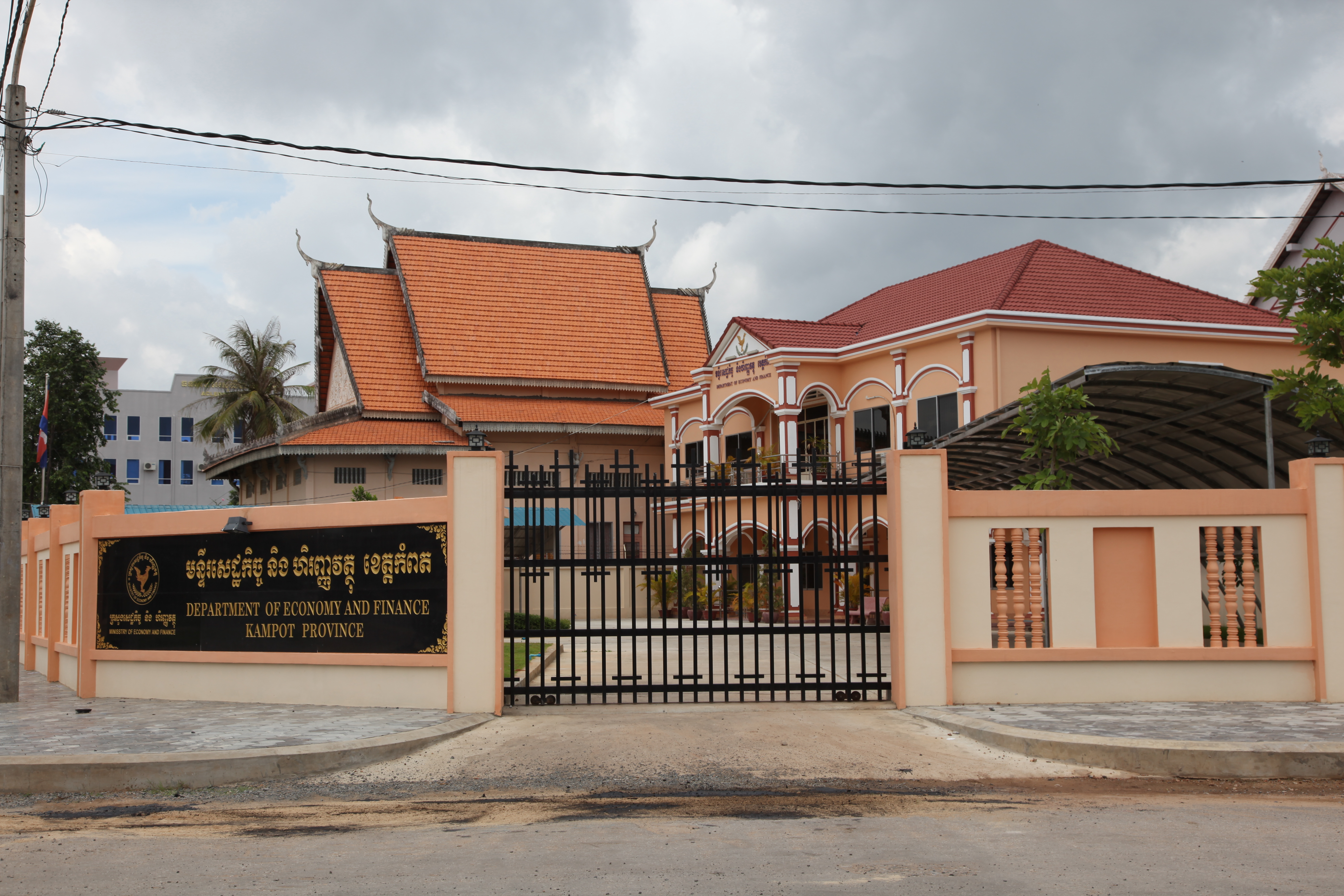
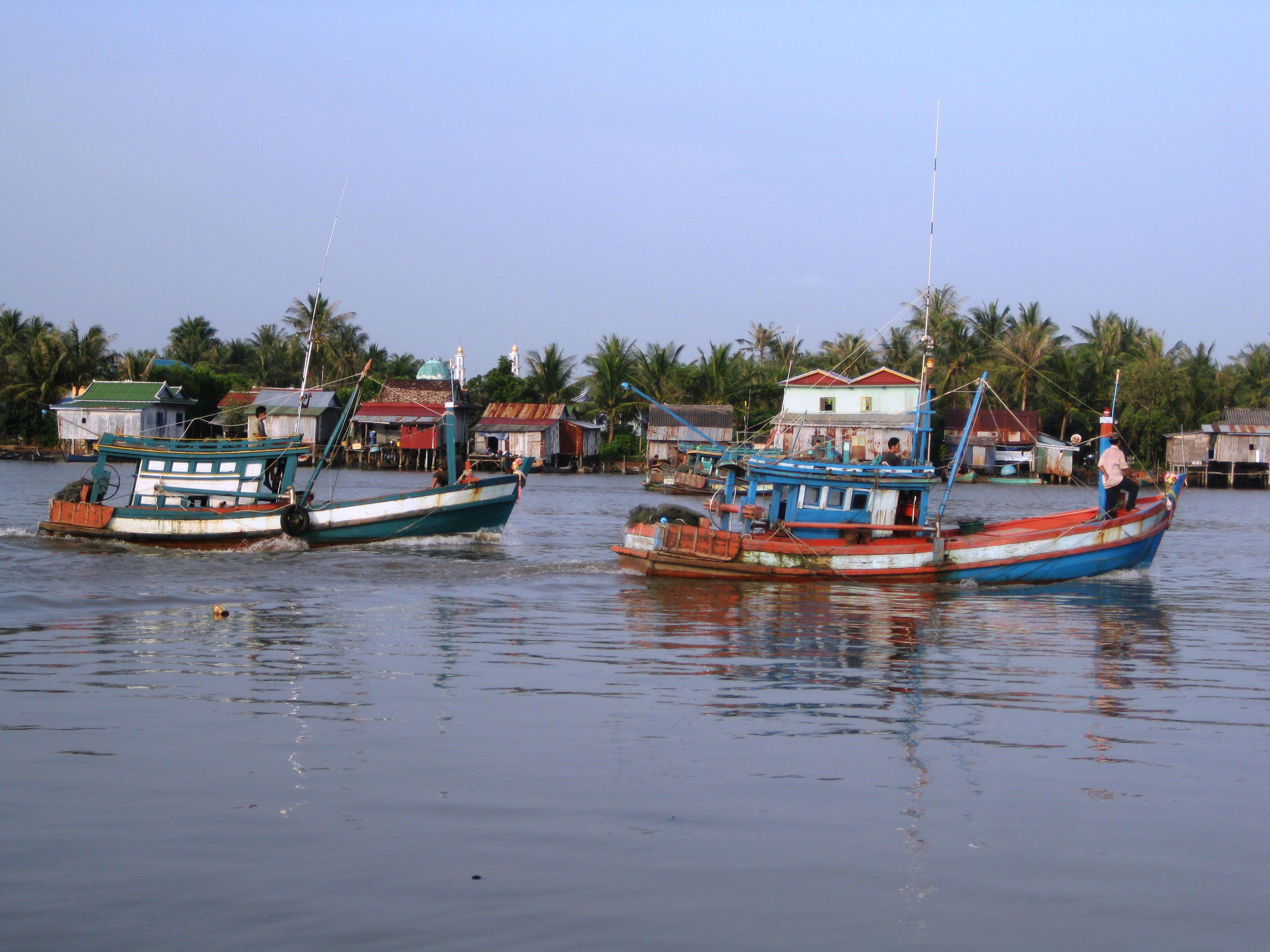
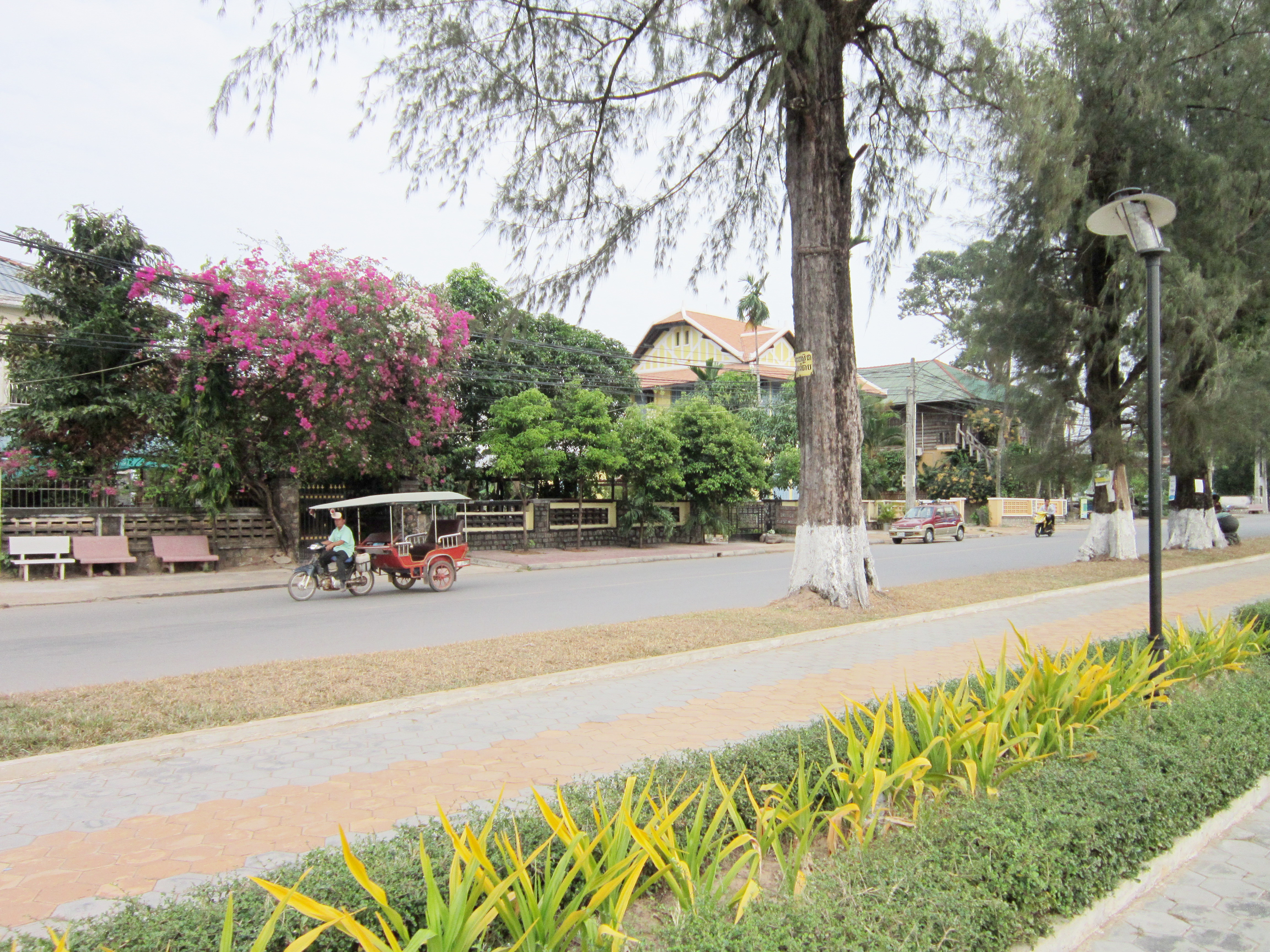
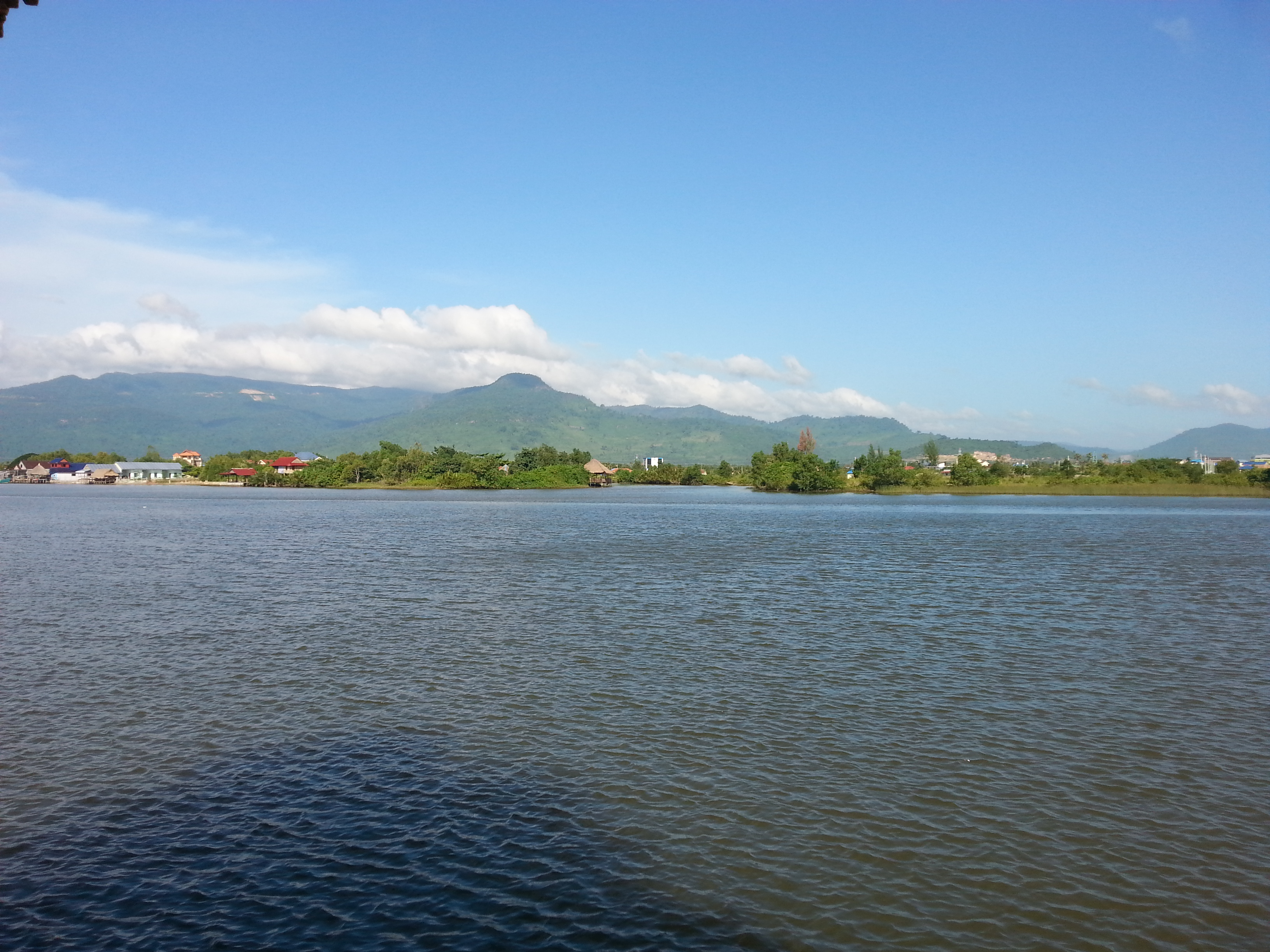

- Location within Cambodia
- Coordinates: 10°36′N 104°10′E
- Country: Cambodia
- Province: Kampot
- District: Kampot

Government
  - Type: City municipality
  - Mayor: Neak Sovannary
- Elevation: 1 m (3.3 ft)

Population (2022)
  - Total: 42,053
  - Rank: 10th
- Time zone: UTC+7 (ICT)
- Website: kampot.city

Kampot (Khmer: ក្រុងកំពត) is a city in southern Cambodia and the capital of Kampot province. It is situated on the Praek Tuek Chhu River, southeast of the Elephant Mountains, and around five kilometres (three miles) from the Gulf of Thailand. Kampot was the capital of the Circonscription Résidentielle de Kampot under French rule and Cambodia's most important seaport after the loss of the Mekong Delta and before the establishment of Sihanoukville. Its center is, unlike most Cambodian provincial capitals, composed of 19th-century French colonial architecture. The region and town are known for high-quality pepper, which is exported worldwide. It is also known for its fish sauce, sea salt, and durian. The government and the Ministry of Culture and Fine Art have been preparing documents to nominate the Old Town of Kampot for admission to the UNESCO World Heritage Site list (along with the Old Town of Battambang and the Old Town of Kratie), since 2017.

== History ==
=== Khmer breach between Siam and Ha-Tien since 1771 ===
The first description of Kampot in the Cambodian Royal Chronicles refers to an event that took place from 1771 to 1775. In 1771, King Taksin of Siam attacked Hà Tiên and destroyed it completely before marching on the Cambodian capital of Oudong.

In an effort to overthrow the Khmer king Outey II, who was allied with the Vietnamese Mac Thien Tu, based in Ha-Tien, the young Khmer prince and future king Ang Non II gathered with Siamese soldiers in Kampot, which he used as a base for his hostilities until obtaining the throne in 1775.

=== Uprising of Oknha Mau in 1841 ===
In 1841, Oknha-Mau, a Cambodian governor, refused the Vietnamese yoke that had gradually been imposed on Kampot. Supported by Siam, he gathered a military contingent of about 3,000 Cambodians. The Vietnamese fled to Ha-Tien.

=== First international seaport of Cambodia (1841–1860) ===
Upon his rise to the throne in 1840, Khmer king Ang Duong constructed a road from his capital of Oudong to Kampot and opened Kampot as the only international seaport of Cambodia. Imports and exports grew quickly in the hands of the Anglo-Chinese merchants of Singapore, turning a neighborhood of the city into "Chinese Kampot". French missionary Father Hestret founded the first Catholic Church in the city at that time and received the visit of French explorer Henri Mouhot.

=== From French protectorate to insurrection (1863–1886) ===
Cambodia became a protectorate of France in 1863. King Norodom appointed a Vietnamese as chief of the canton and let him control the village and all Vietnamese people in the province. After this period, Kampot began to decline. The main reason was the opening of Saigon Port, and the exploitation of navigation along the Mekong River by the French.

Resentment grew among the population. An insurrection began on 17 March 1885 at noon, when a band of fifty men sacked the opium entrepôt held by the French. Another band of fifty attacked the telegraph office. The customhouse at the entrance of the river became a fort of insurgents. At the beginning of April, a French aviso, Le Sagittaire, and two junks, appeared at the Kampot anchorage. Tensions escalated as violence broke out throughout the province, with a complex play of alliances and betrayals as well as interference from Chinese pirates. On 8 May 1886, a column of 100 soldiers under Lieutenant de Vaubert departed Kampot. Resident Santenoy also marched with thirty militiamen. After an hour's battle, a Cambodian militiaman of the resident succeeded in penetrating the insurgents' fort, leading to its destruction by French troops and the end of the insurrection.

At the close of 1886, an interview between Norodom and the insurgents was held at Thnol Bek Kus, halfway between Phnom Penh and Kampot, and peace was accomplished.

=== French colony (1889–1940) ===
Under 19th-century French colonial administration, Kampot became a regional administrative centre with the status of a state border district as a result of the delimitation of the Kingdom of Cambodia. The Circonscription Résidentielle de Kampot contained the arrondissements of Kampot, Kompong-Som, Trang, and Kong-Pisey.

In 1889, the French colonial census reported a multi-ethnic community: Kampot town consisted of "Cambodian Kampot" on the Prek-Kampot River and "Chinese Kampot" on the right riverbank of the west branch of the Prek-Thom River. Nearby was also a Vietnamese village, called Tien-Thanh, and another Vietnamese village on Traeuy Koh Island. A Malay enclave also existed on Traeuy Koh Island. Additional villages of mixed ethnicity are listed.

The Chinese population grew steadily, benefiting from pepper cultivation and contributing to the town's economy.

=== Khmer Rouge ===
Kampot became the stage to a major battle of the Vietnam War, also a part of the Cambodian Civil War. From 26 February to 2 April 1974, Cambodian government troops battled Khmer Rouge guerillas for control of Kampot city. Despite the Cambodian army's heavy resistance, the Khmer Rouge eventually captured the city on 2 April. Both sides suffered heavy casualties, and many civilians were rendered homeless.

=== Contemporary history ===
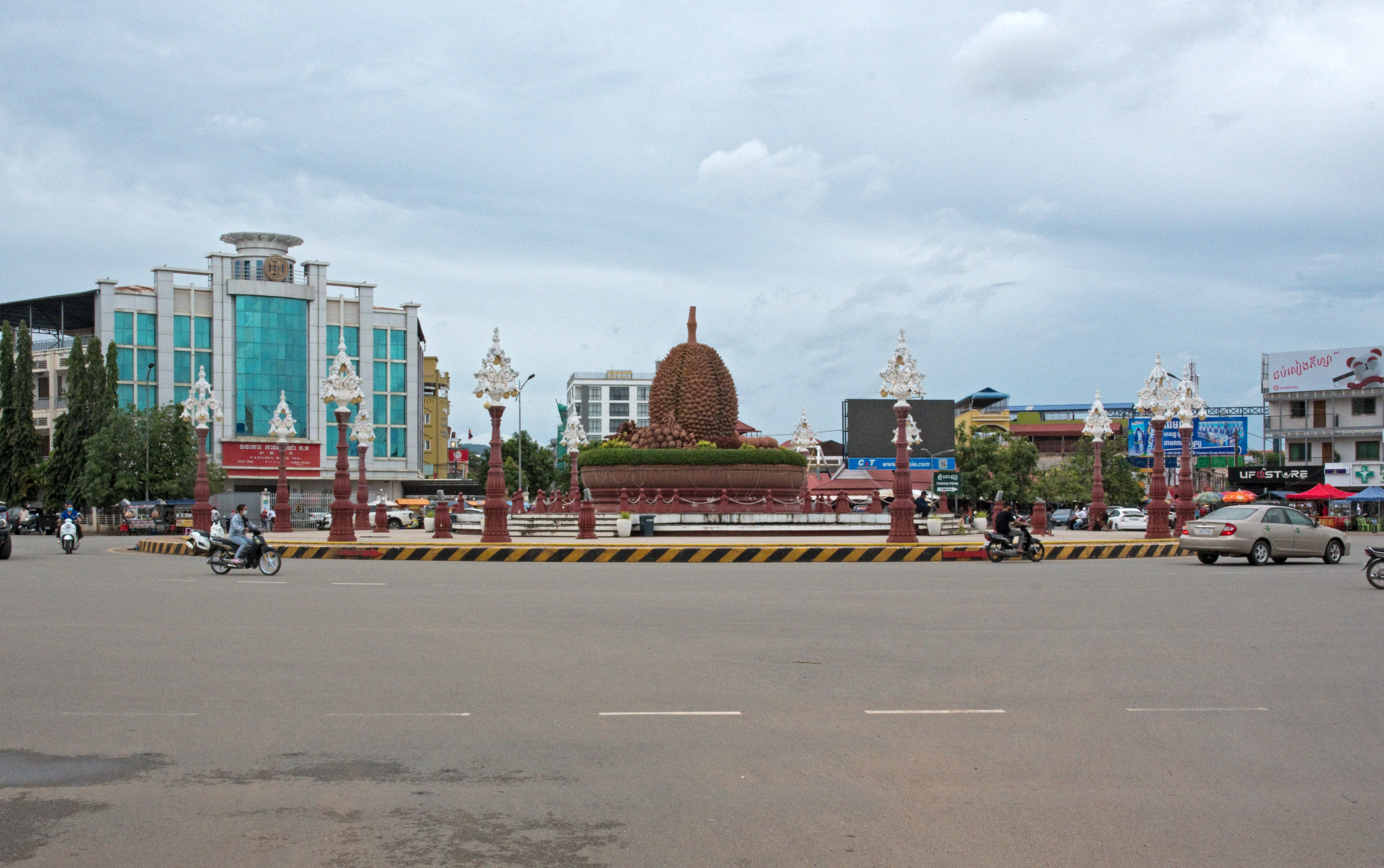
Durian roundabout

Since the 2010s, Kampot has seen an increase in tourism, with the development of a port worth US$8 million under the Kampot Provincial Tourism Department's master plan, set to be completed by 2022. This includes the construction of a 42-story multipurpose twin tower set to be the tallest building in Cambodia outside Phnom Penh when completed; widening and improvements to National Road No. 3; and a seaport carrying passengers to and from nearby Cambodian islands, Thailand, and Vietnam, with the capacity of housing up to 400 passengers. The development has raised concern regarding the impact to colonial buildings that would be demolished to make way for modern infrastructure, the rising price of property, and the destruction of forests. A petition was launched by residents of Kampot, demanding Prime Minister Hun Sen and King Norodom Sihamoni to modify the project toward more heritage-friendly structures and to move the construction of highrise buildings away from Old Town. As of January 2021, it had received 1,239 signatures.

In connection with the Belt and Road Initiative, in May 2022, Shanghai Construction Company and the China Road and Bridge Corporation began developing a Kampot port complex, special economic zone, and related housing and green space.

== Climate ==
Climate data for Kampot (1982–2024)
Month	Jan	Feb	Mar	Apr	May	Jun	Jul	Aug	Sep	Oct	Nov	Dec	Year
Mean daily maximum °C (°F)	31.0 (87.8)	31.6 (88.9)	31.9 (89.4)	33.0 (91.4)	33.5 (92.3)	32.7 (90.9)	32.1 (89.8)	30.7 (87.3)	30.9 (87.6)	30.6 (87.1)	30.6 (87.1)	30.0 (86.0)	31.6 (88.8)
Mean daily minimum °C (°F)	21.4 (70.5)	22.1 (71.8)	23.4 (74.1)	24.2 (75.6)	24.6 (76.3)	24.5 (76.1)	24.2 (75.6)	24.1 (75.4)	23.9 (75.0)	23.5 (74.3)	22.1 (71.8)	21.3 (70.3)	23.3 (73.9)
Average precipitation mm (inches)	23.5 (0.93)	20.8 (0.82)	83.4 (3.28)	123.9 (4.88)	196.4 (7.73)	201.4 (7.93)	247.0 (9.72)	380.7 (14.99)	219.5 (8.64)	242.8 (9.56)	127.6 (5.02)	28.5 (1.12)	1,895.5 (74.62)
Source: World Meteorological Organization

== Demographics ==
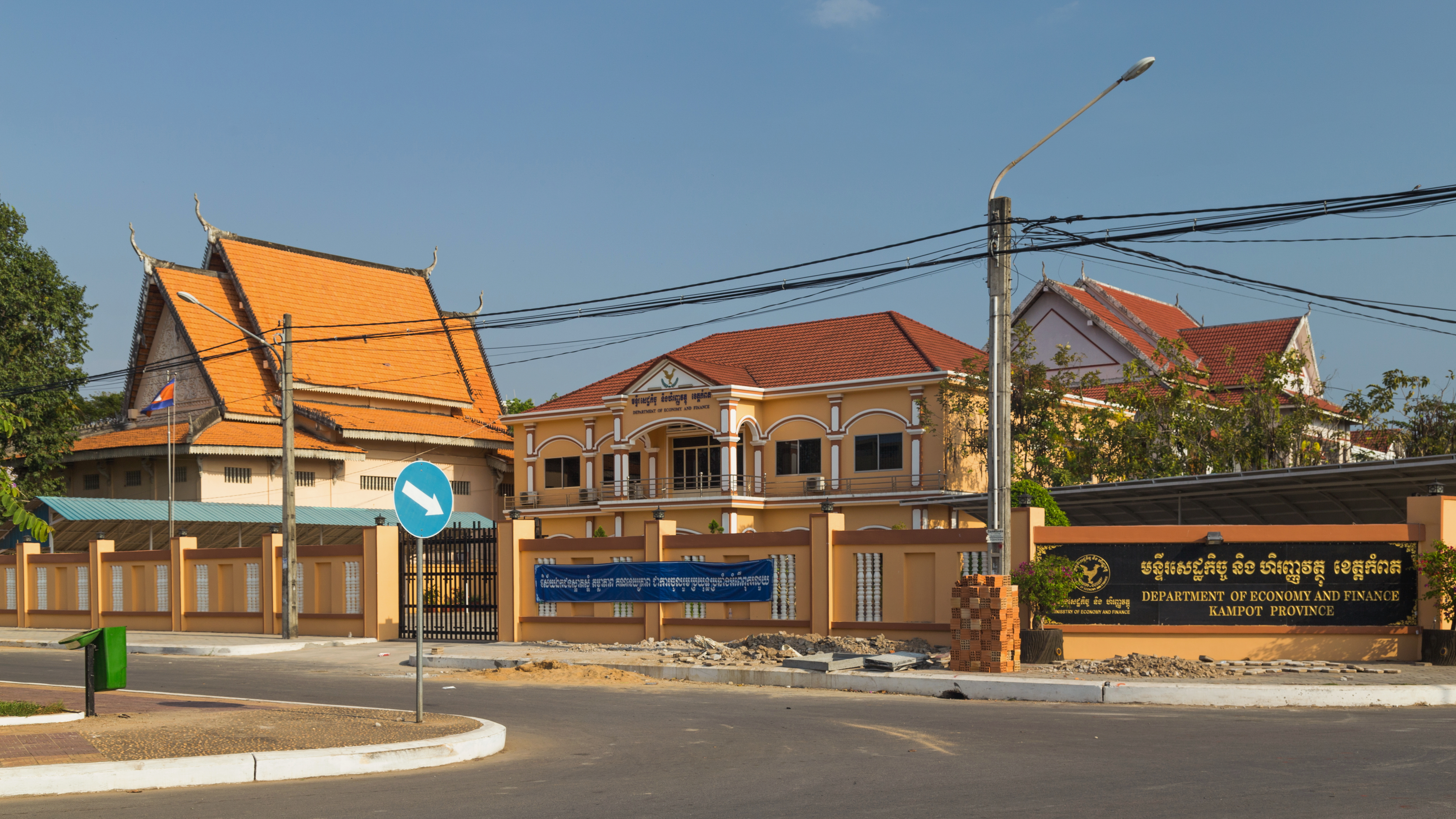
Department of Economy and Finance (Kampot branch)

According to the 2012 census, the population of the municipality of Kampot is 49,597. Historically, there has been a noteworthy presence of Cambodians of Chinese descent in Kampot. Recent years have seen an inflow of Europeans, Vietnamese, and Chinese. A significant part of the population is Cham, a minority Muslim group. The Sa'och tribe, an ancient population group in the province, is on the brink of extinction, however.

== Administration ==
The municipality of Kampot is located in Kampot province and is divided into 15 villages and 5 sangkats, which are:

- Kampong Kandal
- Krang Ampil
- Kampong Bay
- Andong Khmer
- Traeuy Kaoh

== Crime and security ==
Whilst Kampot is considered largely safe, the city has seen a rise in crime against tourists and foreign residents in the 2010s. Despite efforts to provide better security and policing, local authorities have been criticized for their response to a number of high-profile serious crimes, including rapes and murders, that were dealt with poorly. As in neighbouring Sihanoukville, police in Kampot have been accused of corruption, drug trafficking and drug use, and links to organized crime. Some members of Kampot's expatriate community have also faced criticism for alleged attempts to censor, cover up, and control any negative news or reviews about the city, its businesses, and inhabitants, especially on social media groups and pages.

== Gallery ==
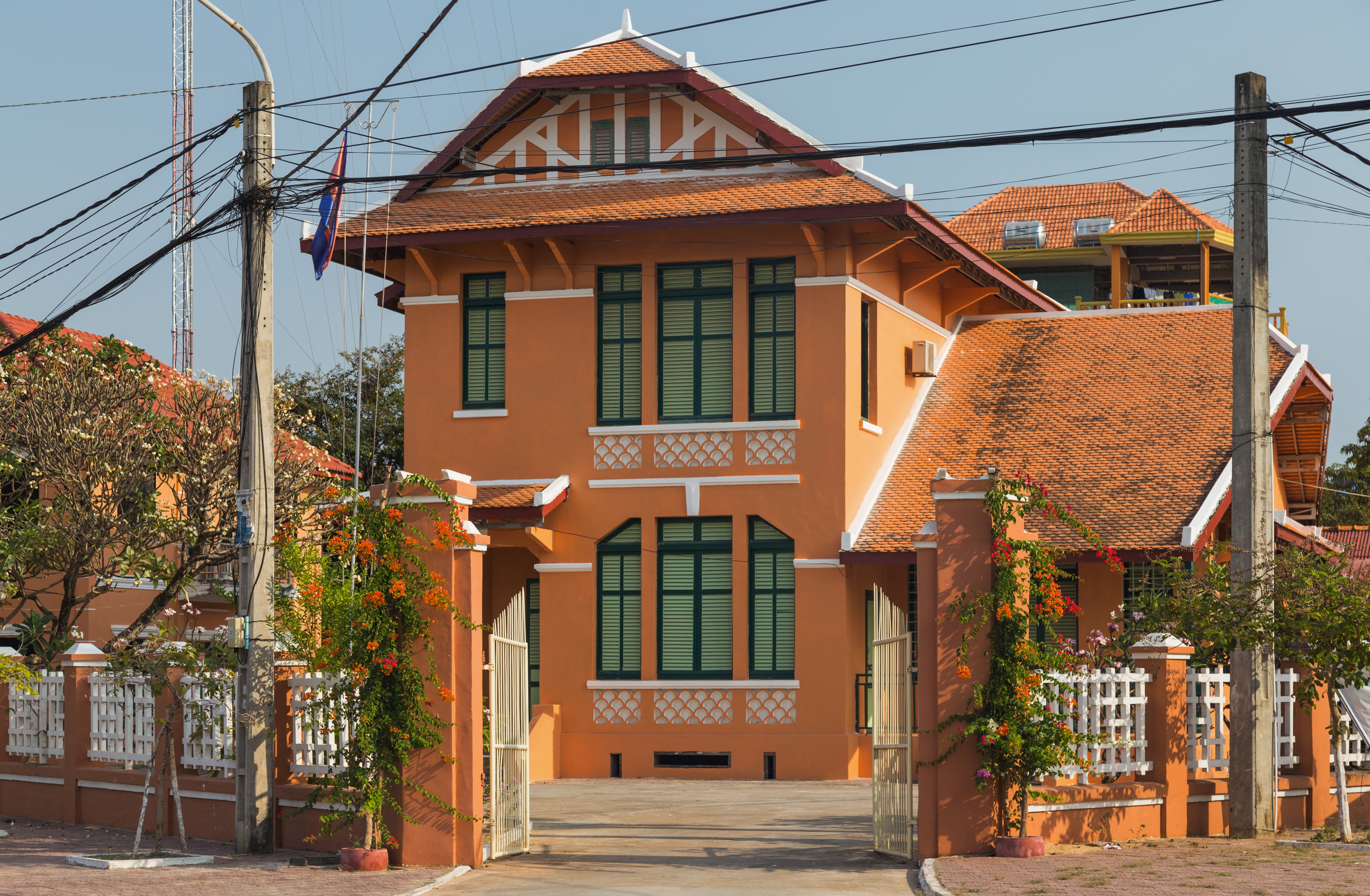
Department of Information, Kampot province

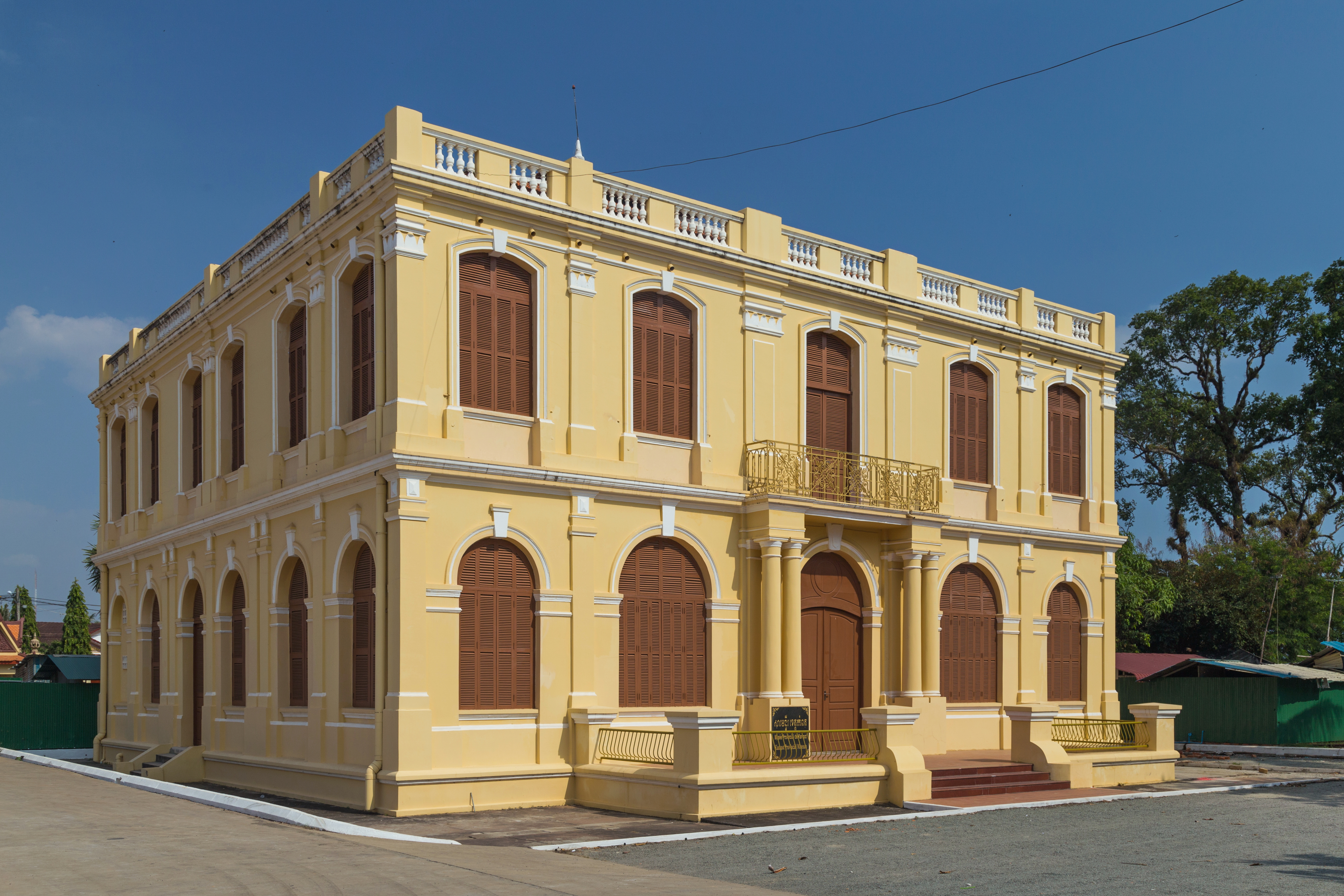
Kampot Provincial Museum

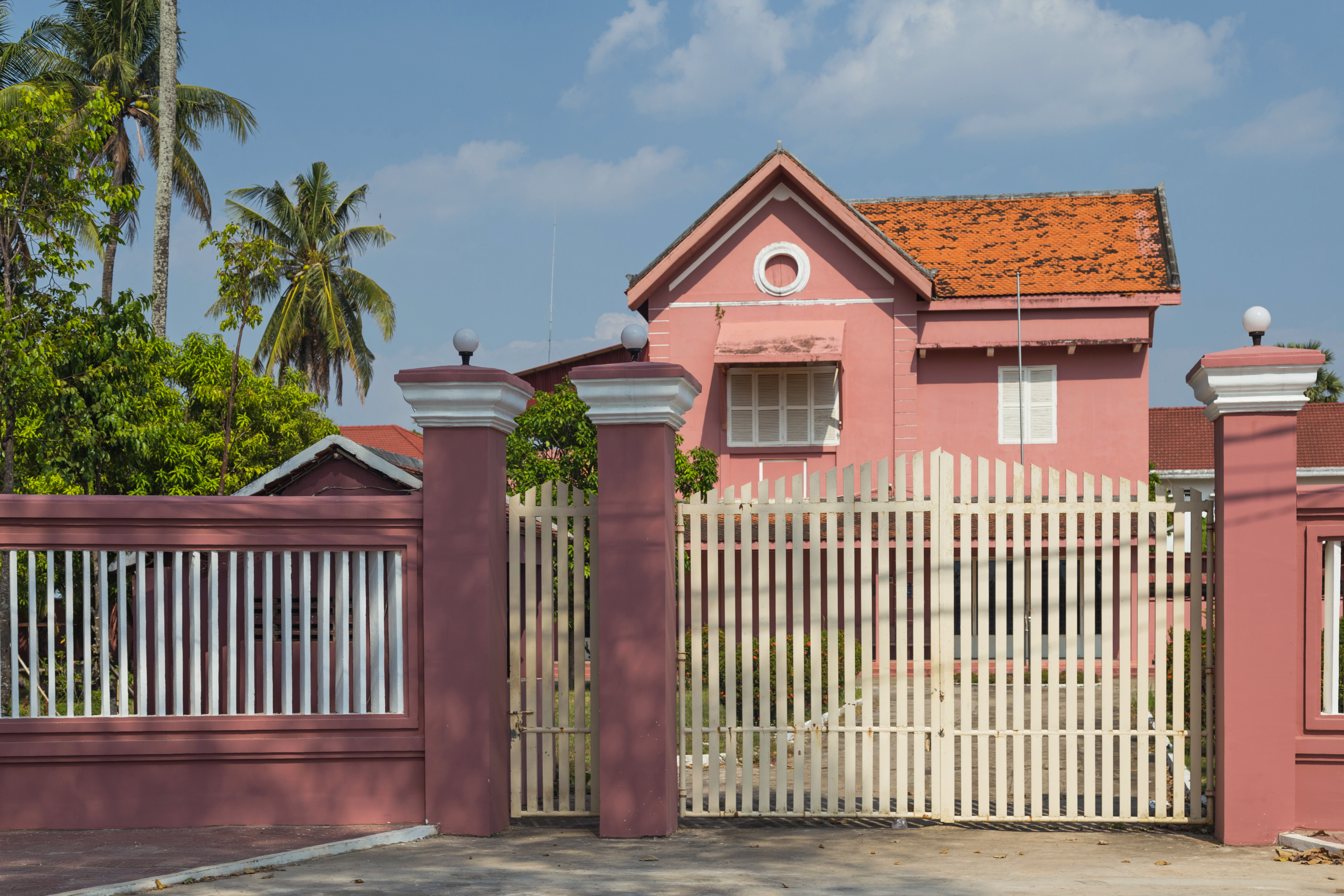
National Bank of Cambodia, Kampot

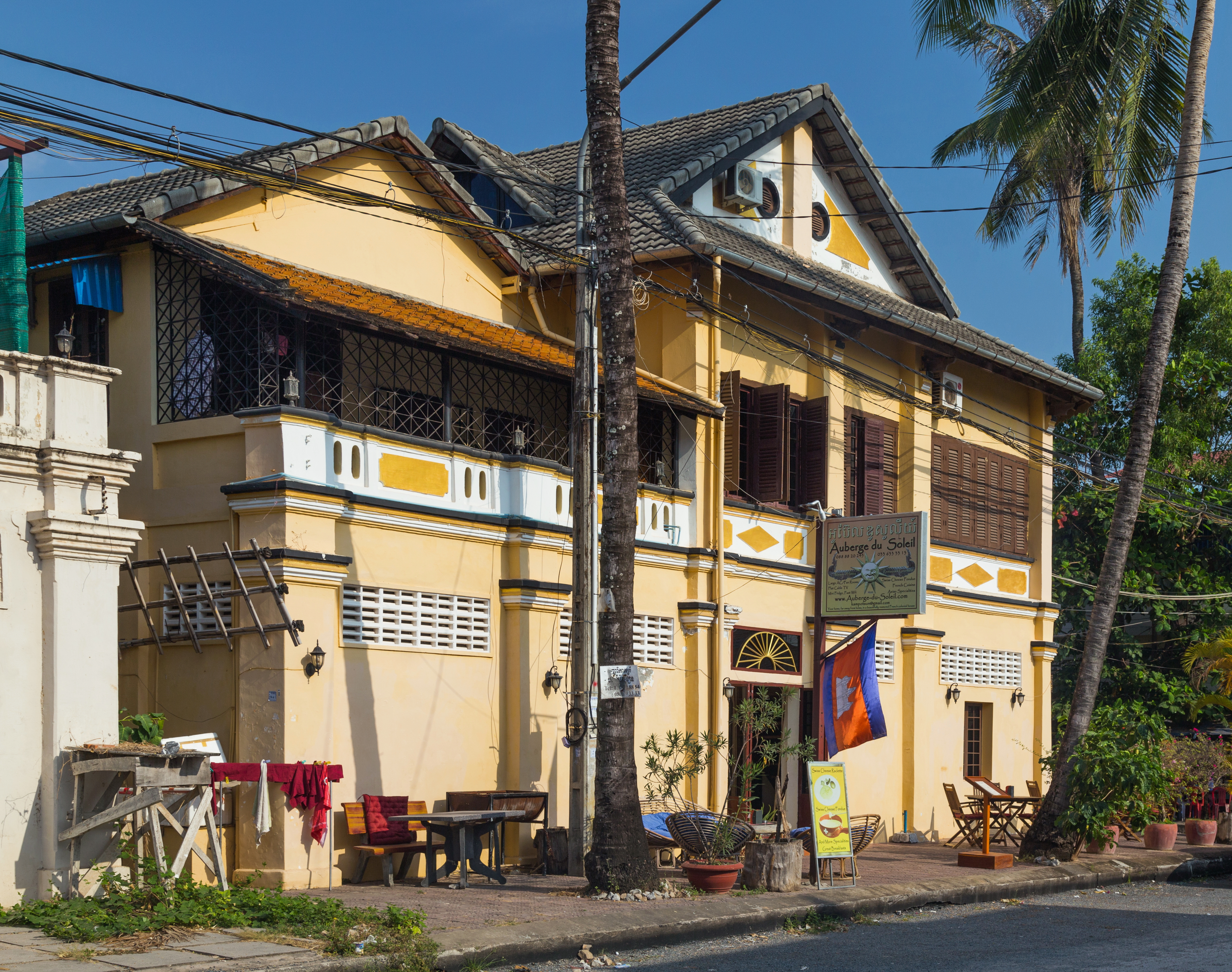
L'Auberge du Soleil

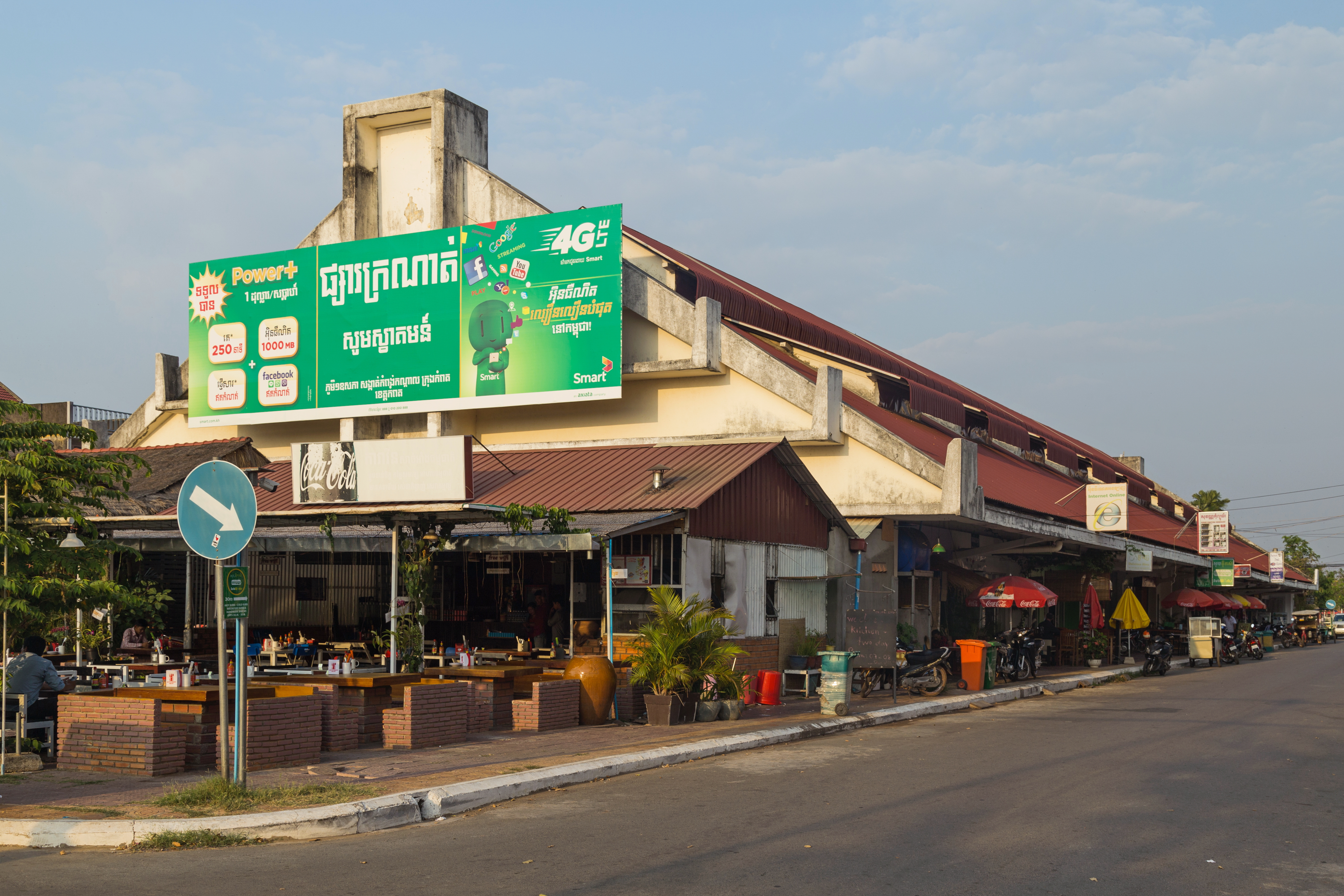
Old market

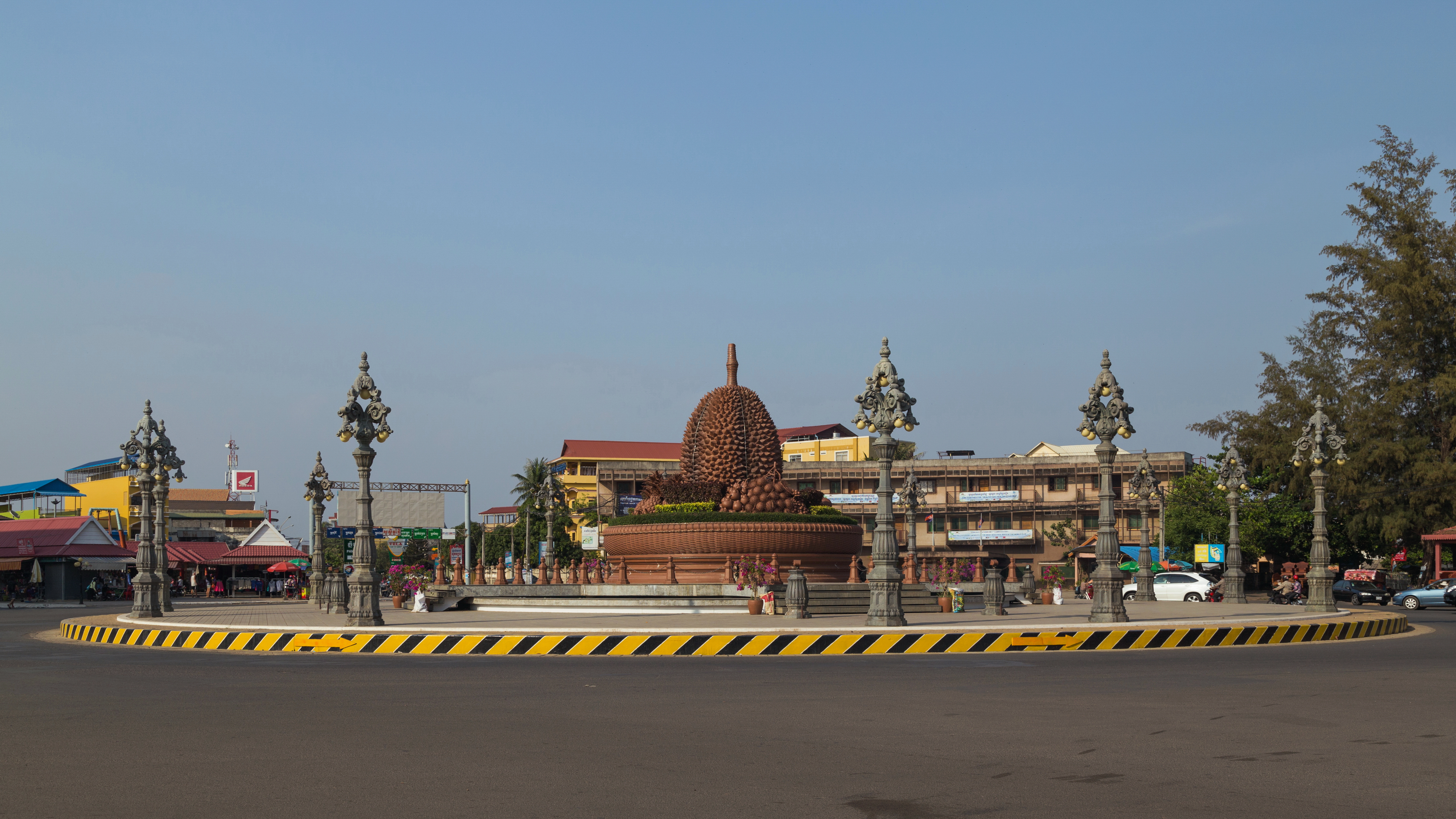
Durian roundabout

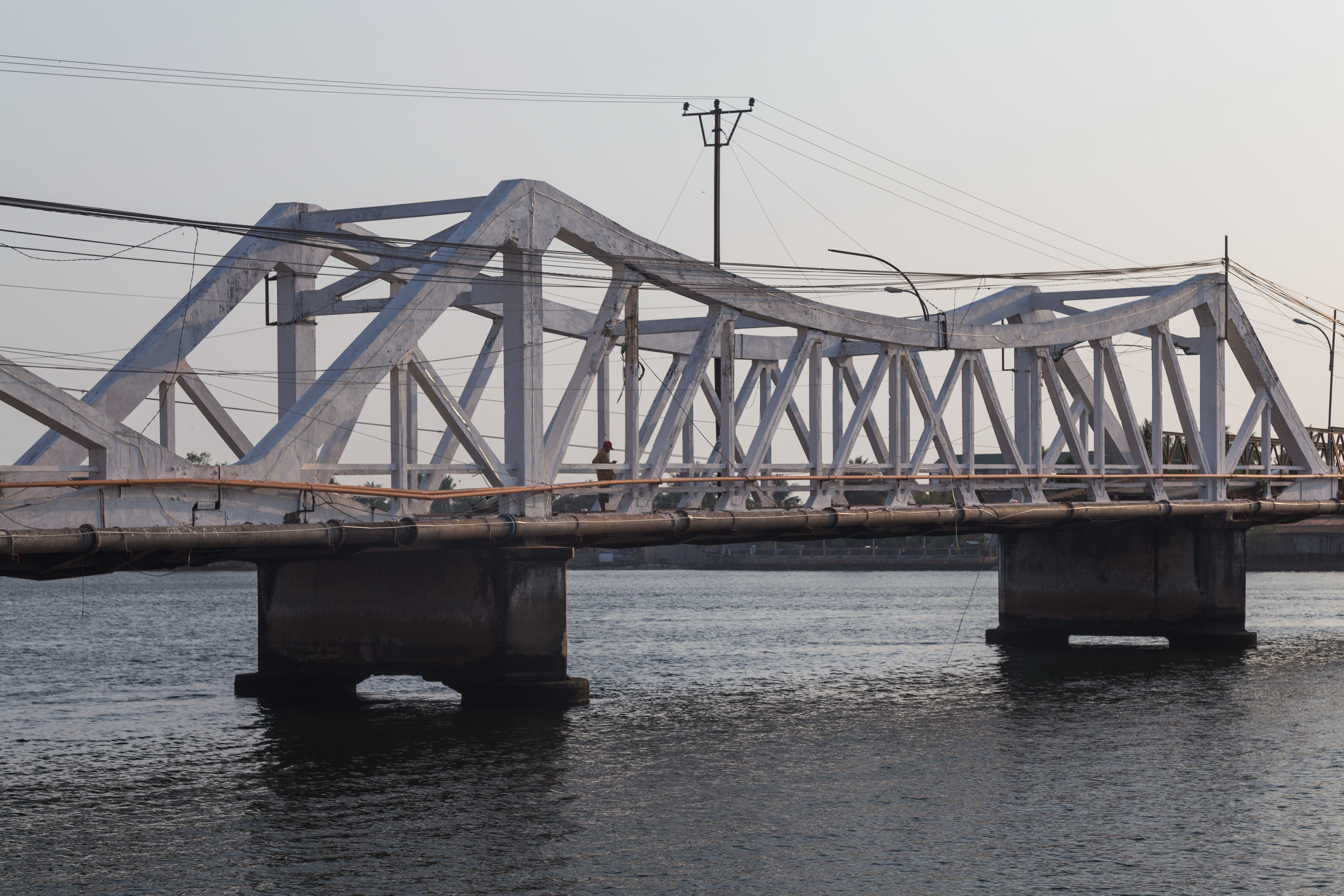
Old bridge

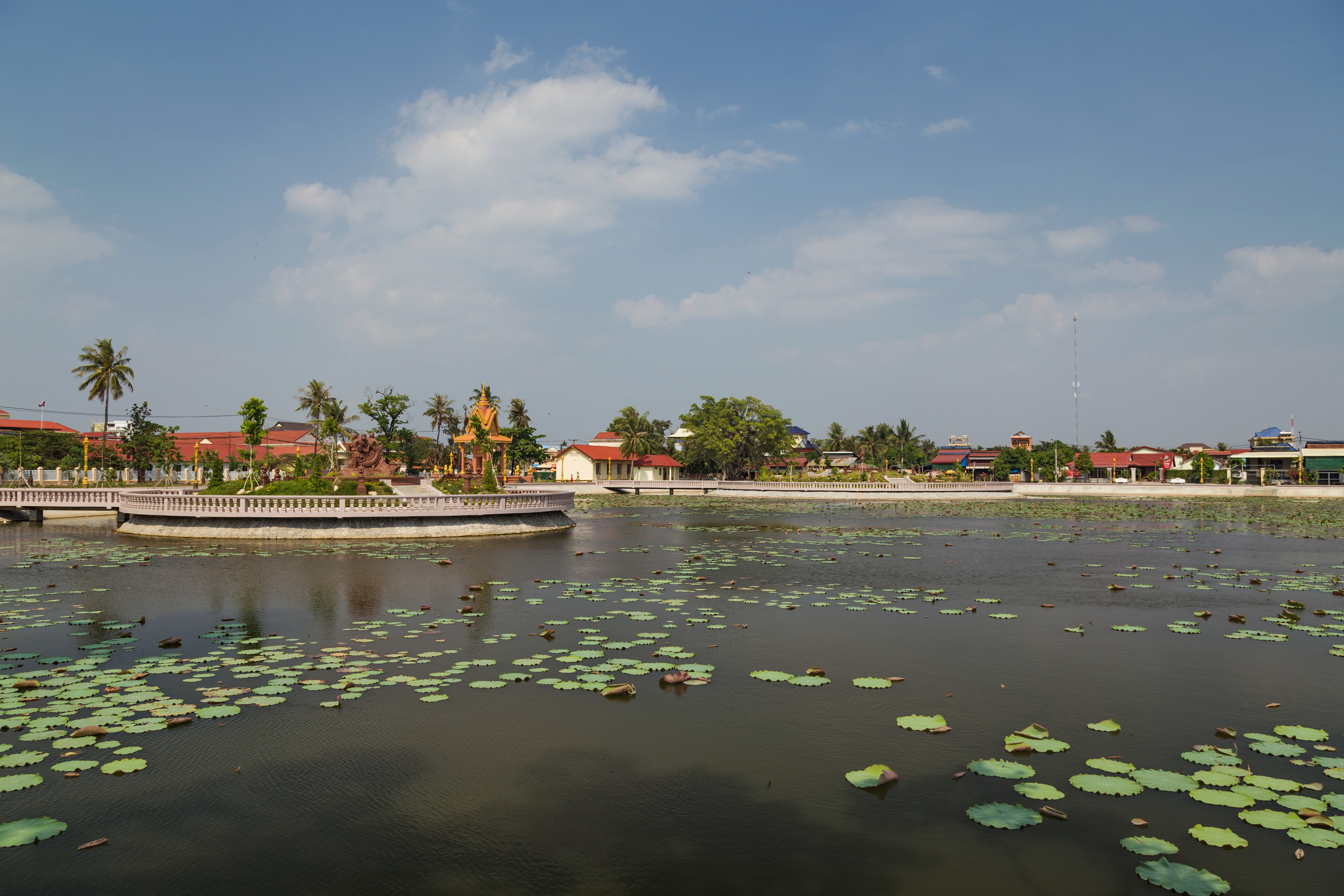
Lotus pond

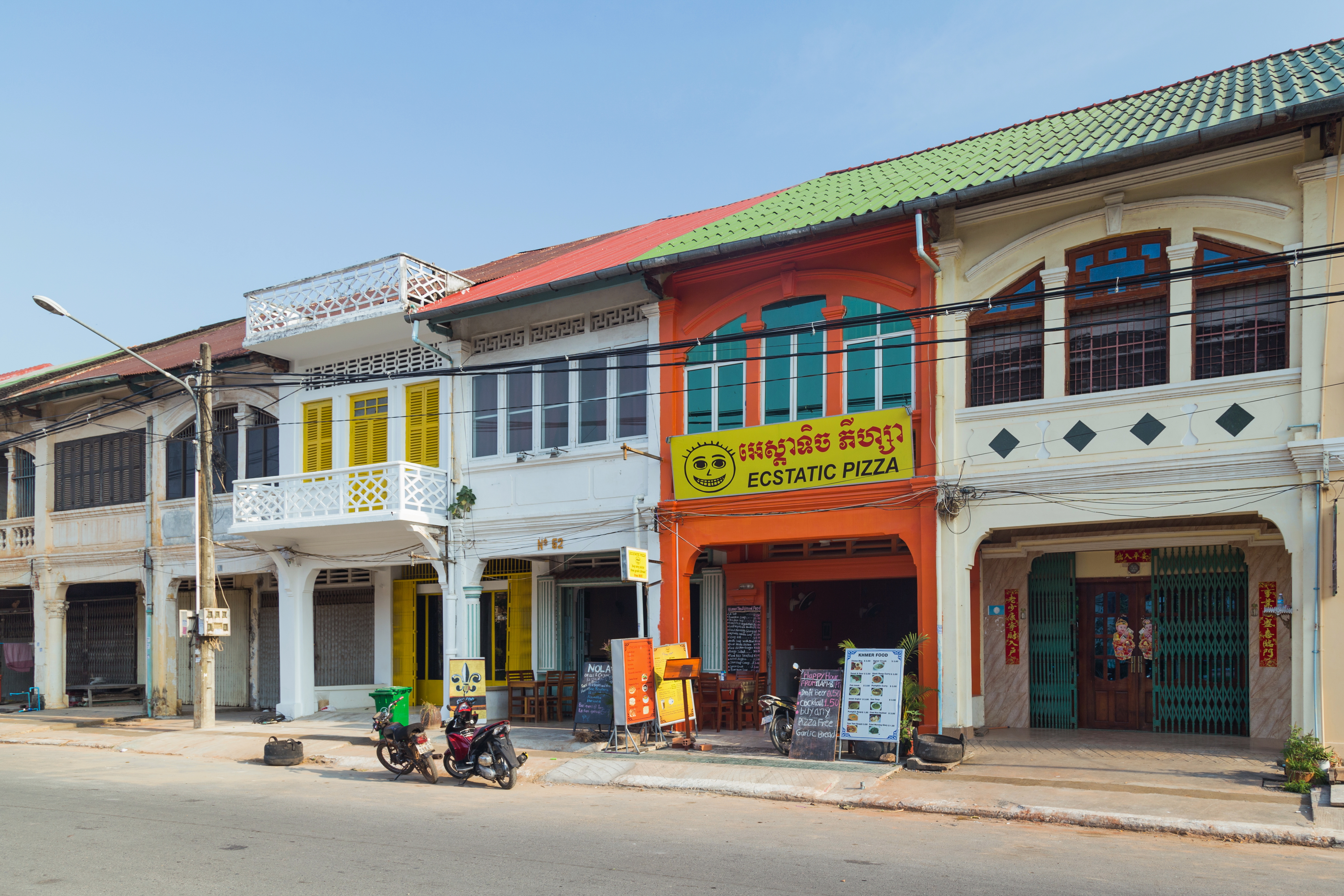
Shophouses

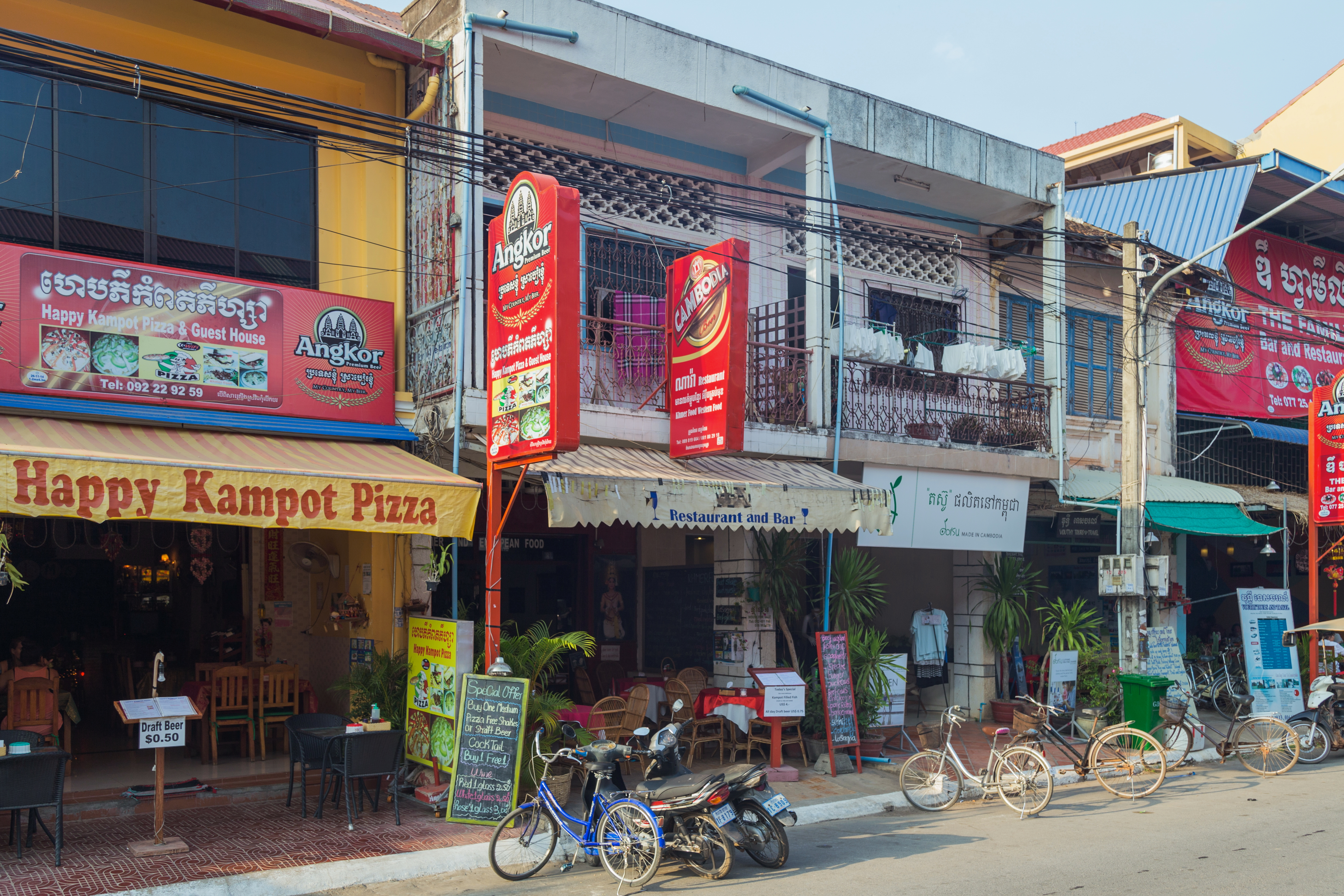
Shops and restaurants

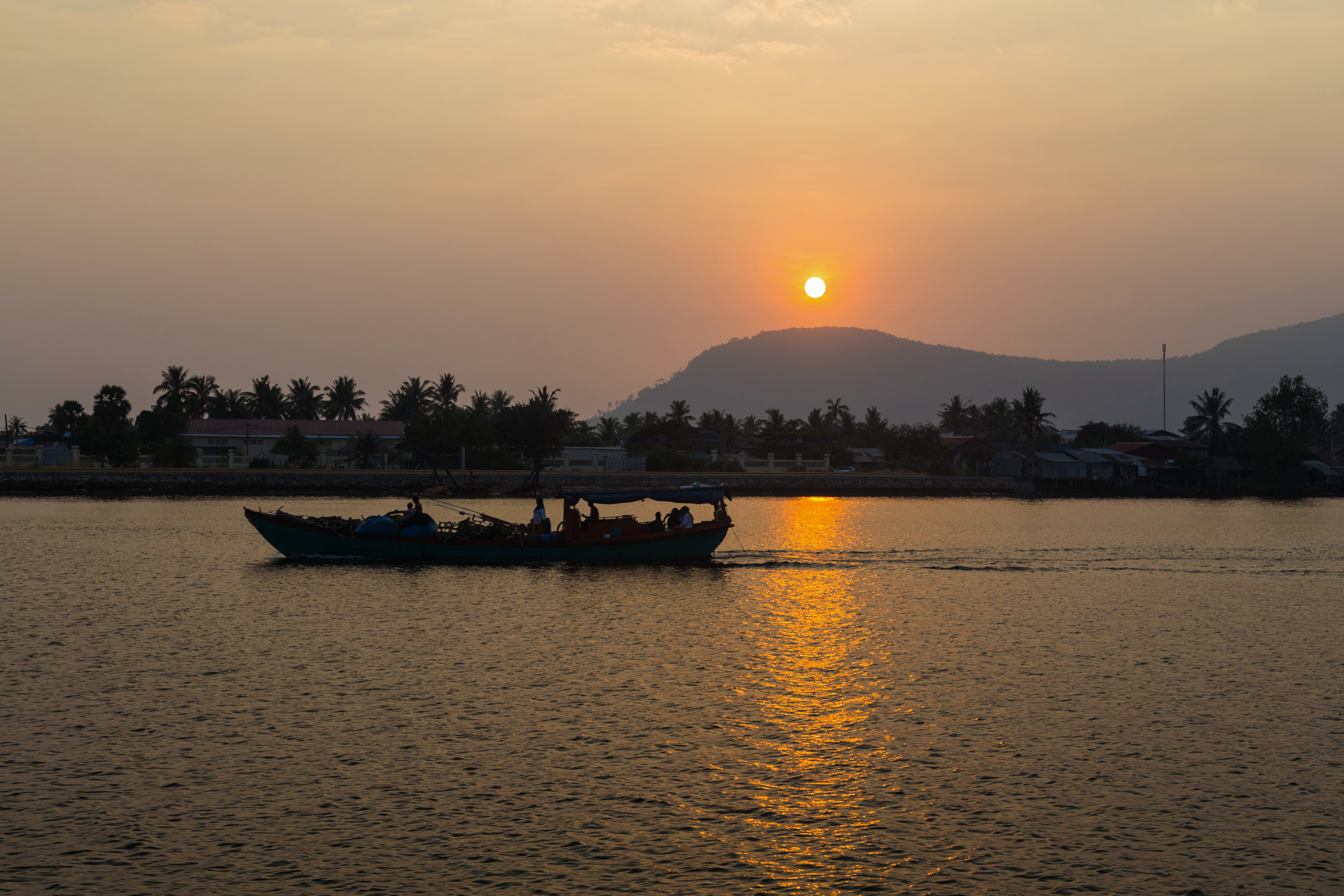
Praek Tuek Chhu River

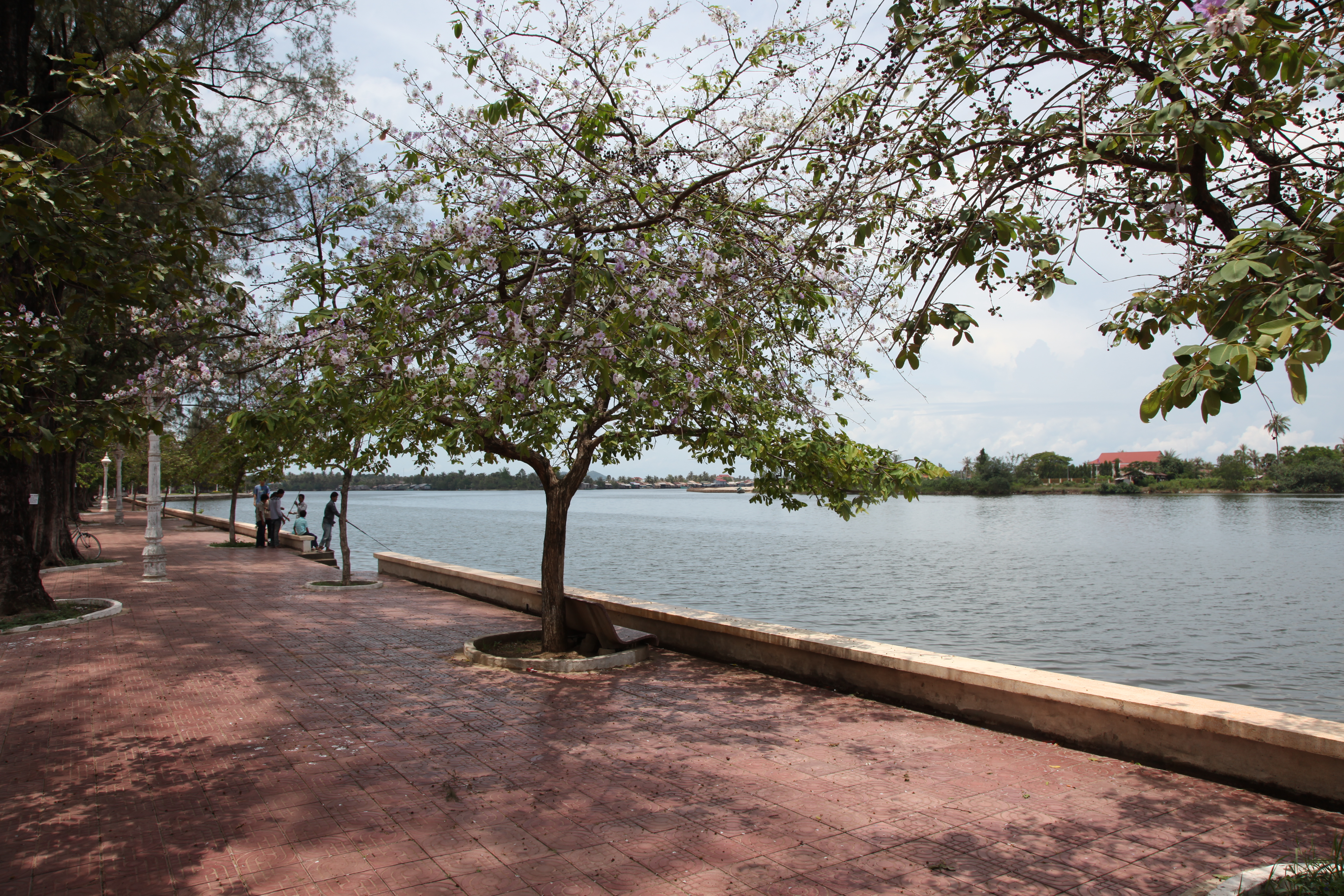
Riverside promenade

== See also ==
- Battle of Kampot
- Svay Rieng City
- Prey Veng City
