= A Leav =

Khmer folktale

A Leav, or Ruong Alev (Khmer : រឿងអាឡេវ), is a popular Khmer narrative which tells the adventures of a gluttonous child who is ready to trick his parents, and ultimately sacrifice them in order to satisfy his appetite.

== Title ==
A Leav is composed of a derogative suffix ah- followed by the substantive -leav (ឡេវ) which literally means the button but which in this context translates as low-class, inferior, despicable, and it is the rank given to the lowest servants of the royal house in Cambodia according to Chuon Nath.

== Summary ==
A Leav is the story of a horrid boy who is greedy for good food. So greedy is he that he tells his father, who is living at some distance from home at the time, that his mother has died and his mother that his father has died, just so as to enjoy two servings of funeral delicacies! He later persuades each separately to marry someone 'very much like the previous spouse' and thus engineers their re-marriage - and a wedding feast for himself. After many more hitches and farcical events, he travels with his father, and comes across Cham merchants approaching, laden with valuable merchandise. Pretending to be afraid for their life, he tell his father to run off, and tricks the Cham into running after his father, while he steals the valuable goods they leave behind.

== Analysis ==
=== A classic folktale of Cambodia ===
A Leav is part of the corpus of Cambodian folktales and narratives.

Translated to French by Guillaume-Henri Monod in 1922, he considered the tale to be representative of a certain type of Khmer wisdom literature and of "the fertility of the Khmer imagination which likes to accumulate incidents, to often complicate situations and to emerge, not without skill, from intrigues which are quite difficult to resolve."

=== A Khmer Till Eulenspiegel ===
Along with Thon Chey, Alev is a Khmer satirical text filled with lies, fabrications and trickery and for that reason it is considered to be a Khmer Till Eulenspiegel. Its translation to French in the 1920s brought a certain degree of exoticism to French literature, as well as it contributed to curb censorship laws which had been particularly strong since the First World War.

Before the emergence of Khmer cartoons in the 1960s, this type of satire was a privileged media for expressing social and political criticism in Cambodia.

The main trait of the main protagonist being gluttony is a possible reference to the modak delicacies of Ganesh and may find an echo in other figures principally characterized by immaturity, obesity and amorality such as Eric Cartman, the fictional character in the adult animated sitcom South Park.
