= Thon Chey =

Khmer legend

Thon Chey, Thmenh Chey, or Dhanañjaya (Khmer: រឿងធនញ្ជ័យ) is the protagonist of a Khmer narrative tradition. He is paired with his symmetrical opposite, A Chey. While insufficient research does not yet allow scholars to identify the oldest known extant publication about the folk hero, its background is set during the Cambodian Golden Age, or the Angkorian era, even though other scholars date it to the 16th- or 17th-century feudal society of Cambodia. The character may have been based on a historical person. According to Khmer scholar Khing Hoc Dy, Thon Chey is "the best-known of all Khmer tales and legends."

== Thon Chey and A Chey: A narrative and its palinode ==
=== The narrative of Thon Chey ===
Thon Chey is the story of a poor village boy who rises first to be the servant of a wealthy man, before become the intendent of the king until he ultimately replaces the king himself. His political ascension is due to his smart wit which always outpasses his consecutive masters. After being exiled to China, he is eventually called back to the Khmer court in order to defeat Chinese envoys who are trying to subjugate the Khmer kingdom, and through his wisdom, once again, Thon Chey is victorious. Finally, he falls into demise, and his enemies defecate on his tomb, not knowing that Thon Chey had previously planted spikes around his burial ground, thus outwitting his enemies even beyond his own death. These various episodes are only the most common among many variants in what Khmerologist Thierry Solange calls "a novel with many drawers".

=== The narrative of A Chey ===
In a literary palinode, the narrative of A Chey mirrors in a negative light any good deed displayed by Thon Chey. Whatever Thon Chey accomplished through his wit, A Chey manages to mess up through his avidity and his clumsiness.

== Interpretation ==
=== An urban legend: The literary legacy of Jayavarman VII ===
While the legend of Thon Chey exists in Thailand as Si Thanoncai or in Laos as Xien Mien, Trang Quynh in Viêtnam, and even Ida Talaga in Bali as well, it has been passed on from one generation to another by oral tradition only it seems. The earliest written sources are foreign sources about the legend of Thon Chey. They can be found in the French translations of Etienne Aymonier, Guillaume-Henri Monod, and Pierre Bitard. Recent Khmer literary studies have attempted to prove the anquity of this narrative by linking the narrative of Thon Chey to the contrasted memory of King Jayavarman VII. In fact, while the royal name of Jayavarman VII was discovered anew through the archeological study of Khmer inscriptions, Thon Chey may be a nickname of Chey-varman. In fact, his reign also corresponds to increased relations with China, as documented by the embassy of Chinese envoy Zhou Daguan. The relative demise of Jayavarman VII after his death, with the rejection of Mahayana Buddhism which he favored, contrasts with the constant amazement for his mausoleum at the Bayon temple finds an echo in the narrative of Thon Chey.

=== A Khmer exemplum: The virtues of Thon Chey ===
More than anything else, the narrative of Thon Chey is a Khmer exemplum of political virtue. His wit could be compared to other cunning tricksters such as Loki, in Norse mythology, or Scapin the Schemer in 17th-century French literature. In all things, Thon Chey is victorious despite his humble origin and the fierce opposition he has from his detractors. His actions as his sayings are framed in such a way that they are part of a certain wisdom literature of Cambodia. For that reason, his character has been described as the "Cambodian Eulenspiegel."

=== A Khmer satire: The demise of A Chey ===
On the opposite hand, Thon Chey is turned into A Chey in a farcical cycle where the hero becomes a royal buffoon or jester. The epononymic title "A Chey" with its "a-" prefix is itself derogatory in Khmer language. It is common in ancient Khmer literature that the figure of the king be ridiculed, as in the legend of Trasak Paem. While political satire is a common style in Southeast Asia and connections have been made to the Indonesian story of Hang Tuah, the duo of Thon Chey and A Chey is probably the most ancient example of its genre in Cambodian literature and for that reason has been referred to also in contemporary politics and literature. Along with another Khmer satire known as A Leav, Pierre Bitard sees it as a local version of the picaresque novel Lazarillo de Tormes.

Thus, Cambodian author Soth Polin referred his book, L'Anarchiste, as a palimpsest inspired by Thon Chey in order to express his criticism of King Norodom Sihanouk:

The king tells [Thon Chey], "I don't want to see your face, so get lost!" When the King passes by again, Thmenh Chey doesn't offer his face, but his backside. That book was like offering my backside to the king. I didn't write aboute Thmenh Chey, but I stole his style of being revolutionary, of indirectly criticizing the king.

— Soth Polin

In 2018, Cambodian politician Sam Rainsy failed to adopt Thon Chey's Khmer delicacy as a symbol of resistance before it was suggested by the ruling government as a Cambodian dish for UNESCO World Heritage.

== Culture ==
Thon Chey has become a Cambodian classic novel which is taught both in high schools and in language schools for foreign students as well. It has a large impact of various sectors of Khmer culture.

=== The delicacy of Thon Chey: nom banhchok ===
Thon Chey is remembered in Cambodian popular cuisine through the Khmer delicacy known as nom banhchok, lightly fermented Cambodian rice noodles and a breakfast noodle dish, of which the legend says that Thon Chey was the inventor.

=== Thon Chey in Khmer cinema and theater ===
Thon Chey inspired Cambodian cinema with its epic narrative and humorous riddles. It was brought to the big screen for the first time during the Golden Age of Cambodian cineman during the Sangkum era of the 1960s. A remake of Thon Chey was produced once more in 2002 on a $20,000 budget.
