= Kampot sea salt =

Salt from southern Cambodia

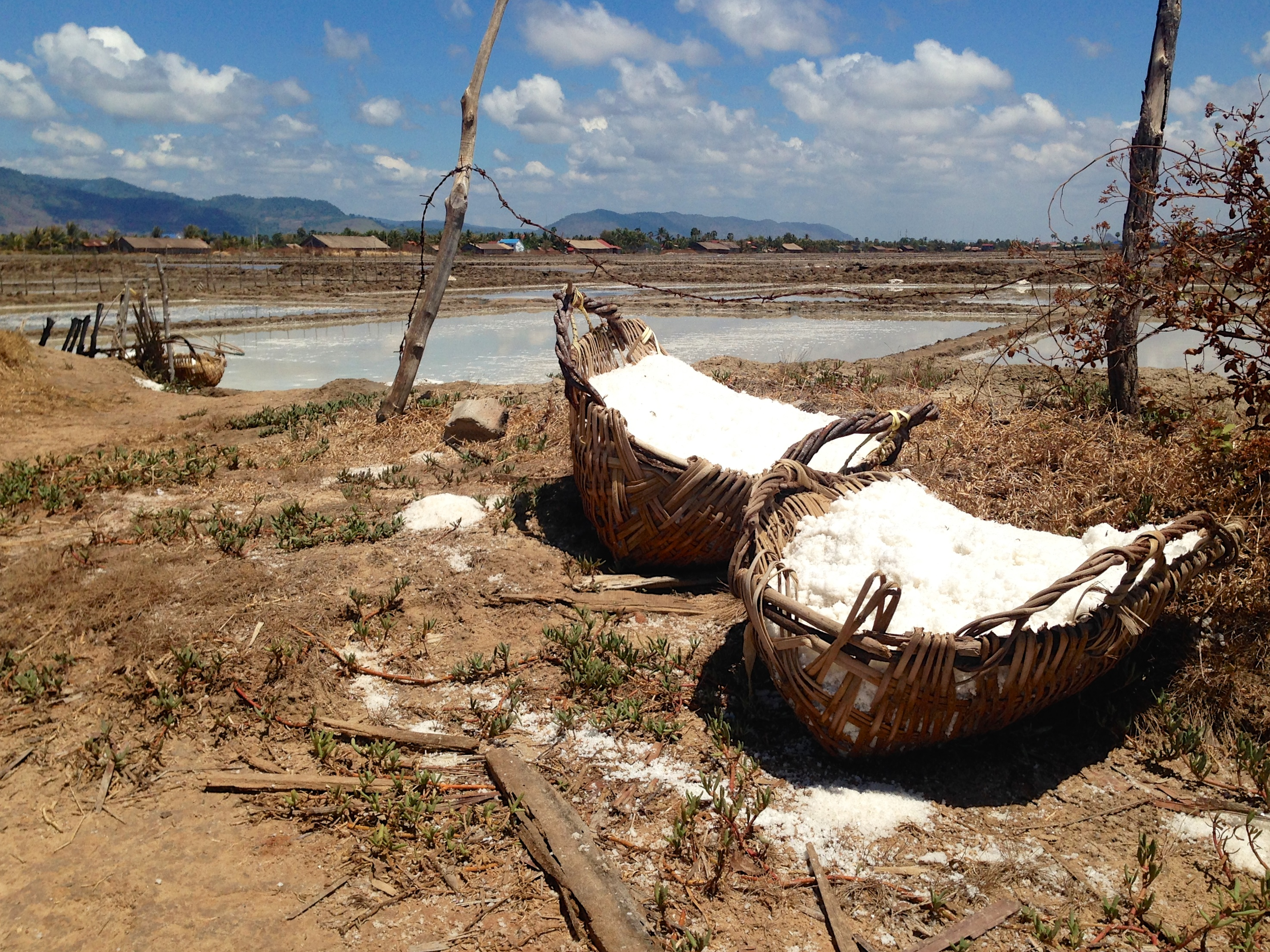
Baskets of Kampot sea salt with salt evaporation ponds in the background.

Kampot sea salt (Khmer: អំបិលសមុទ្រកំពត, French: Sel de mer de Kampot) is extracted from the seawater through salt evaporation ponds in the coastal Kampot and Kep provinces. Salt farms cover around 4,748 hectares of land in both provinces and are owned by 200 families who are members of Kampot-Kep Salt Association.

The highest quality Kampot sea salt is Kampot Flower of Salt (ផ្កាអំបិលកំពត, Fleur de sel de Kampot), the fleur de sel harvested in small quantities from each pond only during April and May, the warmest months of the year, when there is little to no wind.

== History ==
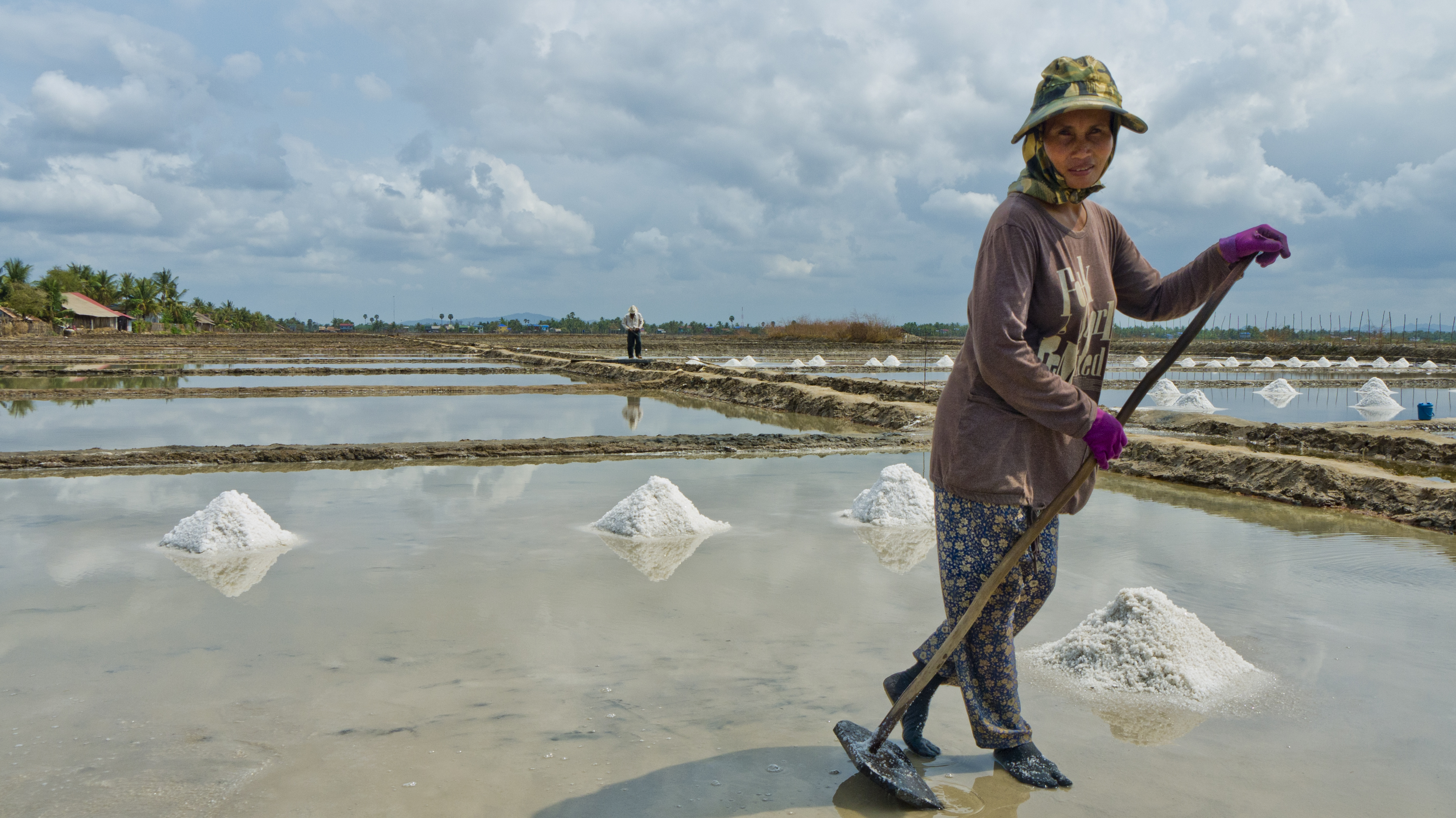
A woman working the salt fields in Kampot.

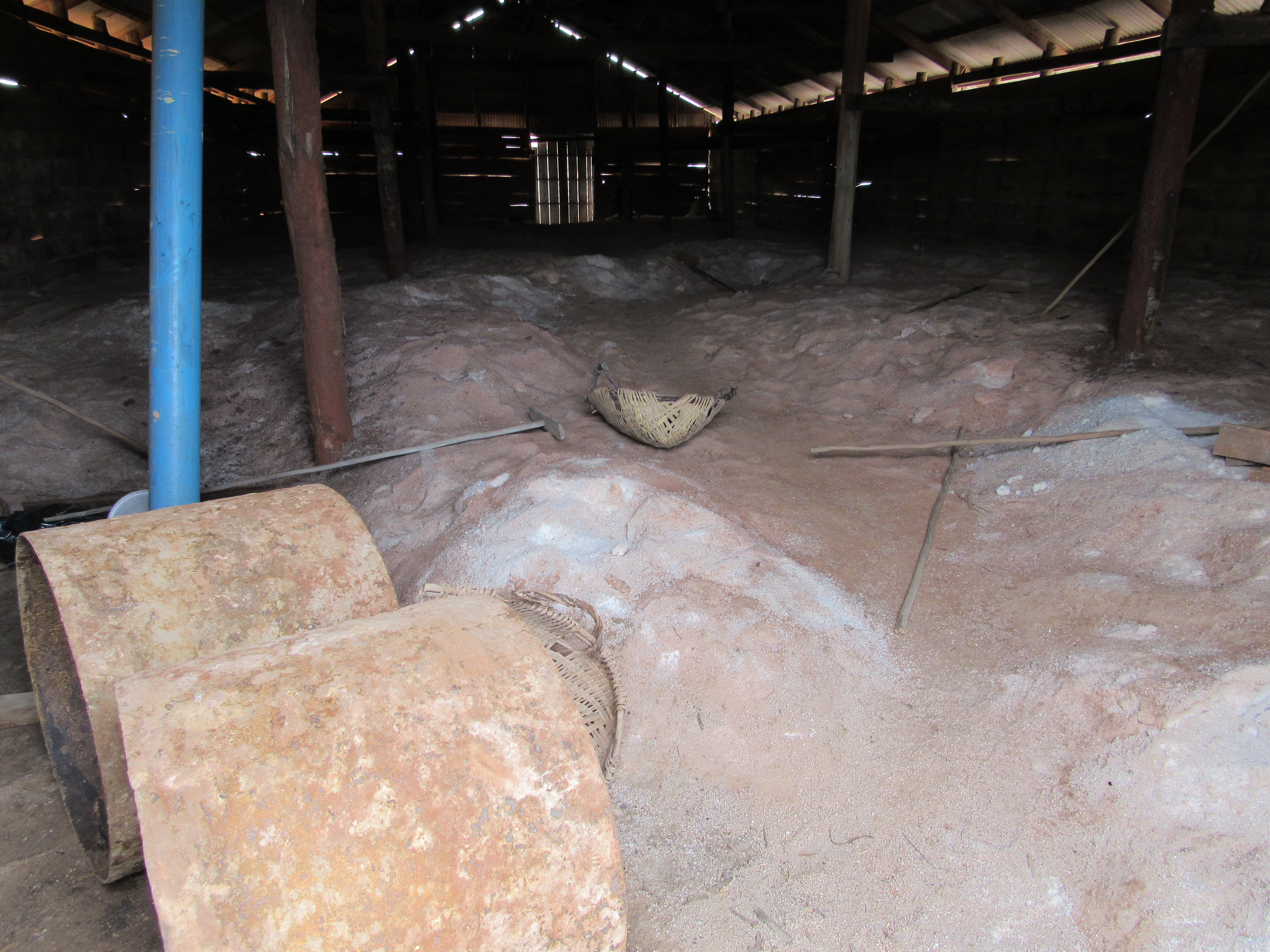
Kampot sea salt storage.

Salt production has a long history in the region, but the industry grew rapidly in the 1940s and 1950s. During the Khmer Rouge and the subsequent Cambodian Civil War salt production was nationalized. In 1986, a group of Kampot residents were granted 50 hectares of land by the state and given permission to start salt production as private entrepreneurs.

In 2014, due to the favourable weather conditions and extended harvest season, 147,000 tonnes of Kampot sea salt were collected, almost double last year's harvest of 80,000 tonnes. In 2015, the even longer dry season allowed for the harvest of 170,000 tonnes of salt, increasing the amount of the country's Kampot sea salt reserves to 270,000 tonnes. The amount of harvested Kampot sea salt dropped to 140,000 tonnes in 2016. In 2017, an export contract between local producer Confirel Co Ltd and French company Le Guerandais was signed for 20 tonnes of unprocessed raw Kampot sea salt for a price of 58 USD per tonne, marking the first-ever export contract for a Kampot sea salt producer.

In 2018, to tackle iodine deficiency among its population, the government of Cambodia banned the sale of non-iodized salt in Cambodia from 2019, while salt ionization had already been made mandatory for Cambodian salt producers since 2003.

In the late 2010s, the Cambodian salt producers were reporting that the changing weather patterns and rising sea level caused by global warming were negatively affecting the Kampot salt production. A record low of 18,430 tonnes of Kampot sea salt could be harvested in 2019. Due to the dwindling income some Cambodian salt producers began to sell their salt farms and the children of salt workers were increasingly forced to drop out of school, prompting the Ministry of Industry, Science, Technology and Innovation of Cambodia to set up a working group in 2021 to tackle the issue. In 2022, the ministry presented a 2022–2026 salt development strategy to develop, manage and preserve salt farms, as well improve the economic efficiency of salt production.

== See also ==
- Kampot fish sauce
- Kampot pepper
