= Kampot fish sauce =

Cambodian variety of fish sauce

Kampot fish sauce (Khmer: ទឹកត្រីកំពត) is a variety of fish sauce from Kampot Province, Cambodia produced by fermenting saltwater fish with Kampot sea salt. The largest producer of Kampot fish sauce is E Che Ngov Heng Food Production of Kampot at Ta Ang village, which produces 10,000 litres of fish sauce per day, fermenting it in traditional wooden containers for up to two years.

In 2021, Ministry of Commerce of Cambodia had created a working group and started the evaluation of Kampot fish sauce as a potential Geographical indication (GI). In 2022, Kampot Municipality had 10 fish sauce producers and Kampot-Kep Fish Sauce Production Association was in the process of being registered to allow for the recognition of Kampot fish sauce as a GI in order to promote its export. Two days after Cambodia-Korea Free Trade Agreement took effect on December 1, E Chei Ngov Heng Food Production of Kampot was visited by a delegation of Korea Importers Association looking into the potential exporting of Kampot fish sauce to South Korea. On 31 January, 2023, Ministry of Commerce reported that the GI registration for Kampot fish sauce was in the final stages.

== See also ==
- Kampot sea salt
- Kampot pepper
