= List of horror films of 2024 =

This is a list of horror films that were released in 2024. This list includes films that are classified as horror as well as other subgenres. They are listed in alphabetical order.

== Highest-grossing horror films of 2024 ==
Highest-grossing horror films of 2024
Rank	Title	Distributor	Worldwide gross	Ref.
1	Beetlejuice Beetlejuice	Warner Bros. Pictures	$452 million	
2	Alien: Romulus	20th Century Studios	$350.9 million	
3	A Quiet Place: Day One	Paramount Pictures	$261.9 million	
4	Nosferatu	Focus Features	$182.1 million	
5	Smile 2	Paramount Pictures	$138.1 million	
6	Longlegs	Neon	$128 million	
7	Exhuma	Showbox	$93.9 million	
8	Terrifier 3	Cineverse / Iconic Events	$90.4 million	
9	The Substance	Mubi	$77.3 million	
10	Heretic	A24	$60 million	

== List of horror films of 2024 ==
Horror films released in 2024
Title	Director	Cast	Country	Subgenre	Ref.
9 Windows	Lou Simon	William Forsythe, Diana Garle, Jason Hignite, Christopher Millan, Michael Paré	United States	Screenlife Crime Horror	
A Different Man	Aaron Schimberg	Sebastian Stan, Renate Reinsve, Adam Pearson	United States	Psychological thriller	
A Quiet Place: Day One	Michael Sarnoski	Lupita Nyong'o, Joseph Quinn, Alex Wolff, Djimon Hounsou, Denis O'Hare	United States	Sci-fi horror	
A Stranger in the Woods	József Gallai	Bill Oberst Jr., Laura Ellen Wilson, Lynn Lowry, Shawn Michael Clankie	United States	Found footage Horror	
Abigail	Matt Bettinelli-Olpin, Tyler Gillett	Melissa Barrera, Dan Stevens, Alisha Weir, Kathryn Newton, William Catlett, Kevin Durand, Angus Cloud Giancarlo Esposito	United States	monster Horror	
Afraid	Chris Weitz	Katherine Waterston, John Cho, Lukita Maxwell	United States	Horror	
Alien: Romulus	Fede Álvarez	Cailee Spaeny, Isabela Merced, David Jonsson, Spike Fearn, Aileen Wu, Archie Renaux	United States	Science fiction Horror	
AMFAD All My Friends Are Dead	Marcus Dunstan	Jade Pettyjohn, JoJo Siwa	United States	Slasher	
Amityville AI	Matt Jaissle	Tommy Bellair, Bradford Blair, Paul Bradford	United States	Science fiction Horror	
Amityville Backpack	Evan Jacobs	Mike Hartsfield, Lindy Hartsfield, Paul Bradford	United States	Horror	
Amityville Bigfoot	Shawn C. Phillips	Eric Roberts, Tuesday Knight, Lorelei Linklater	United States	Horror Comedy Thriller	
Amityville Turkey Day	Will Collazo Jr., Julie Anne Prescott	Mark C. Fullhardt, Steven Kiseleski, Jen Elyse Feldy	United States	Black comedy Supernatural Horror	
Amityville Webcam	Brandon Farmer	Brandon Farmer, Jacob A. Varney, David Strege, Kyle Rappaport, Moesly Volpe, Filip Hanzek	United States	Comedy Horror	
Amityville: Where the Echo Lives	Carlos Ayala	Carlos Ayala, Nick Barelli, Hector de Alva	United States	Horror	
Amityville Void			United States	Found footage Horror	
Anaconda	Hesheng Xiang, Qiuliang Xiang	Terence Yin, Nita Lei, Xingchen Wang	China	Monster Adventure	
Anathema	Jimina Sabadú	Leonor Watling, Pablo Derqui, Jaime Ordóñez, Manuel de Blas	Spain	Supernatural gothic horror	
Animale	Emma Benestan	Oulaya Amamra, Damien Rebattel, Vivien Rodriguez	Saudi Arabia, Belgium, France	Drama Horror	
Apartment 7A	Natalie Erika James	Julia Garner, Jim Sturgess, Dianne Wiest	United States	Psychological thriller	
Apocalypse Z: The Beginning of the End	Carles Torrens	Francisco Ortiz	Spain	Zombie Action Thriller	
Arcadian	Ben Brewer	Nicolas Cage, Jaeden Martell, Maxwell Jenkins	United States, Ireland, Canada	Action Horror	
Azrael	E. L. Katz	Samara Weaving	United States	Action Horror	
Bantay-Bahay	Jose Javier Reyes	Pepe Herrera	Philippines	Comedy horror	
Banished	Joseph Sims-Dennett	Meg Eloise-Clarke, David Beelen, Steve Brekalow	Australia	Folk horror	
Beetlejuice Beetlejuice	Tim Burton	Michael Keaton, Winona Ryder, Catherine O'Hara, Jenna Ortega, Justin Theroux, Monica Bellucci, Willem Dafoe	United States	Fantasy comedy	
Bhootpori	Soukarya Ghosal	Jaya Ahsan, Ritwick Chakraborty, Shantilal Mukherjee, Sudipta Chakraborty, Bishantak Mukherjee	India	Horror fantasy	
Blackwater Lane	Jeff Celentano	Minka Kelly, Maggie Grace, Dermot Mulroney	United States	Supernatural horror	
Blink Twice	Zoë Kravitz	Naomi Ackie, Channing Tatum	United States	Thriller	
Blood Star	Lawrence Jacomelli	John Schwab, Britni Camacho, Sydney Brumfield, Travis Lincoln Cox, Felix Merback, Wyomi Reed, Brandon Brown	United States	Horror Thriller	
Bloody Axe Wound	Matthew John Lawrence	Sari Arambulo, Molly Brown, Billy Burke, Jeffrey Dean Morgan	United States	Horror Slasher Comedy	
Bloodline Killer	Ante Novakovic	Bruce Dern, Tyrese Gibson, Shawnee Smith, Taryn Manning	United States	Thriller	
Bogieville	Sean Cronin	Arifin Putra, Eloise Lovell Anderson, Sean Cronin, Daniel P. Lewis	United States	Road Horror	
Bramayugam	Rahul Sadasivan	Mammootty, Arjun Ashokan, Siddharth Bharathan	India	Folk Horror	
Camp Pleasant Lake	Thomas Walton	Jonathan Lipnicki, Michael Paré, Bonnie Aarons, Andrew Divoff, Robert LaSardo	United States	Horror Slasher	
Carnage for Christmas	Alice Maio Mackay	Jeremy Moineau	Australia	Christmas horror	
Chuzalongo	Diego Ortuño	Bruno Odar, Wolframio Sinué, Aléx Cisneros, Fernando Bacilio, Mónica Mancero, Toa Tituaña, Yuyak Guitarra, Karla Gómez, Lenin Farinango, Matilde Lagos, Gael Ortuño, Sisa Farez	Ecuador, Canada, Peru, Spain	Folk horror	
Cloud	Kiyoshi Kurosawa	Masaki Suda	Japan	Psychological horror	
Cuckoo	Tilman Singer	Hunter Schafer, Dan Stevens, Jessica Henwick	Germany	Horror	
Cult Killer	Jon Keeyes	Alice Eve, Antonio Banderas, Paul Reid, Shelley Hennig	United States	Horror Thriller	
Daddy's Head	Benjamin Barfoot	Rupert Turnbull, Julia Brown, Charles Aitken	United Kingdom	Horror	
Dancing Village: The Curse Begins	Kimo Stamboel	Aulia Sarah, Maudy Effrosina, Jourdy Pranata	Indonesia	Horror	
DarkGame	Howard J. Ford	Ed Westwick, Andrew P. Stephen, Natalya Tsvetkova, Lola Wayne, Rory Alexander, Rose Reynolds	United States	Horror Thriller	
Dead Mail	Joe DeBoer, Kyle McConaghy	Sterling Macer Jr., John Fleck, Thomas boykin, Susan Priver, Micki Jackson	United States	Crime Horror Mystery	
Dead Sea	Phil Volken	Dean Cameron, Isabel Gravitt, Garrett Wareing, Alexander Wraith, Genneya Walton	United States	Crime Horror Thriller	
Dead Talents Society	John Hsu	Chen Bolin, Sandrine Pinna, Gingle Wang, Eleven Yao, Bai Bai, Soso Tseng	Taiwan	Comedy horror	
Demon Slayer: Kimetsu no Yaiba – To the Hashira Training	Haruo Sotozaki	Natsuki Hanae, Akari Kitō, Yoshitsugu Matsuoka, Hiro Shimono	Japan	Animated Dark fantasy Action	
Destroy All Neighbors	Josh Forbes	Jonah Ray, Randee Heller, Pete Ploszek, Kiran Deol	United States	Splatter Horror Comedy	
Die Alone	Lowell Dean	Carrie-Anne Moss, Douglas Smith, Frank Grillo	Canada	Horror Thriller	
Director's Cut	Don Capria	Louis Lombardi, Lucy Hart, Danielle Kotch, Tyler Ivey, Haley Cassidy	United States	Slasher	
Do Not Enter	Hugo Cardozo	Lucas Caballero, Pablo Martínez	Paraguay	Horror Thriller	
Don't Move	Adam Schindler, Brian Netto	Kelsey Asbille, Finn Wittrock, Moray Treadwell, Daniel Francis	United States	Thriller	
Drained	Sean Cronin, Peter Stylianou	Ruaridh Aldington, Madalina Bellariu Ion, Angela Dixon, Craig Conway, Andrew-Lee Potts, Natasha patel, Andrew Lyle-Pinnock	United Kingdom	Romance Vampire	
Elevation	George Nolfi	Anthony Mackie, Morena Baccarin, Maddie Hasson, Tony Goldwyn	United States	Post-apocalyptic Monster	
Else	Thibault Emin	Matthieu Sampeur, Édith Proust, Lika Minamoto	France, Belgium	Science fiction horror, body horror	
Espantaho	Chito S. Roño	Judy Ann Santos, Lorna Tolentino	Philippines	Supernatural horror	
Exhuma	Jang Jae-hyun	Choi Min-sik, Kim Go-eun, Yoo Hae-jin, Lee Do-hyun	South Korea	Supernatural Mystery Thriller	
Exorcism Chronicles: The Beginning	Kim Dong-chul	Choi Han, Nam Doh-hyeong, Jung Yoo-jung, Kim Yeon-woo	South Korea	Horror Animated	
Festival of the Living Dead	Jen and Sylvia Soska	Ashley Moore, Camren Bicondova	United States	Zombie	
Ganymede	Colby Holt, Sam Probst	Jordan Doww, Pablo Castelblanco, Robyn Lively, Joe Chrest	United States	Horror Thriller	
Grave Torture	Joko Anwar	Faradina Mufti, Reza Rahadian, Christine Hakim, Slamet Rahardjo	Indonesia	Psychological horror	
Handling the Undead	Thea Hvistendahl	Renate Reinsve, Bjørn Sundquist, Bente Børsum, Anders Danielsen Lie, Bahar Pars, Inesa Dauksta	Norway	Horror Mystery	
Haunt Season	Jake Jarvi	Brent Bentley, Craig Benzine, Ana Dragovich, Sarah Elizabeth	United States	Slasher	
Hellboy: The Crooked Man	Brian Taylor	Jack Kesy, Jefferson White, Adeline Rudolph, Joseph Marcell, Leah McNamara	United States	Superhero Horror	
Heretic	Scott Beck and Bryan Woods	Hugh Grant, Chloe East, Sophie Thatcher	United States	Horror Thriller	
History of Evil	Bo Mirhosseni	Paul Wesley, Jackie Cruz, Tordy Clark	United States	Horror Thriller	
Hold Your Breath	Will Joines, Karrie Crouse	Sarah Paulson, Annaleigh Ashford, Ebon Moss-Bachrach, Bill Heck, Amiah Miller	United States	Psychological horror-thriller	
House of Spoils	Bridget Savage Cole, Danielle Krudy	Ariana DeBose, Barbie Ferreira, Arian Moayed	United States	Supernatural horror	
Humane	Caitlin Cronenberg	Jay Baruchel, Emily Hampshire, Sebastian Chacon, Alanna Bale, Sirena Gulamgaus, Uni Park, Enrico Colantoni, Peter Gallagher	Canada	Horror Thriller	
I Don't Understand You	David Joseph Craig, Brian Crano	Nick Kroll, Andrew Rannells, Morgan Spector, Amanda Seyfried	United States, Italy	Horror Comedy	
I Saw the TV Glow	Jane Schoenbrun	Justice Smith, Brigette Lundy-Paine, Danielle Deadwyler, Fred Durst	United States	Horror	
Imaginary	Jeff Wadlow	DeWanda Wise, Betty Buckley	United States	Supernatural horror	
Immaculate	Michael Mohan	Sydney Sweeney, Álvaro Morte, Benedetta Porcaroli, Dora Romano, Giorgio Colangeli, Simona Tabasco	United States	Psychological horror	
In a Violent Nature	Chris Nash	Ry Barrett, Andrea Pavlovic, Cameron Love, Liam Leone, Reece Presley	Canada	Slasher	
It's What's Inside	Greg Jardin	Brittany O'Grady, James Morosini, Alycia Debnam-Carey, Devon Terrell, Gavin Leatherwood, Reina Hardesty, Nina Bloomgarden, David W. Thompson	United States	Comedy horror	
Kuman Thong	Xian Lim	Cindy Miranda, Max Nattapol Diloknawarit, Althea Ruedas	Philippines, Thailand	Horror Drama	
Lampir	Kenny Gulardi	Jolene Marie, Rory Asyari, Gandhi Fernando, Hana Saraswati, Sheila Salsabila, Ge Pamungkas, Ardina Rasti	Indonesia	Supernatural horror	
Last Stop: Rocafort St.	Luis Prieto	Natalia Azahara, Javier Gutiérrez, Valèria Sorolla	Spain	Horror thriller	
Lazareth	Alec Tibaldi	Ashley Judd, Sarah Pidgeon, Katie Douglas, Asher Angel	United States	Mystery Thriller	
Lisa Frankenstein	Zelda Williams	Kathryn Newton, Cole Sprouse, Liza Soberano, Henry Eikenberry, Joe Chrest, Carla Gugino	United States	Horror comedy	
Little Bites	Spider One	Krsy Fox, Jon Sklaroff, Elizabeth Phoenix Caro	United States	Horror	
Longlegs	Oz Perkins	Maika Monroe, Nicolas Cage	United States	Horror Thriller	
Lowlifes	Tesh Guttikonda, Mitch Oliver	Amanda Fix, Matthew MacCaull, Brenna Llewellyn, Elyse Levesque	Canada	Horror	
Lumina	Gino J.H. McKoy	Eric Roberts, Ken Lawson, Emily Hall, Rupert Lazarus, Eleanor Williams, Andrea Tivadar, Sidney Nicole Rogers	United States	Science fiction Horror	
MaXXXine	Ti West	Mia Goth, Elizabeth Debicki, Moses Sumney, Michelle Monaghan, Bobby Cannavale, Lily Collins, Halsey, Giancarlo Esposito, Kevin Bacon	United States	Slasher	
Mickey's Mouse Trap	Jamie Bailey	Simon Phillips, Sophie McIntosh, Nick Biskupek, James Laurin, Mireille Gagné, Damir Kovic	Canada	Independent Comedy Slasher	
Milk & Serial	Curry Barker	Curry Barker, Cooper Tomlinson, Adlih Alvarado, Sterling L. Pope, Jonnathon Cripple, John Simmonds, Gloria Karel	United States	Found footage	
Monster Summer	David Henrie	Mel Gibson, Mason Thames, Abby James Witherspoon, Noah Cottrell	United States	Adventure Horror	
Munjya	Aditya Sarpotdar	Sharvari, Abhay Verma, Mona Singh and Sathyaraj	India	Supernatural comedy horror	
My Zombabe	Bobby Bonifacio Jr.	Empoy Marquez, Kim Molina	Philippines	Romantic comedy Zombie	
Never Let Go	Alexandre Aja	Halle Berry, Percy Daggs IV, Anthony B. Jenkins, Matthew Kevin Anderson, Christin Park, Stephanie Lavigne	United States	Survival horror-thriller	
Nightbitch	Marielle Heller	Amy Adams, Scoot McNairy, Zoë Chao	United States	Comedy horror	
Night Swim	Bryce McGuire	Wyatt Russell, Kerry Condon	United States	Supernatural horror	
No Way Up	Claudio Fäh	Sophie McIntosh, Will Attenborough, Jeremias Amoore, Manuel Pacific, Grace Nettle, Phyllis Logan, Colm Meaney	United Kingdom, United States	Survival Thriller	
Nokturno	Mikhail Red	Nadine Lustre	Philippines	Folk horror	
Nosferatu	Robert Eggers	Bill Skarsgård, Nicholas Hoult, Lily-Rose Depp, Aaron Taylor-Johnson, Emma Corrin, Willem Dafoe, Simon McBurney, Ralph Ineson	United States	Gothic horror	
Oddity	Damian Mc Carthy	Gwilym Lee, Carolyn Bracken, Tadhg Murphy, Caroline Menton, Steve Wall, Jonathan French, Joe Rooney	Ireland	Paranormal Horror	
Once Upon a Time in Amityville	Mark Polonia	Ken Van Sant, Titus Himmelberger, Jeff Kirkendall	United States	Contemporary Western Horror	
Operation Blood Hunt	Louis Mandylor	Quinton Jackson, Louis Mandylor, Jonathan Rhys Meyers, Sonia Couling	United States, Thailand	War Action Horror	
Outbreak	Jeff Wolfe	Billy Burke	United States	Zombie Mystery Thriller	
Outside	Carlo Ladesma	Sid Lucero, Beauty Gonzalez, Marco Masa, Joel Torre	Philippines	Zombie	
Pagpag 24/7	JR Reyes	Jerald Napoles, Nicco Manalo, Danita Paner, Nikko Natividad, Wilbert Ross	Philippines	Comedy horror	
Párvulos: Children of the Apocalypse	Isaac Ezban	Farid Escalante, Mateo Ortega, Leonardo Cervantes, Carla Adell, Norma Flores, Noé Hernández, Omar Karim, Horacio F. Lazo, Efrain Rosas Léono, Tito Onofre Andrade Racenis, Juan Carlos Remolina, Marco Rodríguez, Emilio Galvan, Jason Luis Rodríguez	Mexico	Post-apocalyptic horror	
Pasahero	Roman Perez Jr.	Bea Binene, Louise delos Reyes, Mark Anthony Fernandez, Katya Santos, Yumi Garcia, Andre Yllana, Dani Zee	Philippines	Crime Supernatural Horror	
Presence	Steven Soderbergh	Lucy Liu, Julia Fox, Chris Sullivan	United States	Psychological thriller	
Rambut Kafan	Helfi C.H. Kardit	Yama Carlos, Nita Gunawan, Virnie Ismail, Bulan Sutena, Cathrine Wilson	Indonesia	Horror Drama	
Rich Flu	Galder Gaztelu-Urrutia	Mary Elizabeth Winstead, Rafe Spall, Lorraine Bracco, Jonah Hauer-King, Timothy Spall	Spain	Mystery Thriller	
Rita	Jayro Bustamante	Giuliana Santa Cruz	Guatemala, United States	Dark fantasy Horror	
'Salem's Lot	Gary Dauberman	Lewis Pullman, Makenzie Leigh, Bill Camp, Pilou Asbæk, Alfre Woodard, William Sadler	United States	Supernatural Horror	
Seven Cemeteries	John Gulager	Danny Trejo, Efren Ramirez, Maria Canals-Barrera	United States	Horror Comedy Fantasy	
Shaitaan	Vikas Bahl	Ajay Devgn, R. Madhavan, Jyothika, Anngad Raaj, and Janki Bodiwala	India	Supernatural horror thriller film	
Shelby Oaks	Chris Stuckmann	Camille Sullivan, Brendan Sexton III, Michael Beach, Robin Bartlett, Keith David, Charlie Talbert, Emily Bennett, Sarah Durn	United States	Supernatural horror	
Silence of the Prey	Karyna Kudzina, Michael Vaynberg	Monte Bezell, Michael Doyle, Lorianna Izrailova, Karina Kudzina	United States	Horror	
Sincerely Saul	Ian Tripp	Ryan Schafer, Mickey Faerch, Augie Duke, Karl Backus, Brendan Cahalan, Amber Grayson, Paul Fisher III, Randy Davison, Luis Martinez, Beth Gallagher, T. K. Richardson	United States	Comedy horror	
Skeletons in the Closet	Asif Akbar	Terrence Howard, Cuba Gooding Jr	United States	Horror	
Slay	Jem Garrard	Trinity the Tuck, Heidi N Closet, Crystal Methyd, Cara Melle	Canada	Comedy horror	
Smile 2	Parker Finn	Kyle Gallner, Naomi Scott, Lukas Gage, Rosemarie DeWitt	United States	Supernatural horror	
Solvent	Johannes Grenzfurthner	Jon Gries, Aleksandra Cwen, Roland Gratzer, Johannes Grenzfurthner	Austria	Supernatural horror, Mystery	
Speak No Evil	James Watkins	James McAvoy, Alix West Lefler, Mackenzie Davis, Scoot McNairy	United States	Psychological horror thriller	
Sting	Kiah Roache-Turner	Alyla Browne, Penelope Mitchell, Ryan Corr, Jermaine Fowler	Australia	Horror	
Strange Darling	JT Mollner	Willa Fitzgerald, Kyle Gallner, Ed Begley Jr., Barbara Hershey	United States	Horror Thriller	
Strange Frequencies: Taiwan Killer Hospital	Kerwin Go	Enrique Gil, Jane de Leon	Philippines	Horror Found footage	
Strange Harvest	Stuart Ortiz	Peter Zizzo, Terri Apple, Andy Lauer, Matthew Peschio	United States	Horror Mockumentary	
Stream	Michael Leavy	Jeffrey Combs, Charles Edwin Powell, Tim Reid, David Howard Thornton, Dee Wallace, Danielle Harris, Tony Todd	United States	Slasher	
Stree 2	Amar Kaushik	Rajkummar Rao, Shraddha Kapoor, Pankaj Tripathi, Abhishek Banerjee, Aparshakti Khurana	India	Supernatural comedy horror	
Sunrise	Andrew Baird	Alex Pettyfer, Crystal Yu, William Gao, Kurt Yaeger, Olwen Fouéré, Guy Pearce	United States, United Kingdom	Horror	
Tarot	Spenser Cohen, Anna Halberg	Harriet Slater, Adain Bradley, Avantika Vandanapu, Jacob Batalon	United States	Supernatural Horror	
Tarot	Ashbun	Cho Yeo-jeong, Kim Jin-young, Ko Kyu-pil	South Korea	Horror Thriller Mystery	
Terrifier 3	Damien Leone	David Howard Thornton, Lauren LaVera, Elliott Fullam, Samantha Scaffidi	United States	Slasher	
The American Backyard	Pupi Avati	Filippo Scotti, Rita Tushingham, Armando De Ceccon, Roberto De Francesco, Chiara Caselli, Romano Reggiani, Morena Gentile	Italy	Gothic Horror	
The Buildout	Zeshaan Younus	Jenna Kanell, Hannah Alline, Natasha Halevi	United States	Found footage	
The Crow	Rupert Sanders	Bill Skarsgård, FKA Twigs, Isabella Wei	United States	Supernatural Superhero	
The Cursed Land	Panu Aree, Kong Rithdee	Ananda Everingham, Bront Palarae, Jennis Oprasert, Seeda Puapimon	Thailand	Horror Thriller	
The Damned	Thordur Palsson	Joe Cole, Odessa Young	United Kingdom, Iceland, Ireland, Belgium, United States	Horror	
The Deliverance	Lee Daniels	Andra Day, Rob Morgan, Caleb McLaughlin, Aunjanue Ellis-Taylor, Omar Epps, Tasha Smith, Mo'Nique, Glenn Close	United States	Supernatural horror Thriller	
The Deserving	Koka Singh Arora	Venkat Sai Gunda, Simone Stadler, Kelsey Stalter	United States	Horror	
The Exorcism	M. A. Fortin, Joshua John Miller	Russell Crowe, Ryan Simpkins, Sam Worthington, Chloe Bailey, Adam Goldberg, David Hyde Pierce	United States	Supernatural horror	
The First Omen	Arkasha Stevenson	Nell Tiger Free, Tawfeek Barhom, Sônia Braga, Bill Nighy, Ralph Ineson	United States	Supernatural horror	
The Front Room	The Eggers Brothers	Brandy Norwood, Kathryn Hunter, Andrew Burnap	United States	Psychological horror	
The Gatekeeper	Matthew Rosen, Dean Rosen	Shanaia Gomez	Philippines	Supernatural Mystery Folk Horror	
The Jack in the Box Rises	Lawrence Fowler	Nicholas Anscombe, Isabella Colby Browne, Lisa Antrobus, Anna Blackburn	United Kingdom	Horror	
The Last Breath	Joachim Hedén	Kim Spearman, Jack Parr, Alexander Arnold, Erin Mullen, Arlo Carter	Canada, United Kingdom, Sweden, Belgium, Malta, Finland	Survival, Horror, Thriller	
The Moogai	Jon Bell	Shari Sebbens, Meyne Wyatt, Tessa Rose, Clarence Ryan, Toby Leonard Moore, Bella Heathcote	Australia	Horror	
The Mummy Murders	Colin Bressler	Leila Annastasia Scott, Jason Scarbrough, Jeff Caperton, Will Donahue, Aimee Michelle, Destiny Soria, Cole Springer, Isak Tufic	United States	Horror	
The Night Curse of Reatrei	Leak Lyda; Diep Sela	Norodom Jenna, Paing Takhon, Tharoth Sam, Shin Yubin	Cambodia; Myanmar	Horror Mystery	
The Platform 2	Galder Gaztelu-Urrutia	Hovik Keuchkerian, Milena Smit	Spain	Science fiction Horror	
The Radleys	Euros Lyn	Damian Lewis, Kelly Macdonald, Sophia Di Martino, Shaun Parkes, Harry Baxendale, Bo Bragason	United Kingdom	Comedy horror	
The Ritual Soul	Diep Sela	Soriya Khon, Tong Ly, Seng Phanith, Puthy Rith, Meas Ningning	Cambodia	horror comedy	
The Shrouds	David Cronenberg	Vincent Cassel, Diane Kruger, Guy Pearce	France, Canada	Horror	
The Strangers: Chapter 1	Renny Harlin	Madelaine Petsch, Froy Gutierrez, Gabriel Basso	United States	Slasher	
The Substance	Coralie Fargeat	Demi Moore, Margaret Qualley, Dennis Quaid	France, United States, United Kingdom	Body horror	
The Wailing	Pedro Martín-Calero	Ester Expósito, Mathilde Ollivier, Malena Villa, Sonia Almarcha, Àlex Monner, Tomás del Estal	Spain, France, Argentina	Psychological horror	
The Watchers	Ishana Night Shyamalan	Dakota Fanning, Georgina Campbell	United States	Supernatural horror	
There Is a Monster	Mike Taylor	Joey Collins, Ena O'Rourke, Jesse Milliner	United States	Psychological thriller Horror	
Things Will Be Different	Michael Felker	Adam David Thompson, Riley Dandy	United States	Time Travel Thriller	
Time Cut	Hannah MacPherson	Michael Shanks, Madison Bailey, Antonia Gentry, Griffin Gluck	United States	Science fiction Slasher	
Trap	M. Night Shyamalan	Josh Hartnett, Saleka	United States	Thriller	
Under Paris	Xavier Gens	Bérénice Bejo, Nassim Lyes, Léa Léviant	France	Action Horror Disaster	
V/H/S/Beyond	Jordan Downey; Christian Long; Justin Long; Justin Martinez; Virat Pal; Kate Siegel; Jay Cheel	Various	United States	Science fiction Horror Anthology	
Werewolves	Steven C. Miller	Frank Grillo, Katrina Law, Ilfenesh Hadera, James Michael Cummings, Lou Diamond Phillips	United States	Action Horror	
Winnie-the-Pooh: Blood and Honey 2	Rhys Frake-Waterfield	Scott Chambers, Tallulah Evans, Ryan Oliva, Eddy McKenzie, Lewis Santer, Marcus Massey, Alec Newman, Simon Callow	United Kingdom	Horror Slasher	
Witchboard	Chuck Russell	Jamie Campbell Bower, Madison Iseman, Aaron Dominguez, Antonia Desplat, Charlie Tahan	United States	Supernatural horror	
Y2K	Kyle Mooney	Jaeden Martell, Julian Dennison, Rachel Zegler, Daniel Zolghadri	United States	Disaster Comedy horror	
Your Monster	Caroline Lindy	Melissa Barrera, Tommy Dewey, Edmund Donovan, Kayla Foster	United States	Romantic horror comedy	
Z-Mom	Kou Darachan	Rern Sinat, John Maclaren, Leav Veng Hour	Cambodia	Romance Zombie	
