= Miss Universe Cambodia 2022 =

- Date: June 15, 2022
- Presenters: Sarita Reth; Try Davaruth; Na Sady
- Venue: Bayon TV Steung Meanchey Studio, Phnom Penh, Cambodia
- Broadcaster: Bayon Television
- Entrants: 20
- Placements: 10
- Winner: Manita Hang; Phnom Penh
- Congeniality: Manita Hang; Phnom Penh

Miss Universe Cambodia 2022 was the 4th edition of the Miss Universe Cambodia pageant held on June 15, 2022 in Phnom Penh. Ngin Marady crowned Manita Hang as her successor at the end of the event.

== Background ==
=== Location and date ===
The fourth edition of the Miss Universe Cambodia beauty contest was scheduled to be held on 15 June 2022. The press conference of the contest was conducted at the Oakwood Premier in Phnom Penh on 30 April, in which the Bayon TV Steung Meanchey Studio in Phnom Penh will be served as the venue for the national costume parade, preliminary competition and the grand final coronation whereas R&F City Swimming Pool of R&F City Phnom Penh will be served as the venue for the swimsuit competition.

List of the main events in the Miss Universe Cambodia 2022 pageant
Location	Date	Event	Venue	Ref.
Final venue: Phnom Penh (20 May – 15 June)	20 May	Press Presentation	Oakwood Premier Phnom Penh, Phnom Penh City Center	
Final venue: Phnom Penh (20 May – 15 June)	8 June	National Costume and Preliminary Competition	Bayon TV Steung Meanchey Studio, Phnom Penh	
Final venue: Phnom Penh (20 May – 15 June)	10 June	Maharlika Night	Nagaworld Hotel Ballroom 1, Nagaworld Phnom Penh	
Final venue: Phnom Penh (20 May – 15 June)	12 June	Swimsuit Competition	R&F City Swimming Pool, R&F City Phnom Penh	
Final venue: Phnom Penh (20 May – 15 June)	15 June	Grand Final Coronation	Bayon TV Steung Meanchey Studio, Phnom Penh	

=== Hosts and Performer ===
Like the 2021 edition, Try Davaruth (Cambodia's Man of the Year 2019) hosted the preliminary competition with the reigning Miss Universe Cambodia (Ngin Marady) to host the preliminary competition as well as Somnang Alyna hosting as well. As for the final however, instead of Somnang Alyna, Na sady and Sarita Reth (Miss Universe Cambodia 2020 and official mentor of Miss Universe Cambodia) hosted the event with Try Davaruth.

=== Selection of Participants ===
Applications for Miss Universe Cambodia started on 1st April 2022 and the official press presentation for Miss Universe Cambodia 2022 was on 20th May 2022.

=== 'Queen Indradevi' Crown ===
A new crown will be used to award the winner of the Miss Universe Cambodia pageant for the 2022 edition. The headwear is known as the "Queen Indradevi" crown and was crafted by CSNJ Samnang Jewellery. The crown costs USD $180,000 (KHR 736,394,760 ៛)

The crown was inspired from the headwear of Queen Indradevi, wife of Jayavarman VII. It is said to be designed to follow the greatness of Queen Indradevi’s Crown, which shows power and prestige of Khmer women from the past and the present.

== Results ==
Color keys

- The contestant Won in an International pageant.
- The contestant was a Runner-up in an International pageant.
- The contestant was a Semi-Finalist in an International pageant.
- The contestant assumed another title.
- The contestant was not able to compete in an International pageant.
- The contestant did not place but won a Special Award in the pageant.
- The contestant did not place.

Final results	Contestant	International pageant	International Results
Miss Universe Cambodia 2022 (Winner)	Phnom Penh - Manita Hang	Miss Universe 2022	Unplaced
1st runner-up	Kandal - Nisay Heng		
2nd runner-up	Kratié - Bonika Heng		
3rd runner-up (Miss Eco Cambodia 2022)	Phnom Penh - Ratana Sokhavatey	Miss Eco International 2023	3rd Runner-Up
4th runner-up	Kampot - Geklang Hun		
Top 10
Top 10	Kampong Chhnang – Sreypich Sary	Miss Petite Global 2022	Winner
Top 10	Phnom Penh – Sreykhouch Houn	KBJ Ratu Kebaya International 2022	Top 8
Top 10	Canada – Reasey Samoeun Angkea		
Top 10	Phnom Penh – Sokundavy Uch		
Top 10	Phnom Penh – Soriyan Hang		

== Contestants ==
20 contestants competed for the title.

No.	Contestants	Age	Hometown	Placement
1	Reasey Samoeun Angkea	27	Canada	Top 10
2	Kaknika Heng	20	Tboung Khmum	
3	Soriyan Hang	28	Phnom Penh	Top 10
4	Bonika Heng	24	Kratié	2nd Runner-Up
5	Valiza Phay	18	Kampong Cham	
6	Sreykhouch Houn	27	Phnom Penh	Top 10
7	Chakriya Sokun	22	Kampong Cham	
8	Sokhavatey Ratana	20	Phnom Penh	3rd Runner-Up
9	Nisay Heng	25	Kandal	1st Runner-Up
10	Munyratha Loeung	19	Kratié	
11	Sreylis Kong	23	Kampong Cham	
12	Marineth Morm	18	Phnom Penh	
13	Chenda Dorm	24	Phnom Penh	
14	Sodalin Sieb	21	Kampot	
15	Sreyleak Pok	22	Kandal	
16	Sokundavy Uch	22	Phnom Penh	Top 10
17	Geklang Hun	21	Kampot	4th Runner-Up
18	Manita Hang	23	Phnom Penh	Miss Universe Cambodia 2022
19	Sreypich Sary	21	Kampong Chhnang	Top 10
20	Panha Chhoy	25	Phnom Penh	

== Crossovers and returnees ==
Contestants who previously competed or will be competing at other beauty pageants:

=== National Pageants ===
Miss Cambodia

- 2021: Sreykhouch Houn (2nd Runner-Up)

Miss Grand Cambodia

- 2020: Sokundavy Uch (as Siem Reap) (Unplaced) (Miss Popular Vote)
- 2021: Sreyleak Pok (as Prey Veng) (Top 10)

Miss Tourism Cambodia

- 2015: Manita Hang (Winner)

Miss Universe Cambodia

- 2019: Panha Chhoy (Top 10)
- 2021: Geklang Hun (Unplaced)
- 2021: Sreyleak Pok (Top 10)
- 2021: Sreypich Sary (Top 10)

Miss World Cambodia

- 2020: Sreyleak Pok (Unplaced)

Miss University Cambodia

- 2016: Sothnisay Heng (1st Runner-up)

=== International Pageants ===
Miss Earth

- 2020: Nisay Heng (appointed) (Unplaced) (Winner - Talent (Sing Category) Asia / Oceania)

Miss Chinese World

- 2021: Panha Chhoy (appointed) (Unplaced)

Miss Global

- 2019: Soriyan Hang (appointed) (Top 11)

Miss Tourism Metropolitan

- 2016: Manita Hang (2nd Runner-Up)

Miss World Peace

- 2022: Geklang Hun (TBA)

Miss Cosmopolitan World

- 2016: Sothnisay Heng (Unplaced)
