= Rian Fernandez =

Filipino fashion designer

Rian Fernandez is a Filipino couture designer known for creating evening gowns worn in major international beauty pageants, including Miss Universe, Miss World, Miss Grand International, and other global and national competitions. He received wider recognition after designing the evening gown worn by Miss Universe 2022 winner R'Bonney Gabriel and has since been commissioned by contestants from several countries. Fashion publications have described his work as culturally influenced and reflective of Filipino craftsmanship.

== Early life and education ==
Fernandez is originally from Alcala, Pangasinan. He was born to Eduardo Monegas Fernandez and Marina Collado-Fernandez. He completed his Communication Arts degree from Saint Louis University in Baguio City, where his involvement in the university’s theater group sparked his interest in costume design. He pursued advanced fashion training at LaSalle College of the Arts in Singapore, where he took fashion and later became a member of the ASEAN Fashion Designers Council.

== Career ==
=== Career beginnings and establishment of atelier ===
In 2012, Fernandez founded Rian Fernandez Atelier, a couture label based in Pangasinan that serves clients in the Philippines and abroad. His designs often incorporate beadwork, structured silhouettes, and cultural motifs, according to fashion media reports.

=== Rise in pageant couture ===
Fernandez first gained attention through his work in Philippine national pageants before expanding internationally. Delegates from the United States, Thailand, Cambodia, and other countries have worn his creations in various competitions.

He gained wider international visibility when Miss Universe 2022 winner R’Bonney Gabriel wore a black velvet gown he designed for the competition. Gabriel noted that Fernandez had been responsible for creating all of her gowns following her Miss USA 2022 victory.

=== Notable designs for international pageants ===
==== Miss Universe ====
Fernandez has designed gowns for several Miss Universe candidates, including:

- R’Bonney Gabriel (Miss Universe 2022 winner): a black velvet gown with mirror accents, fringe details, and blue Swarovski stones.
- Opal Suchata (Miss Universe Thailand 2024 winner): an off-shoulder trumpet gown with hand-embroidered crystals and a ribbon motif linked to Suchata’s advocacy.

He also designed gowns for several pageant titleholders, including Miss Cambodia 2025 Sarita Reth, Miss Cambodia 2019 Somnang Alyna, Miss Universe Cambodia 2018 Rern Sinat, and Miss Thailand 2016 Chalita Suansane.

==== Miss Grand International ====
Fernandez created the gown worn by Emma Tiglao at Miss Grand International 2025, which he described as phoenix-inspired.

==== Miss World ====
He designed a white and silver gown for Krishnah Gravidez at Miss World 2025, which he stated incorporated Filipino motifs and elements inspired by the Philippine flag.

==== Other competitions ====
At Miss Supranational 2025, 3rd Runner-Up Tarah Valencia wore a blue-and-pink cape gown inspired by the Philippines’ waves and reefs. Miss Eco International 2025 winner Alexie Brooks wore a solihiya-inspired gown embellished with crystal.

=== Other notable gowns ===
Fernandez created a white column gown worn by Shuvee Etrata at the GMA Gala 2025. Roxie Smith wore one of his bridal designs at the “Inspired Beginnings” bridal exhibition at Conrad Manila.

=== Runway and international appearances ===
In 2022, Fernandez presented a couture collection at Arab Fashion Week, marking his Middle East runway debut.

In 2024, Fernandez was featured in The Grid Show, which was presented as part of Fashion Week Houston.

He served on the selection committee for Miss Universe India 2024 in Jaipur.

He also showcased his designs at the hiTech MODA runway event during New York Fashion Week.

== Awards and recognition ==
In 2023, the Pangasinan provincial government recognized Fernandez for designing the Miss Universe 2022 winning gown and acknowledged his contribution to promoting Filipino talent internationally.

In 2024, Fernandez was nominated for Best of the Year Pageantry Designer at MEGA Fashion Awards.

== Personal influences and social contributions ==
In an interview with CW39 anchor Sharron Melton during Fashion Week Houston, Fernandez explained that his early interest in art influenced his design approach. He also noted his involvement with the Philippine-based Kalakal Charity.
