= Sotima John =

Cambodian model and beauty pageant titleholder (born 2000)

- Born: Sotima John; March 29, 2000 (age 26); Kampong Cham; Cambodia
- Occupation: Model
- Height: 1.78 m (5 ft 10 in)
- Beauty pageant titleholder
- Title: Miss Universe Cambodia 2023; Miss Tourism Cambodia 2019; Dream Girl of the Year International 2019
- Hair color: Black
- Eye color: Brown
- Major competitions: Miss Grand Cambodia2017 (2nd runner-up); Miss Universe Cambodia 2019 (2nd runner-up); Miss Tourism International 2019 (4th runner-up); Miss Universe Cambodia 2023 (Winner); Miss Universe 2023 (Unplaced)

Sotima John (Khmer: ចន សុទីម៉ា, born 29 March 2000) is a Cambodian model and beauty queen. She was crowned Miss Universe Cambodia 2023 and represented Cambodia at the Miss Universe 2023 pageant in San Salvador, El Salvador.

== Pageantry ==
=== Miss Grand Cambodia 2017 ===
On 17 August 2017, Sotima started her beauty pageant career and competed in Miss Grand Cambodia 2017 at the Nagaworld Hotel Grand Ballroom in Phnom Penh. She placed as 2nd runner-up and lost to eventual winner Khloem Sreykea.

=== Miss Universe Cambodia 2019 ===
On 31 March 2019, Sotima represented Tboung Khmum at Miss Universe Cambodia 2019 and competed with 25 other candidates at the Nagaworld – NABA Theater in Phnom Penh. She placed 2nd runner-up and lost to eventual winner Somnang Alyna and was crowned Miss Tourism Cambodia 2019.

=== Miss Tourism International 2019 ===
On 8 November 2019, Sotima represented Cambodia at Miss Tourism International 2019 and competed with 39 other candidates at the Sunway Resort Hotel and Spa in Bandar Sunway, Selangor, Malaysia. She placed as 4th runner-up and lost to eventual winner Cyrille Payumo and was named the 2019 International Dreamgirl of the Year.

=== Miss Universe Cambodia 2023 ===
On 7 September 2023, Sotima represented Kampong Cham joined Miss Universe Cambodia 2023 and competed with 35 other candidates at Bayon TV Steung Meanchey Studio in Phnom Penh.

At the end of the event, she managed to win the title and was crowned by Sotheary Bee.

=== Miss Universe 2023 ===
On November 18, 2023, Sotima represented Cambodia at Miss Universe 2023 in San Salvador, El Salvador.

Awards and achievements
Preceded by Manita Hang	Miss Universe Cambodia; 2023	Succeeded by Davin Prasath
