= Miss Universe Cambodia 2019 =

- Date: March 31, 2019
- Venue: Nagaworld - NABA Theatre, Phnom Penh, Cambodia
- Broadcaster: CTN
- Entrants: 25
- Placements: 10
- Winner: Somnang Alyna; Phnom Penh
- Congeniality: Kachnak Thyda Bon; Phnom Penh
- Special award: (Miss Popular) Choy Panha; Phnom Penh

Miss Universe Cambodia 2019 was the 1st edition of the Miss Universe Cambodia pageant which was held on March 31, 2019, at the Nagaworld - NABA Theatre in Phnom Penh. Miss Universe Cambodia 2018 Rern Sinat crowned Somnang Alyna as her successor at the end of the event.

Miss Universe Cambodia 2019 competition awarded three titles to Cambodian representatives to three major international pageants. Miss Universe Cambodia 2018 Rern Sinat crowned Somnang Alyna as Somnang will compete and represent Cambodia at the Miss Universe 2019 competition; Miss International Cambodia 2017 Nheat Sophea crowned Kachnak Thyda Bon as Kachnak will represent Cambodia at the Miss International 2019 competition while Miss Earth Cambodia 2018 Keo Senglyhour crowned Thoung Mala as Thuong will compete and represent Cambodia at the Miss Earth 2019 competition. The pageant also crowned two Cambodian representatives to other international beauty pageants. Miss Asia Pacific Cambodian 2018 Annchhany Kha crowned Po Kimtheng Sothida as Kimtheng will compete and represent Cambodia at the Miss Asia Pacific International 2019 competition while Miss Tourism Cambodia 2017 Kem Sreyke crowned John Sotima as John will compete and represent Cambodia at Miss Tourism International 2019, respectively.

== Results ==
Color keys

- The contestant Won in an International pageant.
- The contestant was a Runner-up in an International pageant.
- The contestant was a Semi-Finalist in an International pageant.
- The contestant assumed another title.
- The contestant was not able to compete in an International pageant.
- The contestant did not place but won a Special Award in the pageant.
- The contestant did not place.

Final results	Contestant	International pageant	International Results
Miss Universe Cambodia 2019 (Winner)	Phnom Penh - Somnang Alyna	Miss Universe 2019	Unplaced
Miss Universe Cambodia 2019 (Winner)	Phnom Penh - Somnang Alyna	Miss International 2023	Unplaced
1st runner-up (Miss Earth Cambodia 2019)	Kandal - Thoung Mala	Miss Earth 2019	Unplaced
2nd runner-up (Miss Tourism Cambodia 2019)	Tboung Khmum - John Sotima	Miss Tourism International 2019/20	4th Runner-up (Dream girl of the year International 2019/20)
3rd runner-up (Miss Asia Pacific Cambodia 2019)	Phnom Penh - Pokimtheng Sothida	Miss Asia Pacific International 2019	Unplaced
3rd runner-up (Miss Asia Pacific Cambodia 2019)	Phnom Penh - Pokimtheng Sothida	Miss Tourism Metropolitan International 2019	Top 10
4th runner-up (Miss International Cambodia 2019)	Phnom Penh - Kachnak Thyda Bon	Miss International 2019	Unplaced
Top 10	Phnom Penh – Kong Socheata (Miss Asia Awards Cambodia 2019)	Miss Asia Awards 2019	Unplaced
Top 10	Phnom Penh – Suy Bunavin (Miss Cosmos World Cambodia 2019)	Miss Cosmos World 2019	Unplaced
Top 10	Banteay Meanchey – Roeun Youry		
Top 10	Phnom Penh – Nin Malyneth		
Top 10	Phnom Penh – Chhoy Panha		

== Contestant ==
No.	Contestants	Age	Hometown	Placement
1	Prek Siguek	22	Kampong Cham	
2	Khon Srey Nich	18	Phnom Penh	
3	Chhoy Panha	22	Phnom Penh	Top 10 (Popular Vote)
4	Hom Srey Khouch	19	Kandal	
5	Suy Bonavin	24	Phnom Penh	Top 10 (Miss Cosmos World Cambodia 2019)
6	Chun Sok Linda	19	Sihanoukville	
7	Tham Malina	18	Phnom Penh	
8	Somnang Alyna	18	Phnom Penh	Miss Universe Cambodia 2019
9	Chan Sokny	22	Pursat	
10	In Leakena	17	Phnom Penh	
11	Att Nika	22	Takéo	
12	Po Kimtheng Sothida	22	Phnom Penh	3rd runner-up (Miss Asia Pacific Cambodia 2019)
13	Roeun Youry	19	Banteay Meanchey	Top 10
14	John Sotima	20	Tboung Khmum	2nd runner-up (Miss Tourism Cambodia 2019)
15	Kong Socheata	18	Phnom Penh	Top 10 (Miss Asia Awards Cambodia 2019)
16	Nin Malyneth	25	Phnom Penh	Top 10
17	Thoung Mala	19	Kandal	1st runner-up (Miss Earth Cambodia 2019)
18	Oem Veasna	19	Phnom Penh	
19	U Lii Mey	19	Phnom Penh	
20	Ten Sokheng	20	Kampong Thom	
21	Kachnak Thyda Bon	24	Phnom Penh	4th runner-up (Miss International Cambodia 2019)
22	Sal Chandalin	22	Tboung Khmum	
23	Lim Danin	23	Kampong Cham	
24	Sok Chan Pich	19	Kampong Speu	
25	Pich Srey Net	22	Svay Rieng	

== Crossovers and returnees ==
Contestants who previously competed or will be competing at other beauty pageants:

=== National Pageants ===
Miss Cambodia

- 2017: Thoung Mala(Top10)

Miss World Cambodia

- 2019:In Leakena (1st Runner-Up)

Miss Grand Cambodia

- 2017: John Sotima (2nd Runner up)
- 2017: Roeun Youry (Top 10)
- 2017: Po Kimtheng Sothida (Top 10)

World Miss University Cambodia

- 2017: Somnang Alyna (1st Runner-Up)

=== International Pageants ===
Miss Universe

- 2019:Somnang Alyna (Unplaced)

Miss International

- 2019: Kachnak Thyda Bon (Unplaced)

Miss Earth

- 2019: Thoung Mala (Unplaced)

Miss Asia Pacific International

- 2019: Po Kimtheng Sothida (Unplaced)

World Miss University

- 2017: Somnang Alyna (Top 16)

Miss City Tourism world

- 2017: Po kimtheng Sothida (3rd Runner-Up)

Miss Tourism International

- 2019: John Sotima (4th Runner-Up)

Miss Tourism Metropolitan

- 2019: Po Kimtheng Sothida(Top 10)

Miss Asia Awards

- 2019: Kong Socheata (Unplaced)

Miss Cosmos World

- 2019: Suy Bonavin (Unplaced)

Miss Dream girl of the year International

- 2019: John Sotima (Winner)
