= Davin Prasath =

Cambodian model and beauty pageant titleholder (born 1991)

- Born: Davin Prasath; May 29, 1991 (age 35); Phnom Penh, Cambodia
- Occupations: model; actress; philanthropist
- Children: 1
- Beauty pageant titleholder
- Title: Universal Women Cambodia 2023; Miss Universe Cambodia 2024
- Years active: 2016
- Hair color: Black
- Eye color: Brown
- Major competition: Freshie Girls and Boys Season 4 (2nd Runner-up) Universal Woman 2023 (4th Runner-Up) Miss Universe Cambodia 2024 (Winner) Miss Universe 2024 (Top 30)

Davin Prasath (Khmer: ប្រាសាទ ដាវីន; born 29 May 1991) is a Cambodian actress, model, philanthropist and beauty pageant titleholder who was crowned Miss Universe Cambodia 2024 on August 29, 2024 in Phnom Penh. She is notably the first married woman and mother to win the national title, marking a significant milestone in the history of Cambodian Pageantry. Her victory allowed her to represent Cambodia at the 73rd Miss Universe Pageant, which took place on November 16, 2024, in Mexico City, Mexico.

== Early life ==
Davin Prasath was born in Phnom Penh, Cambodia, In 2016, she worked as a model in Sydney, Australia.

== Pageantry ==
=== Universal Woman 2023 ===
She represented Cambodia at Universal Woman 2023 in Dubai, where she placed 4th runner-up.

=== Miss Universe Cambodia 2024 ===
On August 29, 2024, she was crowned Miss Universe Cambodia 2024 at the Camwood CTN Studio in Phnom Penh.

=== Miss Universe 2024 ===
Prasath represented Cambodia at the 73rd Miss Universe pageant in Mexico City on November 16, 2024, competing alongside contestants from 125 countries. She finished as a top 30 finalist, becoming the first representative from Cambodia to place at Miss Universe.

Awards and achievements
Preceded by Sotima John	Miss Universe Cambodia; 2024	Succeeded by Nearysocheata Thai
Preceded by None	4th Runner-up Universal Woman; 2023	Succeeded by (Dominican Republic) Chabeli María Peña
