= Miss Universe Cambodia 2024 =

8th edition of the Miss Universe Cambodia competition

- Date: August 29, 2024
- Presenters: Leav Veng Hour; Maria Gigante
- Venue: Camwood CTN Studio, Phnom Penh, Cambodia
- Broadcaster: CTN; Youtube
- Owner: Yiv Chhoy Chhuong
- Entrants: 5
- Placements: 5
- Winner: Davin Prasath; Phnom Penh

Miss Universe Cambodia 2024 was the 8th edition of the Miss Universe Cambodia pageant, held at the Camwood CTN in Phnom Penh, Cambodia, on August 29, 2024.

Sotima John of Kampong Cham crowned Davin Prasath of Phnom Penh as her successor at the end of the event. Davin represented Cambodia at the Miss Universe 2024 pageant held in Mexico, where she placed in the top thirty, making her the first Cambodian woman to be placed in the semis of Miss Universe history. She is noted as the first-ever married Cambodian woman and mother to have been selected to represent the country in Miss Universe.

== Background ==
=== Location and date ===
On April 2, 2024, the Miss Universe Cambodia organization announced that the coronation night will be held on August 29 at the Camwood CTN studio in Phnom Penh, Cambodia.

=== Selection of participants ===
On May 29, 2024, Miss Universe announced Mr.Chhoy as the new National Director of Miss Universe Cambodia. This marks his first time overseeing and organizing the pageant. Subsequently, on June 8, 2024, Miss Universe Cambodia announced the top five contestants. The event also featured face-to-face interviews, where the winners were selected to represent Cambodia in the upcoming international competition.

== Results ==
=== Placements ===
Placement	Contestant
Miss Universe Cambodia 2024	Davin Prasath
Top 5	Soriyan Hang; Mealyann Saing; Sreynet Chhon; Khemma Métayer

== Contestants ==
There are only 5 candidates.

No.	Contestant	Age	Hometown
MUC 01	Mealyann Saing	28	Siem Reab
MUC 02	Sreynet Chhon	28	Phnom Penh
MUC 03	Davin Prasath	33	Phnom Penh
MUC 04	Soriyan Hang	30	Phnom Penh
MUC 05	Khemma Métayer	25	France
