= The Deserving =

2024 film directed by Koka Singh Arora

- Theatrical release poster
- Directed by: Koka Singh Arora
- Written by: Koka Singh Arora
- Produced by: Venkat Sai Gunda; Thirumalesh Gundrath; Vismay Kumar Kothopally
- Starring: Venkat Sai Gunda; Simone Stadler; Kelsey Stalter
- Cinematography: Koshi Kiyokawa
- Edited by: Koka Singh Arora
- Music by: Nga Weng Chio
- Production company: Katha
- Distributed by: The Horror Collective
- Release date: October 1, 2024
- Running time: 76 minutes
- Country: United States
- Language: English

The Deserving is a 2024 horror film directed by Koka Singh Arora. It was released by The Horror Collective on October 1, 2024.

== Premise ==
After being tormented by the hauntings of his victims, Karter, a serial killer and professional photographer decides to kill himself, but his plan is interrupted by a new client.

== Cast ==
- Venkat Sai Gunda - Karter
- Simone Stadler - Lucy Hill
- Kelsey Stalter - Lucy II
- Josselyn Wolf - Young Lucy

== Reception ==
In his review for Film Threat, Terry Sherwood rated it an 8/10 saying that "what is interesting about The Deserving is the style of storytelling that Arora uses throughout." On The Guardian, Catherine Bray rated it 2 out of 5 stars calling it "frustrating story that doesn’t have the storytelling heft its premise deserves."

== See also ==
- List of horror films of 2024
