= Nearysocheata Thai =

Cambodian entrepreneur and beauty pageant titleholder (born 1995)

- (Khmer: ថៃ នារីសុជាតា)
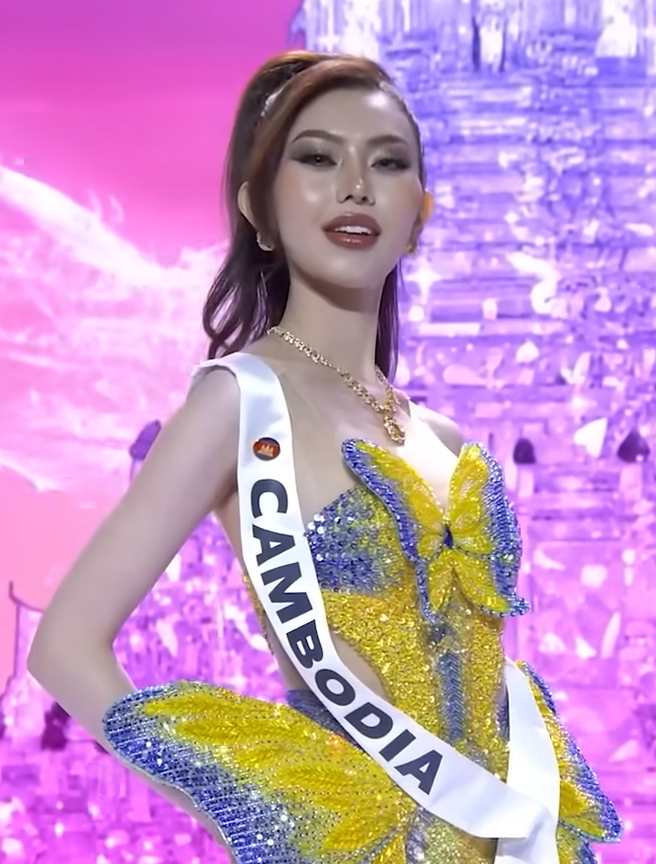
- Nearysocheata at Miss Universe 2025
- Born: Nearysocheata Thai; June 17, 1995 (age 31); Phnom Penh, Cambodia
- Other names: Fiyata; Fiyata Nearysocheata
- Beauty pageant titleholder
- Title: Miss Universe Cambodia 2025
- Hair color: Shiny brown
- Eye color: Dark
- Major competitions: Miss Universe Cambodia 2025; (Winner); Miss Universe 2025; (Unplaced)

Thai Nearysocheata (Khmer: ថៃ នារីសុជាតា; born 17 June 1995) is a Cambodian model, singer, actress, and entrepreneur. She is also a beauty pageant titleholder who was crowned Miss Universe Cambodia 2025 on September 12, 2025. She subsequently represented Cambodia at the 74th Miss Universe pageant in Nonthaburi, Thailand, at the age of 30.

== Pageantry ==
=== Freshei Girl 2010 ===
Nearysocheata Thai began her journey in the public eye through local beauty and modeling competitions. In 2010, under her given name, she competed in the Freshei Girl pageant, where she was awarded the title of Runner-up (2nd place). This early experience launched her career, which later expanded into modeling, singing, and acting before she returned to the pageant stage years later.

=== Miss Universe Cambodia 2025 ===
On September 12, 2025, Nearysocheata Thai was officially crowned Miss Universe Cambodia 2025 in a ceremony held in Phnom Penh, Cambodia. The coronation took place at the National Olympic Stadium.

=== Miss Universe 2025 ===
After winning the Miss Universe Cambodia 2025 title on September 12, 2025, Nearysocheata Thai went on to represent Cambodia at the 74th Miss Universe Pageant in Nonthaburi, Thailand. Her participation in the international competition, which concluded with the final show on November 21, 2025, became a focus of media attention. This was primarily due to her independent decision to compete after her national license holder announced Cambodia's withdrawal from the event. Throughout the preliminary rounds, she was also noted for her resilience, particularly for wearing a custom gown that weighed 10 kilograms.

Awards and achievements
Preceded by Davin Prasath	Miss Universe Cambodia; 2025	Succeeded by Than Rthna
