= Manita Hang =

French-Cambodian beauty pageant titleholder

- ហង្ស ម៉ានីតា
- Beauty pageant titleholder
- Title: Miss Tourism Cambodia 2015; Miss Tourism Metropolitan Cambodia 2016; Miss Universe Cambodia 2022
- Major competitions: Miss Tourism Cambodia 2015 (Winner); Miss Tourism Metropolitan 2016 (2nd runner up); Miss Universe Cambodia 2022 (Winner); Miss Universe 2022 (Unplaced)

Manita Hang (Khmer: ហង្ស ម៉ានីតា) is a French-Cambodian beauty pageant titleholder who won Miss Universe Cambodia 2022. She represented Cambodia at Miss Universe 2022 and was unplaced.

== Pageantry ==
=== Miss Tourism Cambodia 2015 ===
Manita began her beauty pageant career in 2015, when she won Miss Tourism Cambodia 2015.

=== Miss Tourism Metropolitan International 2016 ===
On November 18, 2016, Manita represented Cambodia at Miss Tourism Metropolitan 2016 at the Nagaworld Hotel in Phnom Penh and placed 3rd runner up to Amanda Obdam, who represented Thailand and entered the Top 10 at Miss Universe 2020.

=== Miss Universe Cambodia 2022 ===
On June 15, 2022, Manita won Miss Universe Cambodia 2022. Her previous breakthrough came in 2022 when she won Miss Cambodia.

=== Miss Universe 2022 ===
Manita represented Cambodia at Miss Universe 2022.

=== Miss World 2025 (Withdrew) ===
Manita was to represent Cambodia at Miss World 2025 but withdrew for personal reasons. Five days later, the Miss World Cambodia organization selected Julia Russell as the new representative through a casting process.

Awards and achievements
Preceded by Marady Ngin	Miss Universe Cambodia; 2022	Succeeded by Sotima John
