= Ngin Marady =

Cambodian beauty pageant titleholder

Marady Ngin
- Born: Phnom Penh, Cambodia
- Occupations: model; actress
- Beauty pageant titleholder
- Title: Miss Universe Cambodia 2021
- Major competitions: Miss Universe Cambodia 2021 (Winner); Miss Universe 2021 (Unplaced)

Ngin Marady (Khmer: ងិន ម៉ារ៉ាឌី), also known as Ngin Rosa (Khmer: ងិន រ៉ូសា), is a Cambodian model, actress and beauty pageant titleholder who won Miss Universe Cambodia 2021. She represented Cambodia at Miss Universe 2021 in Eilat, Israel.

== Early life ==
She works as a model and professional actress, and campaigns against discrimination against the LGBTQ community. In 2016, Ngin began working for Revlon Cambodia.

Ngin has previously participated in Miss Cat of the City 2016 and won the 'Best in Catwalk' award.

== Pageantry ==
=== Miss Universe Cambodia 2021 ===
On October 28, 2021, Ngin won against 19 other candidates at Miss Universe Cambodia 2021 in Phnom Penh, and also won the special awards of, Best in Swimsuit and Best in Interview. She was by the previous titleholder Sarita Reth.

=== Miss Universe 2021 ===
As Miss Universe Cambodia 2021, Marady represented Cambodia at Miss Universe 2021 in Eilat, Israel, where she failed to place in the semifinals. During the national costume competition, she unintentionally garnered the attention of the media when the back part of her intricate costume broke off and fell to the ground, requiring the organizers to assist her and intervene for nearly 5 minutes during the live broadcast.

Awards and achievements
Preceded by Sarita Reth	Miss Universe Cambodia; 2021	Succeeded by Manita Hang
