= John Schwab =

American actor, producer and musician

- Education: Durham University
- Occupations: Actor; producer; musician
- Years active: 1997–present
- Spouse: Tamsin Schwab (m. 1994)
- Children: 2

John Schwab is an American actor, TV producer and musician who resides in London. He produced The Hide with Christopher Granier-Deferre, which was nominated for a BIFA 2010. He is best known for his film and television roles, such as lawyer Travis Tygart in the 2015 drama film The Program (2015), baseball player Lefty Grove in the 2018 biographical drama film The Catcher Was a Spy (2018) and television producer Jotham Starr in the television miniseries Dark Money (2019).

He has worked on British television series such as Doctor Who, Clone, My Dad's the Prime Minister, Hotel Babylon and The Mallorca Files. His voice work in animation and video games include Dane in Crysis: Warhead, Zeck in Boo, Zino & the Snurks, Vinnie in Thomas & Friends: The Great Race, Timo in Gladiators of Rome, Jin in Xenoblade Chronicles 2 and Xenoblade Chronicles 2: Torna - The Golden Country, Dandelion in The Witcher video games, Tony Stark / Iron Man in Lego Marvel Super Heroes 2 and the Guardian, Black Sinja and the Blue Sinja in Trials of the Blood Dragon.

== Career ==
Schwab made his first appearance in 1997 as the US voice of a voice trumpet in the British iconic children's series Teletubbies. In 2005, he played Owen Bywater, a commander of the base who guards the Metaltron Cage with his subordinate, De Maggio (Jana Carpenter), in the episode of Doctor Who, "Dalek". His other television roles include Rescue Heroes, My Dad's the Prime Minister, Noel's House Party, Hotel Babylon, Trust, Ultimate Force, Undercover, America's War on Drugs, and Monarch of the Glen.

Schwab served as the narrator of the Discovery Channel documentary television series Weaponology from 2007 through 2008. Schwab provides the voice of Tristan Jackson in the Canadian animated series Elemental Dragons with fellow voice actors Samuel Vincent, Clancy Brown, Andrew Francis, Chiara Zanni, Keith David and Daniel Bacon.

In 2013, Schwab auditioned to provide the US narration for Thomas & Friends after Michael Brandon left the series, but Mark Moraghan was chosen to narrate the show instead in both the US and UK dubs, replacing both Brandon and Michael Angelis. Three years later, he joined the voice cast in the series taking on the role of Stanley in the US dub, replacing Rob Rackstraw and from Season 20 onwards. The same year, he voiced Vinnie, a tough confederation locomotive in the series' 2016 special Thomas & Friends: The Great Race. Following the success of The Great Race, Schwab voiced some characters in the 2017 special Thomas & Friends: Journey Beyond Sodor.

He played an umpire in the comedy film Mr. 3000 (2004), featuring the comedic actor Bernie Mac. His film credits include Back to Gaya, The Fifth Estate, Zero Dark Thirty, The Anomaly, The Current War, The Program, Jurassic World: Fallen Kingdom and Annihilation. He provides voices in video games, such as Kinect Disneyland Adventures, Battlefield 1, Killzone 2 and many others. In 2011, Schwab provided the voice of Dandelion, starting with the video game The Witcher 2: Assassins of Kings. Schwab appears as baseball player Lefty Grove in the biographical film The Catcher Was a Spy (2018), featuring Paul Rudd, Jeff Daniels, Tom Wilkinson and Paul Giamatti. He provided the English voice of Timo in the animated film Gladiators of Rome.

In 2019, he appeared as Jotham Starr, a filmmaker who molested Isaac (Max Fincham) in the BBC One television miniseries Dark Mon£y. In 2024, Schwab appeared as Sheriff Bilstein in the psychological-thriller feature film Blood Star, directed by Lawrence Jacomelli and produced by Beast Films, which premiered at the 2024 Neuchâtel International Fantastic Film Festival and was released in the United States on November 25, 2025, through Quiver Distribution.

=== Music ===
Schwab played the harmonica in the TV show The Hit Factory: The Pete Waterman Story (2001).

=== Producing ===
Schwab, alongside Christopher Granier-Deferre, produced the film The Hide, which was nominated for the British Independent Film Award for producing in 2010.

== Personal life ==
He met his wife, Tamsin, in Seoul after graduation and studied at Durham University (English Literature, 1993–96). He and Tamsin married in 1994 and settled in the United Kingdom. He has two sons.

== Filmography ==
=== Film ===
Year	Title	Role	Notes
2001	Nothing to Declare	Pilot	Voice
2002	Spartans	Alcheus	Voice, direct-to-video
2003	The Order	American Bureaucrat	
2003	Brother Bear	Additional voices	
2004	Boo, Zino & the Snurks	Zeck	Voice
2004	Mr. 3000	Umpire	
2005	Foster	Older Zach	Also associate producer
2005	Nausicaa of the Valley of the Wind	Tolmekian Soldier	Voice, English dub
2007	Davros Connections	Owen Bywater	Direct-to-video; Archival footage Documentary film
2010	Shooting Earth	Moe	Short film
2012	Gladiators of Rome	Timo	Voice, English version
2012	Zero Dark Thirty	Deputy National Security Advisor	
2013	The Fifth Estate	White House Staffer	
2013	Kick-Ass 2	Detective	
2013	The Trap	Dog Cop	
2014	Jack Ryan: Shadow Recruit	New York DWP Worker	
2014	The Angola Deception	Advisor	Short film
2014	Beyond	National Space Agency Spokesperson	
2014	The Anomaly	Harrison Samuel	
2015	The Program	Travis Tygart	
2016	Thomas & Friends: The Great Race	Vinnie	Voice
2016	Soldier	Voiceover	Short film
2016	Storks	Additional voices	
2017	Scooby-Doo! Shaggy's Showdown	Dapper Jack Rogers	Voice
2017	Transformers: The Last Knight	Knight of Iacon	Voice
2017	The Current War	Rudolph Young	
2017	Thomas & Friends: Journey Beyond Sodor	Ulli and an unnamed Bridlington Diesel	Voice
2018	Annihilation	Paramedic	
2018	The Catcher Was a Spy	Lefty Grove	
2018	Jurassic World: Fallen Kingdom	Tech Operator	
2019	Toy Story 4	Additional voices	
2019	The Angry Birds Movie 2	Motorbike Bird	Voice
2024	Blood Star	Sheriff Bilstein	
2026	Crime 101	Foster	Credited as Jacob Schwab

=== Television ===
Year	Title	Role	Notes
1997–2001	Teletubbies	Male Voice Trumpet	365 episodes USA version
1998–present	The Magical World of Walt Disney	Tom	450 episodes
1998	Noel's House Party		Episode: #7.18
2000–2002	Rescue Heroes	Additional Voices	14 episodes
2001	Hotel!	Agent Imefine	
2003	My Dad's the Prime Minister	American Businessman	Episode: "Homework"
2004–2010	Wife Swap	Narrator	107 episodes
2004	Space Odyssey	Larry Conrad, CAPCOM	Television film; documentary
2005	Hope & Faith	Announcer	Episodes: "Wife Swap"
2005	Doctor Who	Owen Bywater	Episode: "Dalek"
2005–2006	Transformers: Cybertron	Additional Voices	51 episodes
2005	Monarch of the Glen	Bill	Episode: "Episode #7.4"
2005	Broken News	Miles Anderton	4 episodes
2006	Ultimate Force	Lt. Pincher	Episode: "Dividing Line"
2006	The Only Boy for Me	NY Colleague	Television film
2007	Soviet War Scare 1987	Narrator	Television film; documentary
2007	Inside Brookhaven Obesity Clinic	Narrator	6 episodes
2007–2008	Weaponology	Narrator	Documentary series
2007–2009	Storm Hawks	Various Cyclonian Talons	45 episodes
2007	Hotel Babylon	Texan Cliff Barnes	Episode: "Episode #2.1"
2008	Clone	American Golfer	Episode: "The Line"
2008	Zorro Generation Z	Additional Voices	26 episodes
2008	Dork Hunters from Outer Space	Additional voices	Episode: "The Falcon"
2010	The Special Relationship	Reporter	Television film
2011–2012	Transformers: Prime	Additional voices	12 episodes
2012	Top Secret Weapons Revealed	Narrator	Episode: "Weapons of the Superspies"
2013	The Vatican	Reporter	Television film
2013	Nixon's the One	Bill Headline	Episode: "TV"
2014	Obsession: Dark Desires	Alan	Episode: "Screams in the Desert"
2014	CIA Declassified	Narrator	Episode: "Killing Mad Dog Gaddafi"
2014	The Assets	Interviewee #1	Episode: "Avenger"
2015–2017	Dr. Jeff: Rocky Mountain Vet	Narrator	22 episodes
2016	Undercover	Dr. Francis	Episode: "#1.1"
2016	Amazing Animal Selfies	Narrator	Television film
2016	Prisoner Zero	Additional voices	Voice, episode: "Rogue"
2016	Thomas & Friends	Stanley	Voice, episode: "Pouty James"
2017	America's War on Drugs	Rob Maheu	Episode: "Cocaine, Cartels, and Crackdowns"
2017	Spider-Man	A.I.M. Soldier #3	Voice, episode: "Symbiotic Relationship"
2017	Sheriff Callie's Wild West	Calamity Caleb	Voice
2018	Trust	Lang Jeffries	5 episodes
2019	Dark Mon£y	Jotham Starr	4 episodes Television miniseries
2019–2021	Fast & Furious Spy Racers	Additional voices	12 episodes
2019	The Mallorca Files	Abe Steiner	Episode: "Number One Fan"
2020	The Queen's Gambit	Mr. Booth	Episode: "End Game"; Television miniseries
2022–2023	Tom Clancy's Jack Ryan	Thomas Miller	6 episodes
2023–present	The Diplomat	Roger Post	Recurring cast
2023	Captain Laserhawk: A Blood Dragon Remix	Raymond "T-Bone" Kenney, additional voices	Recurring cast
2024	Masters of the Air	Lt. Col. James W. Lann	Episode: "Part Nine"; Television miniseries
2024	Grace	Eric Klein	Episode: "Love You Dead"
2024	A Very Royal Scandal	Andrew Brettler	Television miniseries Credited as John Schwabb
2025	7 Bears	Prince Charmless	Voice
2026	Law & Order: Special Victims Unit	Dr. Jonah Catmull	Episode: "Vivid"

=== Video games ===
Year	Title	Role	Notes
2002	Vietcong	Additional voices	
2002	Prisoner of War	Additional voices	Also in special thanks
2002	Simple 2000 Series, Vol. 16: The Sniper 2	Harry Spencer	
2004	Shrek 2	Writer	
2004	Vietcong: Fist Alpha	Additional voices	
2004	Vietcong: Purple Haze	Additional voices	
2004	Killzone	ISA Troops	
2006	Pursuit Force	Additional voices	
2006	Killzone: Liberation	ISA Demolition Guy, ISA Demolition Man	
2007	Crysis	Crewman 1	
2008	Age of Conan: Hyborian Adventures	Additional voices	
2008	Crysis Warhead	Dane	
2008	Mirror's Edge	Generic SWAT #2 Male	
2009	Killzone 2	ISA Troops	
2011	Operation Flashpoint: Red River	Additional voices	
2011	The Witcher 2: Assassins of Kings	Dandelion	English version
2011	Kinect Disneyland Adventures	Additional voices	
2013	Crysis 3	Teammate #7	
2013	Lego City Undercover	Additional voices	
2013	Grid 2	Additional voices	
2013	Company of Heroes 2	The Western Front Armies DLC, Ardennes Assault DLC	
2013	Killzone: Shadow Fall	VSA Soldier	
2014	Alien: Isolation	Additional voices	
2015	Grey Goo	Additional voices	
2015	The Witcher 3: Wild Hunt	Dandelion	English version
2015	Star Wars: Battlefront	Additional voices	
2016	Quantum Break	Additional voices	
2016	The Witcher 3: Wild Hunt - Blood and Wine	Dandelion	English version
2016	Battlefield 1	Additional voices	
2016	Trials of the Blood Dragon	The Guardian, Black Sinja, Blue Sinja	
2017	Horizon Zero Dawn	Walla Walla	
2017	Xenoblade Chronicles 2	Jin	English version
2017	Lego Marvel Super Heroes 2	Peter Quill / Star-Lord	
2017	The Lego Ninjago Movie Video Game	Zane, Movie Star, Samurai #2, Temple Repairman	
2017	Star Wars: Battlefront II	Additional voices	
2018	Xenoblade Chronicles 2: Torna – The Golden Country	Jin	English version
2019	Jumanji: The Video Game	Additional voices	
2020	Cyberpunk 2077	Brick	
2022	Lego Star Wars: The Skywalker Saga	Additional Voices	
2023	Dead Island 2	Trent, Luther, Zephron	
2023	Atomic Heart	Victor Petrov	English version

=== Radio ===
Year	Title	Role	Notes
2006	Doctor Who: The Nowhere Place	EXO Moore	
2006	Doctor Who: The Reaping	Lieutenant Doyle	
2007	Doctor Who: Phobos	Hayd	
2008	Stargate SG-1: Gift of the Gods	Lt. Hunter	
2019	Doctor Who: Harry Houdini's War	Harry Houdini	
2021	Hennikay	Don	

=== Stage ===
Year	Title	Role	Notes
1998	Picasso: Art is Crime	Stanley	
2006	Six Dance Lessons in Six Weeks	Understudy	
2008	Speed the Plow	Bobby (Understudy)	
2010	True West	Saul Kimmer	
2013	Yellow Face	Rocco Palmierei, Senator John Kerry, others	
2013	Our Ajax	Menelaus	
2014	Yellow Face	Rocco Palmierei, Senator John Kerry, Various	
