= Lawrence Jacomelli =

English filmmaker

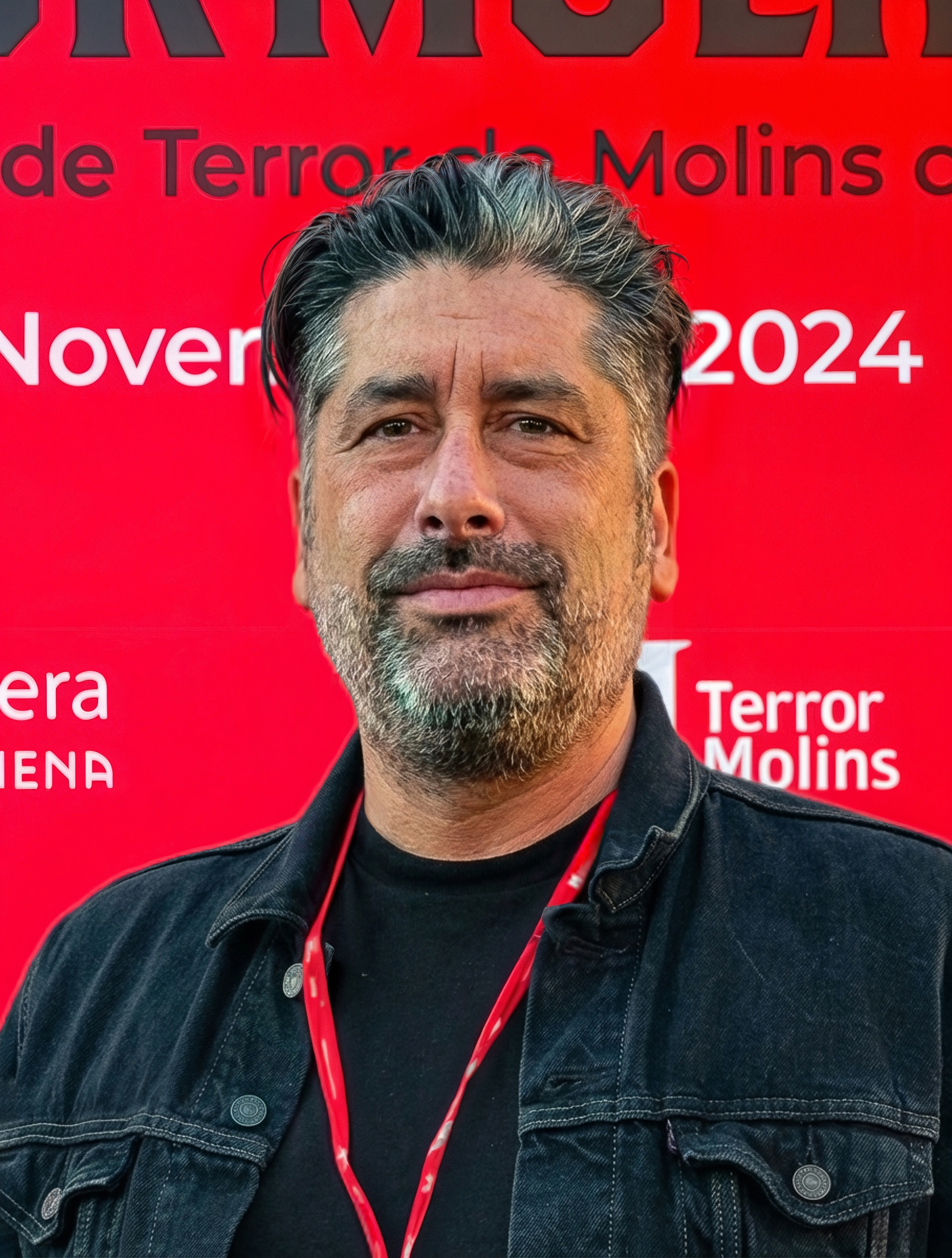
- Born: January 14, 1974 (age 52); London, England
- Education: University of the West of England
- Occupations: Film director; film producer; screenwriter
- Years active: 2005–present

Lawrence Jacomelli (born 14 January 1974) is an English filmmaker. Known for his work in advertising and branded content, he has directed campaigns for major global brands. In 2024, he made his feature-film debut with Blood Star, a tense, character-driven road thriller that marked his transition into narrative filmmaking. The film premiered at the 2024 Neuchâtel International Fantastic Film Festival and later screened at Grimmfest and the Cinequest Film & Creativity Festival.

== Career ==
Jacomelli directed his first television commercial in 2002, an IKEA spot that received a Cannes Lions shortlist nomination and a bronze Epica Award. His breakthrough came in 2004 with Precious, a Lord of the Rings parody for Pot Noodle that he wrote, produced and directed. The spot earned him Best Director at the Viral Awards in London and New York and led to a shortlist nomination for the CFP-E Young Director Award at Cannes Lions. His commercial work includes campaigns for brands such as British Airways, Pepsi, Persil, Toyota, Chevrolet, Lexus, Orange, T-Mobile, Tuborg, Carlsberg, Vanity Fair, McDonalds, KFC, Pizza Hut, and Swatch.

In 2014, Jacomelli and creative director Victoria Taylor co-founded Beast Films, a production company and creative agency based in Haggerston, London. The company became known for cinematic commercial storytelling, producing award-winning work for clients including Cambridge Audio, Burger King, Goodman Masson, the Multiple Sclerosis Society, Herbalife and Voltaren. In 2019, Jacomelli directed a commercial for Simba Sleep as part of the brand's Try for 8 campaign promoting rest and recovery ahead of the 2019 Rugby World Cup in Japan, featuring Saracens F.C. and England captain Maro Itoje.

In 2023, Jacomelli and Taylor founded Fastback Films, a sister company to Beast dedicated to long-form narrative production. Its first project was Blood Star, Jacomelli's feature debut as a writer, producer and director, filmed over ten days, starring John Schwab and Britni Camacho.

== Filmography ==
=== Feature films ===
| Year | Title | Distributors |
|---|---|---|
| 2024 | Blood Star | Quiver Distribution, Plaion |

=== Selected commercials ===
- Orange – Rooster (2001)
- Child Seat Belts – Egg (2002)
- IKEA – Go Uncubic (2003)
- Swatch – Diver (2004)
- Vanity Fair – Blah (2006)
- Toyota – Hitchhiker (2008)
- Wrigley's (2009)
- KFC (2010)
- T-Mobile – Bike (2012)
- Magnum (2015)
- IKEA – Kitchen (2017)
- Burger King – Whopper No Show (2018)
- British Airways – Moments (2019)
- Simba Sleep – Try for 8 (2019)
- LG – Tone Free (2021)
- Bernard H. Mayer – Journey (2023)

== Accolades ==
| Award | Year | Category | Recipient(s) | Result | Ref. |
|---|---|---|---|---|---|
| Cannes Lions International Festival of Creativity | 2002 | | Go Uncubic (IKEA) | Shortlist | |
| Cannes Lions International Festival of Creativity | 2006 | | Hide and Seek (ANDCP) | Shortlist | |
| Cannes Lions International Festival of Creativity | 2009 | | Girls Night Out (121.ro) | Shortlist | |
| Cannes Lions International Festival of Creativity | 2010 | | Commentator (Voltaren) | Shortlist | |
| Cannes Lions International Festival of Creativity | 2011 | | Earthquake (Multiple Sclerosis) | Shortlist | |
| Cannes Lions International Festival of Creativity | 2018 | Acquisition & Retention | Whopper No Show (Burger King) | Bronze | |
| Dubai Lynx Awards | 2008 | Cars & Automotive Services | The Mime (Chevrolet) | Silver | |
| New York & London Viral Awards | 2004 | Best Direction | Precious (Pot Noodle) | Won | |
| Epica Awards | 2002 | Home, Furnishings & Appliances | Go Uncubic (IKEA) | Bronze | |
| Eurobest Awards | 2009 | Best Use of Film Direction | Girls Night Out (121.ro) | Bronze | |
| Golden Drum Awards | 2010 | Health & Beauty | Commentator (Voltaren) | Silver | |
| Golden Drum Awards | 2018 | | Whopper No Show (Burger King) | Silver | |
