= Z-Mom =

- Theatrical release poster
- Directed by: Kou Darachan
- Written by: Bun Channimol; Sorn Sreylin
- Starring: Rern Sinat; John Maclaren; Leav Veng Hour
- Cinematography: Suk Dara
- Production company: Sastra Film
- Distributed by: Blue River Films; Sastra Plus
- Release date: August 15, 2024 (Cambodia)
- Running time: 90 minutes
- Country: Cambodia
- Language: Central Khmer

Z-Mom is a 2024 Cambodian drama zombie film written by Bun Channimol and Sorn Sreylin and directed by Kou Darachan. It stars Rern Sinat, John Maclaren, Leav Veng Hour. The film is about a mother who protects her family from a zombie outbreak.

== Plot ==
A woman, her husband (Leav Veng Hour), and their children embarking on a family trip to a secluded island. The island is operated by a private corporation owned by a foreign acquaintance, Robert (John Maclaren). Initially, the island appears to be a serene getaway, but subtle signs such as unusually aggressive wildlife and unsettling local behavior.

As the family settles in, a mysterious illness begins to spread among the island's inhabitants. Symptoms escalate rapidly: high fevers, violent outbursts, and a ravenous hunger for flesh. Panic ensues as the infected turn into zombies, attacking anyone in sight. In a desperate bid for survival, the family attempts to flee, but chaos reigns. The husband is bitten during an ambush, and despite the mother's efforts, he succumbs to the infection, transforming into one of the undead.

The mother manages to escape with her infant child, seeking refuge in an abandoned facility. There, she encounters other survivors, including a group of scientists who reveal that the outbreak is the result of a failed experiment aimed at enhancing human resilience. The virus, however, mutated uncontrollably, leading to the current catastrophe.

Tragedy strikes when the infant shows signs of infection. Despite administering experimental treatments, the child deteriorates and eventually turns. Faced with the loss of her entire family, the mother contemplates ending her own life. In a moment of despair, she allows herself to be bitten, intending to join her loved ones in undeath.

As the infection takes hold, the mother experiences vivid memories of her family, reigniting her will to live. She fights the transformation, aided by a rare immunity identified by the scientists. Harnessing this immunity, she becomes a beacon of hope, leading missions to rescue other survivors and combat the zombie horde.

The mother confronts Robert, who reveals that the outbreak was a deliberate act to test the virus's capabilities. A fierce battle ensues, culminating in Robert's demise and the destruction of the facility responsible for the outbreak. The mother, now a symbol of resilience and hope, continues her mission to find a cure and restore humanity.

== Cast ==
- Rern Sinat as The Mother
- John Maclaren as Robert
- Leav Veng Hour as Husband

== Release ==
The film was released in Cambodia on August 15, 2024 and premiered in the Philippines at "Aughost Exclusives" alongside Taiwanese horror film Mystery Writers, Thai horror thriller film The Cursed Land and Singaporean horror film Haunted Universities at SM Cinemas on August 28 to September 3, 2024.
