= Miss Cambodia =

Beauty pageant

Miss Cambodia Beauty Pageant
- Formation: 2016; 10 years ago
- Purpose: Beauty pageant
- Headquarters: Phnom Penh
- Location: Cambodia
- Director: Romyr Libo-on
- Affiliations: Miss Universe; Miss World; Miss International; Miss Earth; Miss Supranational; Miss Global; Miss Tourism International; Miss Asia Pacific International; Miss Charm; Miss Eco International
- Website: misscambodia.org; ariseagency.com

Miss Cambodia is a national beauty pageant in Cambodia which also selects other winners to participate in big beauty pageants like Miss Universe (separate pageant under Miss Cambodia), Miss International, and Miss Earth. The Miss Cambodia Organization also selects the other winners to participate in smaller pageants such as Miss Asia Pacific International, and Miss Tourism International.

== History ==
On 14 October 2016, Cambodia saw five winners crowned at the NagaWorld Hotel in Phnom Penh. The pageant was organized by Arise Agency Ltd. The pageant aims to be an annual national pageant aimed in sending representatives to international beauty pageants. It selects Cambodian representatives to compete in three of the four big International pageants including Miss Universe, Miss International and Miss Earth.

The pageant also send five winners to other minor international pageants including Miss Tourism International, and Miss Asia Pacific International.

== Events ==
Miss Universe Cambodia holds a National Costume Competition. The grand final will be Live on CTN (Cambodia National TV Channel).

On March 31, 2019, the Miss Cambodia crowned at the Naba Theater, Nagaworld Hotel, Phnom Penh. The winners of Miss Cambodia are expected to represent Cambodia in international competitions including Miss Universe, Miss International, Miss Earth, Miss Tourism International and Miss Asia Pacific.

== Miss Cambodia ==
=== Miss Cambodia ===
Year	Miss Cambodia	Runners Up				Venue	Entrants
Year	Miss Cambodia	First Runner-Up	Second Runner-Up	Third Runner-Up	Fourth Runner-Up	Venue	Entrants
Miss Universe Cambodia
2016	Sotheary By	Em Kunthong	Chhay Nita	Ly Naisim	Pen Punnavath	Naga World Hotel and Resorts, Phnom Penh	20
2017	Rern Sinat	Keo Senglyhour	Kem Sreykeo	Long Punleu	Kha Annchhany	Naga World Hotel and Resorts, Phnom Penh	20
2018	No contest — Starting 2019, Miss Cambodia was renamed as Miss Universe Cambodia						
Miss World Cambodia
2020	Phum Sophorn	Pich Votey Saravody	Keo Sreylin	Not Awarded	Not Awarded	Nagaworld hotel, grand ballroom, Phnom Penh	23
Miss International Cambodia
Year	Miss Cambodia	Miss Earth Cambodia	Miss Tourism Cambodia	Runners Up		Venue	Entrants
Year	Miss Cambodia	Miss Earth Cambodia	Miss Tourism Cambodia	First Runner-Up	Second Runner-Up	Venue	Entrants
2021	Chea Charany	Dam Sopheaksindy	Mao Reaksmy	Cheng Sokpheaktra	Houn Sreykhouch	The Olympia Mall, Phnom Penh	20
Year	Miss Cambodia	Runners Up				Venue	Entrants
Year	Miss Cambodia	First Runner-Up	Second Runner-Up	Third Runner-Up	Fourth Runner-Up	Venue	Entrants
2024	Chanreaksmey Loy	Savannah Richana Mean	Mei Chann Lao	Savuth Serafina	Sreyneang		21
2025						the studio Bayon TV in Phnom Penh	

==== Winners by province ====
Provinces	Titles	Winning years
Battambang	1	2021
Takéo	1	2020
Kampong Cham	1	2017
Phnom Penh	1	2016

=== Miss Universe Cambodia ===
Year	Miss Universe Cambodia	Runners Up				Venue	Entrants
Year	Miss Universe Cambodia	First Runner-Up	Second Runner-Up	Third Runner-Up	Fourth Runner-Up	Venue	Entrants
2019	Somnang Alyna	Thoung Mala	John Sotima	Pokimtheng Sothida	Kachnak Thyda Bon	NABA Theatre, Naga 2, Phnom Penh	25
2020	Sarita Reth	Raksa Chhun	Dy Sorakheta	Raksa Neth	Somanika Suon	NABA Theatre, Naga 2, Phnom Penh	20
2021	Ngin Marady	Chhon Sreynet	Sim Margaret Pich Chornai	Not Awarded	Not Awarded	NABA Theatre, Naga 2, Phnom Penh	19
2022	Hang Manita	Heng Sothnisay	Heng Bonika	Ratana Sokhavatey	Hun Geklang	Bayon TV Steung Meanchey Studio, Phnom Penh	20
2023	Sotima John	Sai Fhon	Bormey Vannak	Pisey Channa	Kolianne Maifait	Bayon TV Steung Meanchey Studio, Phnom Penh	35
2024	Davin Prasath	Not Awarded	Not Awarded	Not Awarded	Not Awarded	Camwood CTN Studio, Phnom Penh	5

==== Winners by province ====
Provinces	Titles	Winning years
Phnom Penh	5	2019, 2020, 2021, 2022, 2024
Kampong Cham	1	2023

=== Miss World Cambodia ===
Year	Miss World Cambodia	Runners Up				Venue	Entrants
Year	Miss World Cambodia	First Runner-Up	Second Runner-Up	Third Runner-Up	Fourth Runner-Up	Venue	Entrants
2019	Vy Sreyvin	In Leakena	Yorn SomPhors	Not Awarded	Not Awarded	CTN TV's studio, Phnom Penh	20
2020	Miss World Cambodia renamed as Miss Cambodia						
2021	Sary Sovattey	Sim Chansreymom	Ear Linza	Nhoeurn Sophorn	Nou Rita	Nagaworld hotel, grand ballroom, Phnom Penh	23
2022	Teng Sreypich	Vun Sreynich	Chheang Linda	Not Awarded	Not Awarded	Nagaworld hotel, grand ballroom, Phnom Penh	20
2025	Julia Russell	Not Awarded	Not Awarded	Not Awarded	Not Awarded	—	6

==== Winners by province ====
Provinces	Titles	Winning years
Banteay Meanchey	1	2023
Kratié	1	2021
Kandal	1	2019

=== Miss Earth Cambodia ===
Year	Miss Earth Cambodia	Runners Up					Venue	Entrants
Year	Miss Earth Cambodia	First Runner-Up	Second Runner-Up	Third Runner-Up	Fourth Runner-Up	Fifth Runner-Up	Venue	Entrants
2024	Rotha Pyhadeth	Som Monipich	Kosal Pichchornay	Mon Sreypov	Kol Nika	Ratana Sok Chhouk Savy TBA TBA TBA	AEON Mall Phnom Penh, Phnom Penh	30

==== Winners by province ====
Provinces	Titles	Winning years
Kandal	1	2024

=== Miss Supranational Cambodia ===
Year	Miss Supranational Cambodia	Runners Up				Venue	Entrants
Year	Miss Supranational Cambodia	First Runner-Up	Second Runner-Up	Third Runner-Up	Fourth Runner-Up	Venue	Entrants
2023	Chily Tevy	Khemma Metayer	Leak Monyanita	Houn Srey Khouch	Yi Srey Pov	Grand Ballroom of Morgan Tower, Phnom Penh	18
2025	Chhum Chandara	Sydney Marith	Hok Sarytola	Va Malina	Kang Soton Le A	Aeon Mall Mean Chey, Phnom Penh	14
2026							

==== Winners by province ====
Provinces	Titles	Winning years
Phnom Penh	1	2025
Kampong Thom	1	2023

=== Miss Grand Cambodia ===
Year	Miss Grand Cambodia	Runners Up				Venue	Entrants
Year	Miss Grand Cambodia	First Runner-Up	Second Runner-Up	Third Runner-Up	Fourth Runner-Up	Venue	Entrants
2015	Seng Polvithavy	Kim Katiyak Kanha	Srey Sathyaphoung	Not awarded	Not awarded	Nagaworld Hotel Grand Ballroom, Phnom Penh	24
2016	Heng Chantha	Bun Leakhena	Chea Gekheang	Song Chev Vicheka	Chev Thavary	Nagaworld Hotel Grand Ballroom, Phnom Penh	23
2017	Khloem Sreykea	Nhert Sophea	Mony Monyta	John Sotima	Not awarded	Nagaworld Hotel Grand Ballroom, Phnom Penh	18
2018	Lika Dy	Dy Sorakheta	Lim Sophalidet	Sarith Lyka	Chhom Phally	Nagaworld Hotel Grand Ballroom, Phnom Penh	27
2019	Det Sreyneat	San Sievling	Touch Meangleang	Not awarded	Not awarded	Nagaworld Hotel Grand Ballroom, Phnom Penh	29
2020	Seng Rotha (Resigned) Chily Tevy (Successor)	Lim Sotheavy (Resigned) Vuth Thidavin (Successor)	Chily Tevy (Resigned) Sarom Chantha (Successor)	Vuth Thidavin (Resigned) Morm Rany (Successor)	Sarom Chantha (Resigned) Khat Sreychan (Successor)	The Premier Center Sen Sok, Phnom Penh	28
2021	Sothida Pokimtheng	Leakhena In	Em Kunthong	Keo Senglyhour	Sok Ratcharakorn	AEON Mall, Sen Sok City, Phnom Penh	25
2022	Saravody Pich Votey	Soriyan Hang	Naly Lim	Sreylin Keo	Thavary Pheab	The Union of Youth Federations of Cambodia, Phnom Penh	35
2023	Sreynor Phem	Anna Koy	Leakhena In	Sreynit Sou	Nongnith Men	Koh Pich Theater, Phnom Penh	25
2024	Sotheary By	Sreyneth Ry	Panhavimealea Dy	Davy Mach	Phattiya Phou	Koh Pich Theater, Phnom Penh	28

5th Runner-Up

Year	Runners Up					
Year	Fifth Runner-Up	Fifth Runner-Up	Fifth Runner-Up	Fifth Runner-Up	Fifth Runner-Up	Fifth Runner-Up
2024	Sreypi Phorn	Kunthea Thy	Socheata Kong	Thida Pov	Lida Sin	Sovannrothana Morn

==== Winners by province ====
Provinces	Titles	Winning years
Phnom Penh	5	2015, 2016, 2017, 2019, 2023
Kampong Chhnang	1	2024
Preah Sihanouk	1	2022
Battambang	1	2021
Banteay Meanchey	1	2020
Kampong Thom	1	2020*
Kampong Cham	1	2018

=== Miss Cosmo Cambodia ===
Year	Miss Cosmo Cambodia	Runner Up	Inspiring Beauty	Graceful Spirit	Radiant Elegance	Venue	Entrants
2025	Phorn SreyPii	Sotheary Bee	Mean Savannah	Asora Monica	Saran Kimlang	Koh Pich Theater, Phnom Penh	24

==== Winners by province ====
Provinces	Titles	Winning years
Kandal	1	2025

== International pageants ==
- : Declared as Winner
- : Ended as runner-up or top 5/6 qualification
- : Ended as one of the finalists or semifinalists
- : Ended as special awards winner

=== Miss Universe Cambodia ===
The winner of Miss Universe Cambodia represents her country at the Miss Universe. On occasion, when the winner does not qualify (due to age) a runner-up is sent.

Year	Province	Miss Cambodia	National Title	Placement at Miss Universe	Special Awards
2026	Kampong Cham	Than Rthna	Miss Universe Cambodia 2026	TBA	
2025	Phnom Penh	Nearysocheata Thai	Miss Universe Cambodia 2025	Unplaced	
2024	Phnom Penh	Davin Prasath	Miss Universe Cambodia 2024	Top 30	Voice For Change (Gold Winner)
2023	Kampong Cham	Sotima John	Miss Universe Cambodia 2023	Unplaced	
2022	Phnom Penh	Manita Hang	Miss Universe Cambodia 2022	Unplaced	
2021	Phnom Penh	Ngin Marady	Miss Universe Cambodia 2021	Unplaced	
2020	Phnom Penh	Sarita Reth	Miss Universe Cambodia 2020	Unplaced	
2019	Phnom Penh	Somnang Alyna	Miss Universe Cambodia 2019	Unplaced	
2018	Kampong Cham	Rern Sinat	Miss Cambodia 2017	Unplaced	
2017	Phnom Penh	By Sotheary	Miss Cambodia 2016	Unplaced	

=== Miss World Cambodia ===
Year	Province	Miss Cambodia	National Title	Placement at Miss World	Special Awards
2026	Phnom Penh	Leakena In	Miss World Cambodia 2026	Top 40	People’s Choice Winner; Miss World Top Model (Top 21)
2025	Phnom Penh	Julia Russell	Miss World Cambodia 2025	Unplaced	
2024	No competition held				
2023	Banteay Meanchey	Teng Sreypich	Miss World Cambodia 2022	Unplaced	
2022	Kratié	Sary Sovattey	Miss World Cambodia 2021	Miss World 2021 was rescheduled to 16 March 2022 due to the COVID-19 pandemic outbreak in Puerto Rico, no edition started in 2022	
2021	Takéo	Phum Sophorn	Miss Cambodia 2020	Unplaced	
2020	Due to the impact of COVID-19 pandemic, no competition held				
2019	Kandal	Vy Sreyvin	Miss World Cambodia 2019	Unplaced	
Did not compete between 2007—2018
2006	Kampong Cham	Sun Sreymom	Appointed	Unplaced	

=== Miss International Cambodia ===
Year	Province	Miss Cambodia	National Title	Placement at Miss International	Special Awards
2026	Phnom Penh	Kimleang Sokea	Miss International Cambodia 2026	TBA	TBA
2025	Kampot	Pichvoleak So	Miss International Cambodia 2025	Unplaced	
2024	Phnom Penh	Chanreaksmey Loy	Miss Cambodia 2024	Unplaced	
2023	Phnom Penh	Somnang Alyna	Miss Universe Cambodia 2019	Unplaced	
2022	Battambang	Chea Charany	Miss Cambodia 2021	Unplaced	
Due to the impact of COVID-19 pandemic, no pageant between 2020—2021
2019	Phnom Penh	Kachnak Thyda Bon	4th Runner-up of Miss Universe Cambodia 2019	Unplaced	
2018	Phnom Penh	Dy Sokrakheta	1st Runner-up of Miss Grand Cambodia 2018	Did not compete	
2017	Phnom Penh	Nhert Sophea	1st Runner-up of Miss Grand Cambodia 2017	Unplaced	

=== Miss Earth Cambodia ===
Year	Province	Miss Cambodia	National Title	Placement at Miss Earth	Special Awards
2025	Kampong Cham	Kimlan Saran	Appointed	Unplaced	
2024	Kandal	Rotha Pyhadeth	Miss Earth Cambodia 2024	Unplaced	
2023	Stung Treng	Pouvjessica Tan	Appointed	Unplaced	
2022	Phnom Penh	Soriyan Hang	1st Runner-up of Miss Grand Cambodia 2022	Did not compete	
2021	Pursat	Dam Sopheaksindy	Miss Cambodia 2021 (For Miss Earth 2021)	Unplaced	
2020	Phnom Penh	Nisay Heng	1st Runner-up of Miss Universe Cambodia 2022	Unplaced	1 Special Awards: (gold) Talent (Sing Category) Asia & Oceania
2019	Kandal	Thoung Mala	1st Runner-up of Miss Universe Cambodia 2019	Unplaced	
2018	Phnom Penh	Keo Senglyhour	1st Runner-up of Miss Cambodia 2017	Unplaced	
2017	Sihanoukville	Em Kunthong	1st Runner-up of Miss Cambodia 2016	Unplaced	
Did not compete between 2006—2016
2005	Phnom Penh	Mealea Pich	Appointed	Unplaced	

=== Miss Supranational Cambodia ===
Year	Province	Miss Cambodia	National Title	Placement at Miss Supranational	Special Awards
2026	Battambang	Sarytola Hok	Miss Supranational Cambodia 2026	Top 24	Supra Influencer
2025	Phnom Penh	Chhum Chandara	Miss Supranational Cambodia 2025	Unplaced	1 Special Awards: Miss Influencer (Top 20)
2024	Phnom Penh	Chhum Chandara	Appointed	Did not compete	
2023	Kampong Thom	Chily Tevy	Miss Supranational Cambodia 2023	Unplaced	1 Special Awards: Miss Talent (Top 29)
2022	Kampong Cham	In Leakena	1st Runner-up of Miss Grand Cambodia 2021	Unplaced	
Did not compete between 2015—2021
2014	Phnom Penh	Lynda Muna	Appointed	Did not compete	

=== Miss Grand International ===
Year	Province	Miss Cambodia	National Title	Placement at Miss Grand International	Special Awards
2024	Kampong Chhnang	Sotheary By	Miss Grand Cambodia 2024	Did not compete	
2023	Phnom Penh	Phoem Sreyno	Miss Grand Cambodia 2023	Unplaced	3 Special Awards: Best in Swimsuit (Top 10); Country's Power of the year (Top 10); Best in National Costume (Top 10)
2022	Preah Sihanouk	Pich Votey Saravody	Miss Grand Cambodia 2022	5th Runner-up (Dethroned)	3 Special Awards: Best in Swimsuit (Fans Vote) (Top 10); Before Arrival (Top 10); Best in National Costume (Top 20)
2021	Battambang	Pokimtheng Sothida	Miss Grand Cambodia 2021	Top 10	4 Special Awards: Miss Popular Vote; Best in Swimsuit (Fans Vote) (Top 3); Before Arrival (Top 5); Best in National Costume (Top 10)
2020	Banteay Meanchey	Chily Tevy	Miss Grand Cambodia 2020 (Successor)	Top 20	8 Special Awards: Country’s Choice of the year; Queens with the Golden Crown; How to eat Thai food in 2 minute; How to get to know you in 1 minute; Best in National Costume (Top 6); Miss Popular Vote (Top 7); Best in Swimsuit (Top 10); Grand Pageant's Choice Award
2020	Kampong Thom	Seng Rotha	Miss Grand Cambodia 2020 (Resigned)	Did not compete	
2019	Phnom Penh	Det Sreyneat	Miss Grand Cambodia 2019	Did not compete	
2018	Kampong Cham	Dy Molika	Miss Grand Cambodia 2018	Unplaced	4 Special Awards: Hottest Contestants for Preliminary (Top 5); Most-Liked and Shared Official Portrait Photos (Top 9); Miss Popular Vote (Top 10); Best in National Costume (Top 12)
2017	Phnom Penh	Khloem Sreykea	Miss Grand Cambodia 2017	Unplaced	4 Special Awards: The Front Row of Opening Dance (Top 3); Best in National Costume (Top 10); Best in Swimsuit (Top 10); Grand Pageant's Choice Award
2016	Phnom Penh	Heng Chantha	Miss Grand Cambodia 2016	Did not compete	
2015	Phnom Penh	Seng Polvithavy	Miss Grand Cambodia 2015	Unplaced	
2014	Phnom Penh	Tim Sreyneat	Appointed	Unplaced	1 Special Awards: Miss Popular Vote
2013	Phnom Penh	Chan Srey Neang	Appointed	Did not compete	

=== Miss Charm Cambodia ===
Year	Province	Miss Cambodia	National Title	Placement at Miss Charm	Special Awards
2025	Phnom Penh	Sreyneat Det	Miss Lakamo 2025	Top 20	Best in Social Media
2023	Phnom Penh	Sotheary By	Miss Cambodia 2016	Unplaced	1 Special Award: Best National Costume

=== Miss Cosmo Cambodia ===
Year	Province	Miss Cambodia	National Title	Placement at Miss Cosmo	Special Awards
2025	Kandal	Phorn SreyPii	Miss Cosmo Cambodia 2025	Top 20	
2024	Kampong Cham	In Leakena	2nd Runner-up of Miss Grand Cambodia 2023	Top 10	2 Special Award: Cosmo Social Ambassador Award; Top 3 – Best National Costume

=== Miss Global Cambodia ===
Year	Province	Miss Cambodia	National Title	Placement at Miss Global	Special Awards
2025	Battambang	Khon Srey Khouch	Miss Global Cambodia 2024	Unplaced	
2024	No competition held				
2023	Battambang	Leak Monyanita	2nd Runner-up of Miss Supranational Cambodia 2023	Top 13	
2022	Sihanoukville	Em Kunthong	2nd Runner-up of Miss Grand Cambodia 2021	Unplaced	
2021	Phnom Penh	Jazmine Vitacco	Miss Northridge USA 2020	Did not compete	1 Special Award: Miss Fashion
2020	Due to the impact of COVID-19 pandemic, no competition held				
2019	Phnom Penh	Jannie Lam	Appointed	Unplaced	
2018	Phnom Penh	Hang Soriyan	1st Runner-up of Miss Grand Cambodia 2022	Top 11	1 Special Award: Miss Popular Vote
2017	Phnom Penh	Paulina Yos	Appointed	Top 11	2 Special Award: Miss Ganzberg; Best National Beauty
2016	Phnom Penh	Dane Ny	Appointed	Top 20	
2015	Phnom Penh	Virginia Prak	Appointed	1st Runner-up	
2014	Did not compete				
2013	Phnom Penh	Soma H	Appointed	Unplaced	

=== Miss Asia Pacific Cambodia ===
Year	Province	Miss Cambodia	National Title	Placement at Miss Asia Pacific International	Special Awards
2025	California	Mealyann Nita Saing	1st runner-up of Miss Universe Cambodia 2024	Top 30	4 Special Award: Miss Eventologie; Miss Cindyrella Drip; Top 5 – Miss Photogenic; Top 12 – Peoples Choice
Due to the impact of COVID-19 pandemic, no pageant in 2020—2023
2019	Phnom Penh	Sothida Pokimtheng	3rd Runner-up of Miss Universe Cambodia 2019	Unplaced	
2018	Kampong Cham	Annchhany Kha	4th Runner-up of Miss Cambodia 2017	Unplaced	

=== Miss Intercontinental Cambodia ===
Year	Province	Miss Cambodia	National Title	Placement at Miss Intercontinental	Special Awards
2025	Battambang	Hok Sarytola	2nd Runner-up of Miss Supranational Cambodia 2025	Unplaced	
2024	Kandal	Phorn SreyPii	5th Runner-up of Miss Grand Cambodia 2024	Top 22	
2023	Díd not compete				
2022	Phnom Penh	Sim Chansreymom	1st Runner-up of Miss World Cambodia 2021	Unplaced	
2021	Phnom Penh	Pich Votey Saravody	1st Runner-up of Miss Cambodia 2020	Did not compete	

=== Miss Eco Cambodia ===
Year	Province	Miss Cambodia	National Title	Placement at Miss Eco International	Special Awards
2023	Phnom Penh	Ratana Sokhavatey	3rd Runner-up of Miss Universe Cambodia 2022	3rd Runner-up	1 Special Award: Best Eco Video

=== Miss Celebrity International ===
Year	Province	Miss Cambodia	National Title	Placement at Miss Celebrity International	Special Awards
2024	Phnom Penh	Julia Russell	Appointed	Top 15	
2023	Phnom Penh	Phay Valiza	Appointed	Unplaced	

=== Miss Petite Globe Cambodia ===
Year	Province	Miss Cambodia	National Title	Placement at Miss Charm	Special Awards
2022	Phnom Penh	Sreypich Mainavyta	Top 10 at Miss Universe Cambodia 2022	Miss Petite Global 2022	

== Mister Cambodia ==
=== Mister Cambodia ===
Year	Mister Cambodia	Runners Up			Venue	Entrants
Year	Mister Cambodia	First Runner-Up	Second Runner-Up	Third Runner-Up	Venue	Entrants
2016	Pen Brospov	Nhem Cheasothea	Som Reakamey	Not Awarded	AEON MALL Sen Sok City, Phnom Penh	19
2018	Dy Vanda	Kim Pheaktra	Los Farid	Not Awarded	AEON MALL Sen Sok City, Phnom Penh	10
2019	Vorm Sela	Long Ratana	Sim Ravuth	Not Awarded	AEON MALL Sen Sok City, Phnom Penh	12
2020	Noun Rothsomnangvorakboth	Nak Pisey	Phal Sopheng	Not Awarded	AEON MALL Sen Sok City, Phnom Penh	30
2021	Olivier Sara	Hor Sovankirida	Veasna Royal	Not Awarded	AEON MALL Sen Sok City, Phnom Penh	25
2022	Khorn Lythean	Moeurn Phearath	Mouern Kanal	Not Awarded	AEON MALL Sen Sok City, Phnom Penh	20
Year	Mister Global Cambodia	First Runner-Up	Mister International Cambodia	First Runner-Up	Venue	Entrants
2023	Chomreoun Sovananreach	Bou Mai	Hor Sovankirida	Chhin Phearum	AEON MALL Sen Sok City, Phnom Penh	16
Year	Mister Cambodia	First Runner-Up	Second Runner-Up	First Runner-Up	Venue	Entrants
2024	Him Thavyanna	Neov Bunthea	Chhan Lin		AEON MALL Sen Sok City, Phnom Penh	15

==== Winners by province ====
Provinces	Titles	Winning years
Phnom Penh	7	2016, 2018, 2019, 2020, 2021, 2022, 2024
Kandal	1	2023

=== Manhunt Cambodia ===
Year	Manhunt Cambodia	Runners Up		Venue	Entrants
Year	Manhunt Cambodia	First Runner-Up	Second Runner-Up	Venue	Entrants
2012	Sary Phanith	Nou Achhekvichetra	Pang Vong PheakMarin	MH Cambodia organised by Beeline	17

==== Winners by province ====
Provinces	Titles	Winning years
Phnom Penh	1	2012

=== Mister Supranational Cambodia ===
Year	Mister Supranational Cambodia	Runners Up				Venue	Entrants
Year	Mister Supranational Cambodia	First Runner-Up	Second Runner-Up	Third Runner-Up	Fourth Runner-Up	Venue	Entrants
2023	Vorn Sela	Thul Makara	Kon Chhanuth	Sarun Sarun	Rim HakHeng	the Grand Ballroom of Morgan Tower in Koh Pich, Phnom Penh	40
2025	Heab SeangHuy	Meun Ek Sophearith	Pichtip Vibol	Heng Vanseth	Ung Chan Chakkrey	Aeon Mall Mean Chey, Phnom Penh	22

==== Winners by province ====
Provinces	Titles	Winning years
Phnom Penh	1	2025
Pursat	1	2023

== International pageants ==
- : Declared as Winner
- : Ended as runner-up or top 5/6 qualification
- : Ended as one of the finalists or semifinalists
- : Ended as special awards winner

=== Mister World ===
Year	Province	Mister Cambodia	National Title	Placement at Mister World	Special Awards
2024	Kampot	Sokhunrangsey Thul	Mister of Cambodia 2024	Unplaced	1 Special Awards: Top 36 - Talent
2024	Kandal	Chomreoun Sovananreach	Mister Cambodia 2023	Did not compete	
2024	Phnom Penh	Olivier Sara	Mister Cambodia 2021	Did not compete	
2019	Kampong Chhnang	Somkhan Ou	Appointed	Unplaced	1 Special Awards: Top 25 - Top Model

=== Manhunt International ===
Year	Province	Mister Cambodia	National Title	Placement at Manhunt International	Special Awards
2017	Phnom Penh	Eng Sokhoung	Appointed	Unplaced	
2012	Phnom Penh	Sary Phanith	Manhunt Cambodia 2012	Unplaced	
2006	Phnom Penh	Rethy Chey	Appointed	Unplaced	
2005	Phnom Penh	Panharit Chey	Appointed	Unplaced	1 Special Awards: Best National Costume

=== Mister International By Mister International Organization (Thailand-Based) ===
Year	Province	Mister Cambodia	National Title	Placement at Mister International	Special Awards
2024	Battambang	Nop Bunthea	1st Runner-Up Mister Cambodia 2024	Unplaced	
2024	Phnom Penh	Hor Sovankirida	Mister International Cambodia 2024		
2022	Tboung Khmum	Bunchhat Aeat	Appointed	Unplaced	
2016	Phnom Penh	Yoeung Samneang	Appointed	Unplaced	
2015	Phnom Penh	Moeurn Makara	Appointed	Unplaced	

=== Mister International By The MI Organization (Philippine-Based) ===
Year	Province	Mister Cambodia	National Title	Placement at Mister International	Special Awards
2024	Phnom Penh	Ry Sovannak	Appointed	Unplaced	
2023	Phnom Penh	Thea Sok Tola	Appointed	Unplaced	1 Special Awards: 2nd Runner-Up - Best National Costume

=== Mister Global ===
Year	Province	Mister Cambodia	National Title	Placement at Mister Global	Special Awards
2024	Phnom Penh	Yanna Him	Appointed	Unplaced	
2023	Kandal	Chomreoun Sovananreach	Mister Cambodia 2023	Unplaced	
2022	Phnom Penh	Khorn Lythean	Mister Cambodia 2022	Unplaced	
2021	Phnom Penh	Hor Sovankirida	1st Runner-Up Mister Cambodia 2021	Unplaced	
2018	Phnom Penh	Dy Vanda	Mister Cambodia 2018	Unplaced	
2015	Phnom Penh	Touch Kosal	Appointed	Unplaced	

=== Mister Supranational ===
Year	Province	Mister Cambodia	National Title	Placement at Mister Supranational	Special Awards
2025	Phnom Penh	Heab Seanghuy	Mister Supranational Cambodia 2025	Unplaced	
2024	Phnom Penh	Chuop Chakravuth	Appointed	Did not compete	
2023	Pursat	Sela Vorn	Mister Supranational Cambodia 2023	Unplaced	
2022	Siem Reap	Lao Panha	Appointed	Unplaced	

=== Man of the World ===
Year	Province	Mister Cambodia	National Title	Placement at Man of the World	Special Awards
2026	Battambang	Phearum Chhin	Man of the World Cambodia 2026	Unplaced	(bronze) Mister Personality
2025	Phnom Penh	Yu Ey	Man of the World Cambodia 2025	Did not compete	
2024	Sisophon	Rith Siphun	Man of Cambodia 2024	Unplaced	

=== Mister Grand International ===
Year	Province	Mister Cambodia	National Title	Placement at Mister Grand International	Special Awards
2023	Banteay Meanchey	Vutchy Touch	Appointed	Unplaced	
2023	Kandal	Thul Makara	1st Runner-Up Mister Supranational Cambodia 2023	Did not compete	
2022	Phnom Penh	You Thoanvannak	Appointed	Top 12	1 Special Awards: Mister Grand Sports Ambassador
Asian-based
2018	Phnom Penh	Gregory Lanuncia Dalde	Appointed	Unplaced	1 Special Awards: Mister Congeniality

=== Mister Friendship International ===
Year	Province	Mister Cambodia	National Title	Placement at Mister Friendship International	Special Awards
2023	Phnom Penh	Leav Veng Hour	Mister Friendship Cambodia 2023	Mister Friendship International 2023	2 Special Awards: Best in Swimwear; Mister Popular by Well'z Fitness
2022	Phnom Penh	Heab Seanghuy	Mister Friendship Cambodia 2022	Unplaced	1 Special Awards: 2nd Runner-Up - Best in National Costume

=== Man of the Globe International ===
Year	Province	Mister Cambodia	National Title	Placement at Man of the Globe International	Special Awards
2022	Phnom Penh	Kelvan Fox	Appointed	Man of the Globe International 2022	

=== Mister United Continents ===
Year	Province	Mister Cambodia	National Title	Placement at Mister United Continents	Special Awards
2018	Phnom Penh	Pheong Chanbomey	Appointed	Winner - Creativity: Mister United Continents Creativity 2018	1 Special Awards: Best in Theme Costume

=== Mister Glam International ===
Year	Province	Mister Cambodia	National Title	Placement at Mister Glam International	Special Awards
2023	Phnom Penh	Vibol Pich Tip	Appointed	Top 12	1 Special Awards: Best in National Costume

=== Great Man of the Universe ===
Year	Province	Mister Cambodia	National Title	Placement at Great Man of the Universe	Special Awards
2023	Phnom Penh	Bora Ret	Appointed	Unplaced	1 Special Awards: Asia-Pacific; Challenge Winner

=== Man of The Year ===
Year	Province	Mister Cambodia	National Title	Placement at Man of The Year	Special Awards
2024	Preah Sihanouk	Bong Leong	Man of The Year Cambodia 2024	TBA	TBA
2022	Phnom Penh	Tharida Un	Appointed	Unplaced	3 Special Awards: Man of the Year Personality; Man of the Year Mindful; Man of the Year Spokesperson
2019	Phnom Penh	Try Daravuth	Appointed	Top 10	1 Special Awards: Best Smile

=== Man Hot Star International ===
Year	Province	Mister Cambodia	National Title	Placement at Man Hot Star International	Special Awards
2024	Phnom Penh	Ben Kheurn	Man Hot Star Cambodia 2024	TBA	TBA

=== Mister Celebrity International ===
Year	Province	Mister Cambodia	National Title	Placement at Mister Celebrity International	Special Awards
2024	Kampot	Reang Sey	Mister Celebrity Cambodia 2024	TBA	TBA

=== Mister National Universe ===
Year	Province	Mister Cambodia	National Title	Placement at Mister National Universe	Special Awards
2024	Phnom Penh	Thea Sok Tola	Appointed	TBA	TBA

== Miss Queen Cambodia ==
=== Miss Queen Cambodia ===
Year	Miss Queen Cambodia	Miss Star Cambodia	Runners Up					Venue	Entrants
Year	Miss Queen Cambodia	Miss Star Cambodia	First Runner-Up	Second Runner-Up	Third Runner-Up	Fourth Runner-Up	Fifth Runner-Up	Venue	Entrants
2024	Ha Ni	Nean Nean Som	Sing Nong	Candy	Bonika	Sreypich	Panida	The Manny Center	17
Year	Miss Queen Cambodia		Runners Up					Venue	Entrants
Year	Miss Queen Cambodia		First Runner-Up	Second Runner-Up	Third Runner-Up	Fourth Runner-Up		Venue	Entrants
2023	Maiya		Chea Devina	Maii Davika	Slerk Cheer	Phim Phim		The Olympia Shopping Mall	13
Year	Miss Queen Cambodia		Miss Equality Cambodia		Miss Universe Trans Cambodia	Runners Up		Venue	Entrants
Year	Miss Queen Cambodia		Miss Equality Cambodia		Miss Universe Trans Cambodia	First Runner-Up	Second Runner-Up	Venue	Entrants
2022	Vann Bee		Phim Phim		Pich Kira	Jolyden	Nayong	The Olympia Shopping Mall	12
Year	Miss Queen Cambodia		Runners Up					Venue	Entrants
Year	Miss Queen Cambodia		First Runner-Up	Second Runner-Up	Third Runner-Up	Fourth Runner-Up		Venue	Entrants
2020-21	Sai Fhon		Ha Ni	Maiya	Jessie	Anna		The Olympia Shopping Mall	8

==== Winners by province ====
Provinces	Titles	Winning years
Phnom Penh	2	2020-21, 2022
Ratanakiri	1	2024
Kampong Thom	1	2023

== International pageants ==
- : Declared as Winner
- : Ended as runner-up or top 5/6 qualification
- : Ended as one of the finalists or semifinalists
- : Ended as special awards winner

=== Miss International Queen ===
Year	Province	Miss Queen Cambodia	National Title	Placement at Miss International Queen	Special Awards
2025	Ratanakiri	Ha Ni	Miss Queen Cambodia 2024	TBA	TBA
2024	Kampong Thom	Maiya	Miss Queen Cambodia 2023	TBA	TBA
2023	Phnom Penh	Vann Bee	Miss Queen Cambodia 2022	Unplaced	
2022	Phnom Penh	Sai Fhon	Miss Queen Cambodia 2020-21	Top 11	1 Special Awards: Miss Photogenic
2016	Phnom Penh	Reelawadee	Appointed	Unplaced	

=== Miss Star International ===
Year	Province	Miss Queen Cambodia	National Title	Placement at Miss Star International	Special Awards
2024	Kompot	Nean Nean Som	Miss Star Cambodia 2024	TBA	TBA

=== Miss Equality World ===
Year	Province	Miss Queen Cambodia	National Title	Placement at Miss Equality World	Special Awards
2023	Phnom Penh	Phim Phim	Miss Equality Cambodia 2022	Unplaced	1 Special Awards: Best Catwalk
2022	Phnom Penh	Hani Irina	Appointed	Unplaced	

=== Miss Universe Trans ===
Year	Province	Miss Queen Cambodia	National Title	Placement at Miss Universe Trans	Special Awards
2023	Phnom Penh	Pich Kira	Miss Universe Trans Cambodia 2022	Winner - Queen Universe Trans: Queen Universe Trans 2023	

== See also ==
- Miss Grand Cambodia
