= Blood Star =

2024 American film

- Directed by: Lawrence Jacomelli
- Written by: Victoria Taylor; Lawrence Jacomelli; George Kelly
- Produced by: Lawrence Jacomelli; Victoria Taylor; Zaina Taibi
- Starring: John Schwab; Britni Camacho; Sydney Brumfield; Travis Lincoln Cox; Felix Merback; Wyomi Reed; Brandon Brown
- Cinematography: Pascal Combes-Knoke
- Edited by: Ross Evison
- Music by: Felix Lindsell-Hales
- Production companies: Beast Video Production Company; Fastback Films; Pictures Up; Beast Los Angeles
- Distributed by: Quiver Distribution (US); Plaion (UK)
- Release dates: 9 July 2024 (NIFFF); 7 October 2024 (UK); 25 November 2025 (US)
- Running time: 97 minutes
- Countries: United States; United Kingdom
- Language: English

Blood Star is a 2024 horror thriller film directed by Lawrence Jacomelli in his feature directorial debut, from a screenplay he co-wrote with Victoria Taylor and George Kelly, based on the short story Don’t Look Back. Produced by Jacomelli, Taylor and Zaina Taibi, the film stars John Schwab, Britni Camacho, Sydney Brumfield, Travis Lincoln Cox, Felix Merback, Brandon Brown and Wyomi Reed. Blood Star follows a woman's fight for survival against a psychopathic small-town sheriff who exploits his badge to feed his violent impulses.

The film premiered at the Neuchâtel International Fantastic Film Festival in Switzerland on July 9, 2024, and had its US premiere at the Cinequest Film & Creativity Festival in February 2025. It was released in the United Kingdom on October 7, 2024, by Plaion, and was produced by Beast Productions, Fastback Films, and Beast Los Angeles. The film has also been selected for screening at various film festivals across Europe which include Grimmfest, Splat, Terror Molins, Fantasy Filmfest and the Paris International Fantastic Film Festival.

== Plot ==
At night, a girl stumbles down a desert road, pursued by a car. A man gives her a gun and one bullet. She loads the gun and aims it at the approaching vehicle, but the car smashes into her. A new day, Roberta "Bobbi" Torres drives her 1977 Ford Mustang down a desert highway when her sister Anna calls, urging her to leave her abusive boyfriend, Rhett. At a remote gas station, she encounters a sheriff who offers her a soda, which she declines. Anna calls again, comparing Rhett to their father, triggering Bobbi's anger. She speeds along the highway and is pulled over by the same sheriff, who accuses her of damaging his light-bar. He demands $300 and takes her phone. Returning to the gas station, Bobbi finds the ATM broken and her card declined. The attendant buys her a beer and warns her about the Sheriff, advising her to leave the county.

The sheriff ambushes Bobbi, shoots her car's lights and tire. He harasses her, takes her license, and demands payment. Bobbi escapes on foot after he forces her car off the road. At a diner, Bobbi steals change to call Rhett, who accuses her of having an affair with the Sheriff and hangs up. She meets a waitress, Amy, but her relief is short-lived as the Sheriff arrives, trapping her inside. She calls 911 and later her sister, but the Sheriff returns her belongings, confusing her. Amy, fired for the money Bobbi stole, is offered a ride. Suddenly, a gunshot hits Amy, and Bobbi sees the Sheriff's car approaching.

The Sheriff ultimately corners Bobbi, frames her for murder, then manipulates a truck driver who is then killed. Bobbi speeds away, her car overheats, forcing her to abandon it at a scrapyard where she attacks the simple-minded attendant, Ed. Inside, while cleaning up, she discovers a wall of driver's licenses before the Sheriff appears and confesses his crimes. As Bobbi tries to escape, Ed, the Sheriff's brother, ambushes her and knocks her unconscious. Bobbi awakens, bound and tormented by the Sheriff and Ed, learning the Sheriff is also Ed's father, a result of Ed raping his abusive mother in the past. The Sheriff rants about his mother, revealing the knife he holds is made from her jawbone before offering Bobbi a twisted chance at freedom. Refusing his game, Bobbi provokes him, leading to a brutal act of mutilation. Awakening untied, Bobbi retrieves the jawbone knife and flees.

Bobbi stumbles across the desert until she reaches a road, where the Sheriff's cruiser follows her, tracking her distance. Exhausted, she collapses, and the Sheriff records her distance before offering water and a gun with one bullet. She loads the gun, and seemingly shoots herself. The Sheriff finds no head wound, only blood from her mouth, and Bobbi stabs him with the jawbone knife and steals his cruiser. The Sheriff returns with the keys, but Bobbi unclips his holster and strikes him with a rock. She escapes in the cruiser, seeing him stand in the mirror. She turns to face him as he aims his gun. Bobbi speeds towards him. He runs out of bullets since he forgot his clip in the car as she drives into him. At the garage, she retrieves her tongue, packing it in ice for re-attachment surgery later on. Startled by Ed, she kills him with a wrecking bar. She then collects all the driver's licenses of past victims to use as evidence. When Rhett calls, she throws the phone away, finally rejecting his control, and drives towards the city lights as dawn breaks.

== Cast ==
- John Schwab as Sheriff Bilstein
- Britni Camacho as Roberta "Bobbi" Torres
- Sydney Brumfield as Amy
- Travis Lincoln Cox as Ed
- Felix Merback as Blake
- Wyomi Reed as the First Victim
- Brandon Brown as Truck Driver
- Joseph Lopez as the Diner Boss
- Eliot as Chuck

== Production ==
Blood Star is a directorial debut of Lawrence Jacomelli and was written by Victoria Taylor as her first feature film credit and also her screenwriting debut. The film was shot in 10 days with a 20-person crew. Blood Star was shot on the Red Gemini camera. The optioning was facilitated by an initial posting on Screenwriting Staffing, a platform overseen by Jacob N. Stuart.

== Release ==
Blood Star premiered at Neuchâtel International Fantastic Film Festival in Switzerland on July 9, 2024, and was released in the UK on October 7, 2024, by Plaion. It was produced by Beast Productions, Fastback Films and Beast Los Angeles. The film has also been selected at various film festivals including Grimmfest in the UK, Fantasy Filmfest in Germany, Splat!FilmFest International Fantastic Film Festival in Poland and Terror Molins Horror Film Festival in Spain. In the US, the film is distributed by Quiver Distribution and was available for streaming and on-demand viewing from November 25, 2025.

== Critical response ==
Phil Hoad, writing for The Guardian, explained that "Jacomelli has an undeniable eye for compacting a pulpy morass into snappy imagery, such as a closeup of the sheriff's loathsome kisser as he chomps chicken wings, or the neat transition between scattered scrapyard cars and a box of hijacked mobile phones." Tim Molloy from MovieMaker said that the film is "a genre film that finds time for unforgettable Tarantinoesque moments, including one in which we watch the sheriff just eat chicken." Chris Buick from UK Film Review considers Blood Star to be an "incredibly tense, dramatic, engaging and damn entertaining cat-and-mouse thriller that hardly puts a foot wrong."

Starburst editor Martin Unsworth noted the film "takes a few different paths and keeps the viewer's interest throughout, and boasts some interesting curveballs and a genuine shock moment" Prairie Miller of WBAI opined that "although torture and mayhem lace this thriller, there is likewise however ferocious, food for thought along the way." Albert Nowicki of His Name is Death praised Blood Star for its "feverish atmosphere", and called it "a solid thriller about the abuse of power and hatred towards women." He noted that the film's chase and escape sequences were "filmed with finesse, energy, and imagination."

== See also ==
- List of American films of 2025
