= Sarita Reth =

Cambodian actress and beauty pageant titleholder

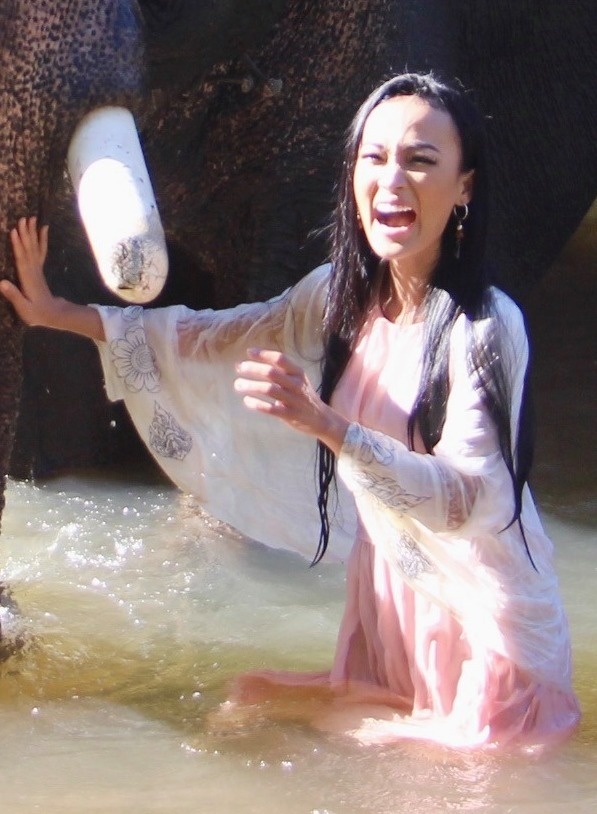
- Sarita in 2020
- Born: Sarita Reth; Phnom Penh, Cambodia
- Occupation: Actress
- Beauty pageant titleholder
- Title: Miss Universe Cambodia 2020
- Major competitions: Miss Universe Cambodia 2020] (Winner); Miss Universe 2020 (Unplaced)

Sarita Reth (Khmer: រ៉េត សារីតា) is a Cambodian actress, television host and beauty pageant titleholder. She is Khmer origin who was crowned Miss Universe Cambodia 2020. She represented Cambodia in Miss Universe 2020. As an actress, she is known for her role as Marima from Love9, a TV program that tackles sexual and reproductive health.

== Life and work ==
Sarita began her career in beauty pageants and was cast in the TV program Love9. She is known as an outspoken speaker on reproductive health among Cambodian youth. She is an ambassador for several brands in Cambodia and has been cast in several films. She starred in the 2016 Cambodian horror film Mind Cage.

== Achievements ==
Year	Category	Institution or publication	Result	Notes	Ref.
2016	Youth Champion Award	UNFPA Cambodia	Won		

Awards and achievements
Preceded by Somnang Alyna	Miss Universe Cambodia; 2020	Succeeded by Ngin Marady
