= Miss Asia Pacific International 2019 =

- Date: 9 October 2019
- Presenters: Joey Mead; Bobby Tonelli; Sam YG
- Venue: Newport Performing Arts Theater, Pasay, Metro Manila, Philippines
- Entrants: 54
- Placements: 25
- Withdrawals: Bangladesh
- Winner: Chaiyenne Huisman; Spain
- Photogenic: Jessica Victoria Cianchino, Canada

Miss Asia Pacific International 2019 was the fourth Miss Asia Pacific International pageant, held at the Newport Performing Arts Theater in Pasay, Metro Manila, Philippines, on October 9, 2019.

Sharifa Akeel of the Philippines crowned Chaiyenne Huisman of Spain at the end of the event.

== Results ==
=== Placements ===
| Placement | Contestant |
|---|---|
| Miss Asia Pacific International 2019 | Spain – Chaiyenne Huisman |
| 1st Runner-Up | Dominican Republic – Eoanna Constanza |
| 2nd Runner-Up | Canada – Jessica Victoria Cianchino |
| 3rd Runner-Up | Brazil – Carolina Schüler |
| 4th Runner-Up | Costa Rica – Fiorella Cortez Arbenz |
| Top 10 | Belgium – Lauralyn Vermeersch; Peru – Alexandra Morillo; Portugal – Jacqueline Alves; Romania – Ana Maria Ciritel; Thailand – Chunita Wongwiboonrat § |

§ People's Choice Award

== Contestants ==
Fifty-four contestants competed for the title.

| Country/Territory | Contestant | Age | Hometown |
|---|---|---|---|
| Armenia | Anahit Lazyan | 26 | Yerevan |
| Australia | Anjelica Whitelaw | 23 | Melbourne |
| Azerbaijan | Almira Salakhutdi Nova | 22 | Baku |
| Belgium | Lauralyn Vermeersch | 27 | Smetlede |
| Bolivia | Paola Andréa Perez Garcia | 26 | Santa Cruz |
| Brazil | Carolina Schüler | 25 | Florianópolis |
| Cambodia | Sothida Pokimtheng | 22 | Phnom Penh |
| Cameroon | Michèle-Ange Minkata | 23 | Yaoundé |
| Canada | Jessica Victoria Cianchino | 21 | Toronto |
| China | Chen Zhao | 21 | Gansu |
| Colombia | Alejandra Rodríguez | 23 | Cartagena |
| Costa Rica | Fiorella Cortez Arbenz | 25 | San José |
| Dominican Republic | Eoanna Constanza | 24 | Distrito Nacional |
| Egypt | Bodour Fowzy | 19 | Hurghada |
| France | Heidi Loyer | 20 | Pontorson |
| Germany | Denisse Nicolle Ligpitan | 23 | Baden-Württemberg |
| Ghana | Charlee Berbicks | 25 | Kumasi |
| Guam | Cyndal Abad | 19 | Hagåtña |
| Guatemala | Suliana Cruz Tuchez | 24 | Antigua Guatemala |
| French Guiana | Orianne Beuze | 26 | Cayenne |
| Honduras | Zully Paz | 22 | San Pedro Sula |
| Hong Kong | Hei Shun Fung | 24 | Hong Kong |
| India | Monalisa Sona | 25 | Kolkata |
| Indonesia | Santi Yuliani | 22 | Jakarta |
| Israel | Noy Ben Artzi | 22 | Tel Aviv |
| Italy | Nicole Severo | 18 | Rome |
| Japan | Emiri Yanna Shimizu | 20 | Tokyo |
| Laos | Alick Xaysomphou | 19 | Phonsavan |
| Latvia | Elena Remuar | 25 | Riga |
| Luxembourg | Maryll van Rijsingen | 23 | Benelux |
| Macau | Shen Sofía Ye | 21 | Taipa |
| Malaysia | Amanda Kristen Lee | 25 | Kuching |
| Mauritius | Queency Naigum | 23 | Port Louis |
| Mexico | Daphne Fuerte | 26 | Tijuana |
| Namibia | Ashleigh Kleintijes | 21 | Walvis Bay |
| Nepal | Pratistha Saakha | 24 | Kathmandu |
| Netherlands | Caro Boonen | 19 | Amsterdam |
| New Zealand | Chelsea Martin | 21 | Auckland |
| Nigeria | Adedoyin Abiodun | 22 | Abuja |
| Northern Cyprus | Emine Helen Keremoglu | 24 | North Nicosia |
| Panama | Cynthia Karina Lam | 19 | Taboga |
| Peru | Alexandra Morillo | 22 | Lima |
| Philippines | Klyza Castro | 19 | Davao City |
| Portugal | Jacqueline Alves | 23 | Porto |
| Romania | Ana Maria Ciritel | 23 | Bucharest |
| Russia | Uliana Yuliana Mullina | 21 | Yakutia |
| Singapore | Qiuchen Dong | 23 | Sentosa |
| Slovenia | Kaja Jokić | 27 | Ljubljana |
| South Africa | Silindokuhle Mbali Dlamini | 22 | Durban |
| South Korea | Na-yeong Kim | 24 | Jeju |
| Spain | Chaiyenne Huisman | 20 | Madrid |
| Taiwan | Ting-Yi Cheng | 25 | Taipei |
| Thailand | Chunita Wongwiboonrat | 24 | Bangkok |
| Vietnam | Nguyễn Thị Thu Hiền | 24 | Đắk Lắk |
