= Rern Sinat =

Cambodian model

- Born: Rern Sinat; 1 September 1995 (age 31); Kampong Cham, Cambodia
- Beauty pageant titleholder
- Title: Miss Cambodia 2017
- Major competitions: Miss Cambodia 2017 (Winner); Miss Universe 2018 (Unplaced)

Rern Sinat (Khmer: រឿន ស៊ីណាត; born 1 September 1995) is a Cambodian beauty pageant titleholder who won the Miss Cambodia 2017 on 1 September 2017 in Kampong Cham, Cambodia. She is the second Miss Cambodia to compete for the title of Miss Universe in history.

== Personal life ==
Sinat lives in Kampong Cham. She previously worked as a DJ on ABC Cambodia. In 2017, Sinat won Miss Cambodia 2017 and represented her country at the Miss Universe 2018. As Miss Cambodia she is involved in corporate social responsibility initiatives, including tree planting and a football clinic.

== Pageantry ==
=== Miss Cambodia 2017 ===
Sinat was crowned Miss Cambodia 2017 on 1 September 2017 at the Grand Ballroom of Hotel Naga World. She was crowned together with runners-up, Keo Senglyhour, Kem Sreykeo, Long Punleu and Kha Annchhany.

=== Miss Universe 2018 ===
Sinat represented Cambodia in Miss Universe 2018 placed at top 94.

== Filmography ==
Year	Title	Role	Ref.
2024	Z-Mom	The Mother	

Awards and achievements
Preceded by Sotheary By	Miss Cambodia; 2017	Succeeded by Somnang Alyna
