= Somnang Alyna =

Cambodian beauty pageant titleholder

- Born: Phnom Penh, Cambodia
- Education: Pannasastra University
- Beauty pageant titleholder
- Title: Miss Universe Cambodia 2019; Miss International Cambodia 2023
- Major competitions: World Miss University Cambodia 2017 (1st runner-up); World Miss University 2017 (Top16); Miss Universe Cambodia 2019 (Winner); Miss Universe 2019 (Unplaced); Miss International 2023 (Top 16)

Somnang Alyna (Khmer: សំណាង អេលីណា) is a Cambodian beauty pageant titleholder who won Miss Universe Cambodia 2019 and represented Cambodia at Miss Universe 2019. she also represented Cambodia at the Miss International 2023.She was Unplaced but ranked 16th

== Personal life ==
Alyna is a first year student at the Pannasastra University of Cambodia, majoring in International Relations.

== Pageantry ==
=== World Miss University 2017 ===
She represented Cambodia at the World Miss University 2017, where she was placed as the First Runner up.

=== Miss Universe Cambodia 2019 ===
Alyna first applied in 2018 along with 24 other candidates. She competed against 24 other candidates and won Miss Universe Cambodia 2019.

=== Miss Universe 2019 ===
Alyna represented Cambodia at Miss Universe 2019.

=== Miss International 2023 ===
Alyna was appointed as the representative of Cambodia at Miss International 2023. She was unplaced in the top 15. A few days later Miss International announced the top 20 list and Alyna was in the 16th place. She was also top seventh in the best National Costume.

Awards and achievements
Preceded by Rern Sinat	Miss Universe Cambodia; 2019	Succeeded by Sarita Reth
Preceded by Chea Charany	Miss International Cambodia; 2023	Succeeded by Chanraksmey Loy
