= Miss Grand Cambodia =

National beauty contest in Cambodia

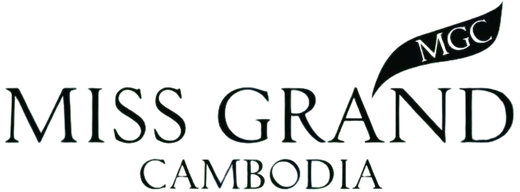
- Established: 27 July 2015; 11 years ago
- Founder: Boonkerd Ang-amnuaysiri
- Type: Beauty pageant
- Headquarters: Phnom Penh
- Location: Cambodia
- Members: Miss Grand International
- Official language: Khmer
- Parent organization: BKA Entertainment (2014 – 2019); Mohahang Production (2020–2022); HK7 Co., Ltd. (2023–2024)

Miss Grand Cambodia (Khmer: បវរកញ្ញាឯកដ៏អស្ចារ្យនៃកម្ពុជា) is an annual female beauty pageant in Cambodia, founded in 2015 by BKA Entertainment chaired by a Thai businessperson in Cambodia Boonkerd Ang-amnuaysiri (บุญเกิด อังอำนวยศิริ), the finalists of the contest have been sent to participate in various international contests including its parent stage, Miss Grand International. In 2020, The pageant patent was transferred to a Phnom Penh-based event organizer managed by Sophin In, Mohahang Production, and then to a cosmetics and dietary supplement retailer, HK 7 Co., Ltd., headed by Sokunthea Im, Sarapich Som and Sokpoly Voeun in 2023.

During 2015-2019, the competition was aired on MYTV, but later changed to the Royal Cambodian Armed Forces Television (TV5) after Mohahang Production had acquired the license in 2020.

Since the establishment of Miss Grand International, to date, Cambodian representatives have never won the contest. However, three placements was recorded in 2020, 2021 and 2022, when Chily Tevy, Sothida Pokimtheng and Pich Votey Saravody were placed among the Top 20 and Top 10 finalists, respectively.

In 2024, Miss Grand Cambodia shut down after a dispute with the international organization, with claims that MGI did not show proper respect to the Cambodia during the conflict.

== Background ==
=== History ===
After the first participation at Miss Grand International by the appointed representative Tim Srey Niet in 2014, the Cambodian licensee subsequently ran its first competition in the following year. The contest was held at Nagaworld Hotel Grand Ballroom, which functioned as the final venue of the Miss Grand Cambodia pageant from 2015 – 2019, featuring 24 national finalists directly chosen by the national organizer, of which, a 22 years-old third-year medical student Seng Polvithavy was announced the winner, and the pageant was held annually since then.

BKA Entertainment lost the contest license to Mohahang Production in 2020, after failing to send the 2019 titleholder, Det Sreyneat, to participate at Miss Grand International 2019 in Venezuela, as a result of insufficient time to prepare the documents for the visa application; the winner was crowned on late September, but the international pageant was launched on early October. Such an incident also happened in 2016.

Under the management of Mohahang Production, the pageant result was canceled in 2020, when the original winner, Seng Rotha, opted not to compete in the international pageant and renounced the title. Furthermore, the first runner-up, Lim Sotheavy, also refused to take over the title due to the health conditions, which causes the organizer to file a lawsuit against them for not fulfilling the agreement, and subsequently appointed Chily Tevy, the second runner-up, to join the international pageant instead.

From 2023 to 2024, the competition license belonged to a cosmetics company, HK7 Co., Ltd., with Sokunthea Im as the director.

=== Selection of contestants ===
Under the management of BKA Entertainment, the national aspirants for its first five editions were directly chosen by the central organizer based in Phnom Penh. However, after the pageant license was transferred to another organizer, Mohahang Production, in 2020, an attempt to distribute to the provincial organs has been observed ever since. Moreover, Cambodian overseas, such as Khmer Krom, Khmer Loeu, French-Cambodians, etc., have been allowed to participate in the contest with independent sash title since 2020, nevertheless, most of the candidates were still directly selected and appointed the provincial titles by the national organizer due to a lacking of regional licensees.

In 2024, provincial competitions were created to select the representatives of Kampong Cham, Kampong Chhnang, Phnom Penh, Ratanakiri, and Siem Reap to the Miss Grand Cambodia national competition.

== Editions ==
=== Date and venue ===
The following list is the edition detail of the Miss Grand Cambodia contest, since its inception in 2015.

Year	Edition	Date	Final venue	Host Province	Entrants	Ref.
2015	1st	27 July	Nagaworld Hotel Grand Ballroom	Phnom Penh	24	
2016	2nd	30 June	Nagaworld Hotel Grand Ballroom	Phnom Penh	23	
2017	3rd	17 August	Nagaworld Hotel Grand Ballroom	Phnom Penh	18	
2018	4th	13 September	Nagaworld Hotel Grand Ballroom	Phnom Penh	27	
2019	5th	19 September	Nagaworld Hotel Grand Ballroom	Phnom Penh	29	
2020	6th	26 September	The Premier Center Sen Sok	Phnom Penh	28	
2021	7th	10 October	AEON Mall, Sen Sok City	Phnom Penh	25	
2022	8th	27 August	The Union of Youth Federations of Cambodia	Phnom Penh	35	
2023	9th	19 August	Koh Pich Theater	Phnom Penh	25	
2024	10th	12 July	Koh Pich Theater	Phnom Penh	28	

=== Ancillary activities ===
The pageant ancillary activities are usually consisted of three main subevents namely the best in swimsuit competition, preliminary competition as well as the national costume parade, which is considered as one of the most popular events.

Special award winners

Edition
2020
2021
2022
2023
2024

Best in Swimsuit	Best National Costume	Best Evening Gown	Miss Popular Vote	Miss Rising Star	Miss Photogenic	Best Introduction	Best Makeup	Miss Personality
Banteay Meanchey	Preah Sihanouk	Preah Sihanouk	Kandal	—N/a	—N/a	Tboung Khmum	—N/a	—N/a
Kampong Cham	Preah Sihanouk	Kampot	Takéo	Preah Vihear	—N/a	Kratié	Koh Kong	Kampong Thom ^{[a]}
Cambodian Canadians	Mondulkiri	Cambodian Vietnamese	Cambodian Vietnamese	Kampong Thom	Cambodian Vietnamese	Mondulkiri	Preah Sihanouk	Bokor ^{[a]}
Pailin	Phnom Penh	Kampong Thom	Battambang	—N/a	Kratié	Tboung Khmum	Pailin	Stung Treng
Kampong Chhnang	Siem Reap	Stung Treng	Stung Treng	—N/a	Stung Treng	Takéo	Siem Reap	Kandal

Notes
1. ^{1} ^{2} The Miss Personality award was known as Miss Charming from 2020 to 2022.

=== Competition results ===
Year	Editions	Miss Grand Cambodia	Runners Up			
Year	Editions	Miss Grand Cambodia	First	Second	Third	Fourth
2024	10th	Sotheary Bee; Kampong Chhnang	Sreyneth Ry; Svay Rieng	Panhavimealea Dy; Siem Reap	Davy Mach; Ratanakiri	Phattiya Phou; Battambang
2023	9th	Sreynor Phem; Phnom Penh	Anna Koy; Kratié	Leakhena In; Pailin	Sreynit Sou; Kampong Thom	Nongnith Men; Preah Sihanouk
2022	8th	Saravody Pich Votey; Preah Sihanouk	Soriyan Hang; Cambodian Vietnamese	Naly Lim; Battambang	Sreylin Keo; Ratanakiri	Thavary Pheab; Cambodian Thais
2021	7th	Sothida Pokimtheng; Battambang	Leakhena In; Kampong Cham	Em Kunthong; Preah Sihanouk	Keo Senglyhour; Kampot	Sok Ratcharakorn; Kampong Chhnang
2020	6th	Seng Rotha (Resigned); Kampong Thom Chily Tevy (Successor); Banteay Meanchey	Lim Sotheavy (Resigned); Preah Sihanouk Vuth Thidavin (Successor); Battambang	Chily Tevy (Resigned); Banteay Meanchey Sarom Chantha (Successor); Cambodian French	Vuth Thidavin (Resigned); Battambang Morm Rany (Successor); Kandal	Sarom Chantha (Resigned); Cambodian French Khat Sreychan (Successor); Kampong Chhnang
2019	5th	Det Sreyneat; Phnom Penh	San Sievling; Tboung Khmum	Touch Meangleang; Prey Veng	Not awarded	
2018	4th	Lika Dy; Kampong Cham	Dy Sorakheta; Phnom Penh	Lim Sophalidet; Kandal	Sarith Lyka; Phnom Penh	Chhom Phally; Phnom Penh
2017	3rd	Khloem Sreykea; Phnom Penh	Nhert Sophea; Phnom Penh	Mony Monyta; Phnom Penh	John Sotima; Tboung Khmum	Not awarded
2016	2nd	Heng Chantha; Phnom Penh	Bun Leakhena; Phnom Penh	Chea Gekheang; Kandal	Song Chev Vicheka; Phnom Penh	Chev Thavary; Phnom Penh
2015	1st	Seng Polvithavy; Phnom Penh	Kim Katiyak Kanha; Phnom Penh	Srey Sathyaphoung; Phnom Penh	Not awarded	

5th Runner-Up

Since 2024, Miss Grand Cambodia pageant has awarded a Top 11 finalists as 5th Runner-Up. This table lists the name of 5th Runner-Up titles by year.

Year	Editions	List of 5th runners-up					
2024	10th	Sreypi Phorn; Kampong Cham	Kunthea Thy; Kampot	Socheata Kong; Oddar Meanchey	Thida Pov; Preah Sihanouk	Lida Sin; Stung Treng	Sovannrothana Morn; Takéo

=== Winners by province ===
Provinces	Titles	Winning years
Phnom Penh	5	2015, 2016, 2017, 2019, 2023
Kampong Chhnang	1	2024
Preah Sihanouk	1	2022
Battambang	1	2021
Banteay Meanchey	1	2020*
Kampong Thom	1	2020
Kampong Cham	1	2018

=== Winner gallery ===
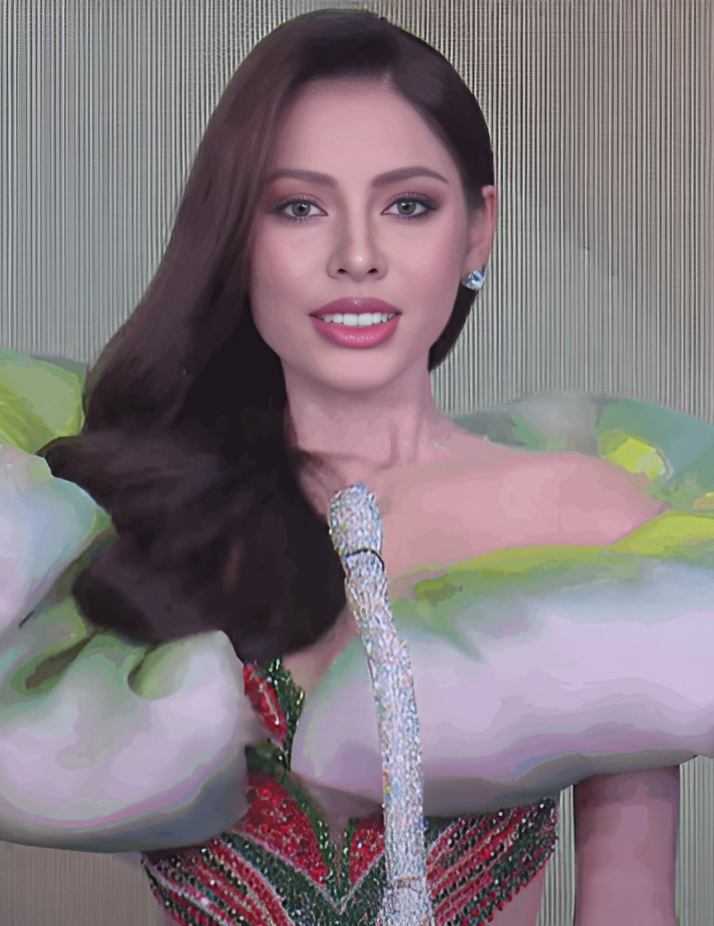
Sotheary Bee (2024)

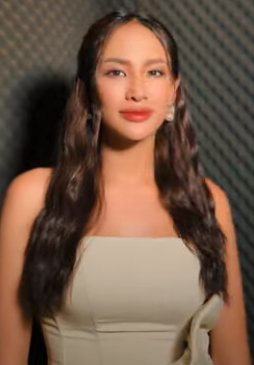
Phoem Sreynor (2023)

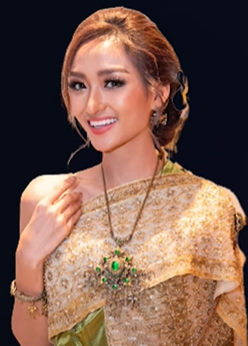
Saravady Pich Votey (2022)

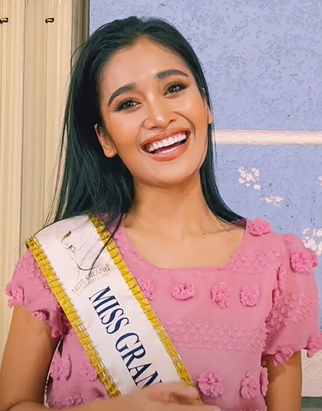
Sothida Pokimtheng (2021)

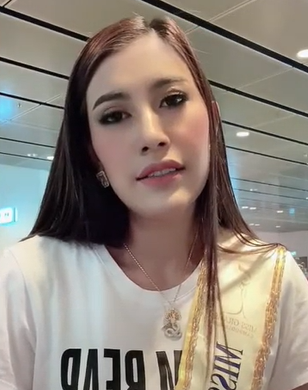
Chily Tevy (2020)

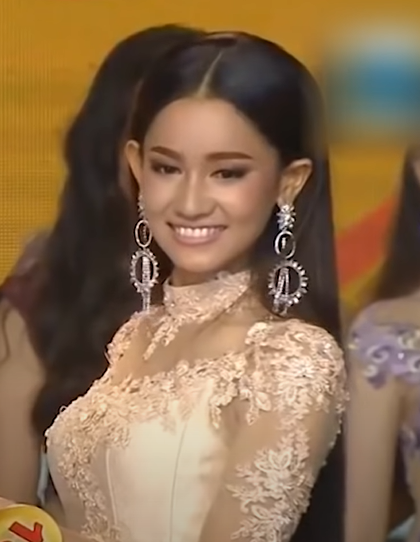
Lika Dy (2018)

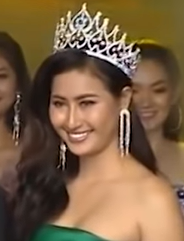
Khloem Sreykea (2017)

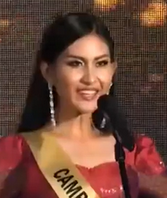
Seng Polvithavy (2015)

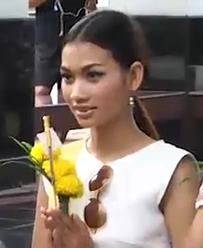
Tim Srey Niet (2014)

== International competition ==
The main finalists of the Miss Grand Cambodia pageant have been sent to represent the country in various international contests, the following is a list of international contests, with participants from Miss Grand Cambodia as contestants based on the year the pageant was held. Thai Duong Limousine Cambodia

Colors key

- Declared as the winner
- Ended as a runner-up (Top 5)
- Ended as a finalist (Top 10/13/15/16)
- Ended as a semi-finalist (Top 20/21/25/30)
- Unplaced

=== Miss Grand International ===
Year	Representative	Original national title	Competition performance		National director	Ref.
Year	Representative	Original national title	Placements	Other award	National director	Ref.
No representatives since 2025
2024	Sotheary Bee	Miss Grand Cambodia 2024	Withdrew		Sokunthea Im	
2023	Phem Sreynor	Miss Grand Cambodia 2023	Unplaced		Sokunthea Im	
2022	Pich Votey Saravody	Miss Grand Cambodia 2022	5th runner up(Dethroned)		Sophin In	
2021	Pokimtheng Sothida	Miss Grand Cambodia 2021	Top 10	Miss Popular Vote	Sophin In	
2020	Chily Tevy	Miss Grand Cambodia 2020	Top 20	Country of the Year	Sophin In	
2019	Det Sreyneat	Miss Grand Cambodia 2019	Withdrew		Boonkerd Angamnuaysiri	
2018	Lika Dy	Miss Grand Cambodia 2018	Unplaced		Boonkerd Angamnuaysiri	
2017	Khloem Sreykea	Miss Grand Cambodia 2017	Unplaced		Boonkerd Angamnuaysiri	
2016	Heng Chantha	Miss Grand Cambodia 2016	Withdrew		Boonkerd Angamnuaysiri	
2015	Seng Polvithavy	Miss Grand Cambodia 2015	Unplaced		Boonkerd Angamnuaysiri	
2014	Nou Tim Srey Niet	Appointed	Unplaced	Miss Popular Vote	Boonkerd Angamnuaysiri	
2013	Chan Srey Neang	Appointed	Withdrew		Chan Srey Neang	

=== Other international pageants ===
Year	Contestant	Original national title	International competition		National director	Ref.
Year	Contestant	Original national title	Pageant	Result	National director	Ref.
2024	Phorn Srey Pii	5th runner-up Miss Grand Cambodia 2024	Miss Intercontinental 2024	Top 22	Sokunthea Im	
2024	Leakena In	2nd runner-up Miss Grand Cambodia 2023	Miss Cosmo 2024	Top 10	Sokunthea Im	
2022	Leakena In	1st runner-up Miss Grand Cambodia 2021	Miss Supranational 2022	Unplaced	Sophin In	
2022	Em Kunthong	2nd runner-up Miss Grand Cambodia 2021	Miss Global 2022	Unplaced	Sophin In	
2017	Nheat Sophea	1st runner-up Miss Grand Cambodia 2017	Miss International 2017	Unplaced	Boonkerd Angamnuaysiri	

== National finalists ==
The following list is the national finalists of the Miss Grand Cambodia pageant, as well as the competition results.

Color keys
W Declared as the winner
Ended as a runner-up
Ended as a semi-finalist
Ended as a quarterfinalist
– Did not participate

=== 2015–2019: No provincial title ===
Miss Grand Cambodia National Finalists 1st & 5th Editions (2015–2019)
Year No.	2015	2016	2017	2018	2019
01	Dek Sokhemarty	Kong Thidapich			Chhorn Sokunthea
02	Yet Nissay				Sam Makara
03	Srey Sathyaphoung				Sear Socheata
04	Kim Katiyak Kanha		John Sotima		Doeun Panhavuttey
05				Sarith Lyka	Brak Sophanmai
06			Soth Mary		Sok Khim
07		Hong Chihoun	Nhert Sophea	Chhom Phally	Pun Povkropompor
08			Mony Monyta		Hor Chhngbgheam
09		Sothida Pokimtheng	Suong Srino		Vay Dany
10		Chev Thavory	Haing Kim Suon		Vanna Nisa
11		Dyna	Khloem Sreykea (W)		Sann Kesey
12					Phally Phangarey
13		Yom Sreybi			Thou Youeang
14					Siek Chievmey
15		Vanna Bounmy		Lika Dy (W)	Mok Vannas
16		Phay Ravy			Chong Limeng
17		Boren Chhouen			Seb Sithyka
18		Dara Rachana		Dy Sorakheta	Touch Mengleang
19		Neou Sreyleng	—		Moeun Sokunthea
20		Bun Leakhena	—		Nop Pov
21		Chea Gechheang	—		Leng Chantha
22	Seng Polvithavy (W)	Heng Chantha (W)	—		VyKosa
23		Yom Sreybi	—		Det Sreyneat (W)
24			—		San Siveling
25		Song SavVichheka	—	Kong Sokha	Phang Dalin
26	—	—	—		Kheang Maryneth
27	—	—	—	Lim Sophalidet	Try Sreyleng
28	—	—	—	—	Ny Sreypich
29	—	—	—	—	Kim Leakna
รวม	25	25	18	27	29

=== 2020–2024: Provincial representatives ===
Miss Grand Cambodia National Finalists 6th to 10th Editions (2020–2024)
Year Capitals, Provinces & Cities, etc.	2020	2021	2022	2023	2024
Banteay Meanchey	Liv Chily (Successor)	Eam Phaya	Sophin Phon	Chenda Vat	Sokparkpitt Chap
Battambang	Vuth Thidavin (Successor)	Pokimtheng Sothida (W)	Naly Lim	Kosin Heng	Phattiya Phou
Bavet	—	—	Sreyley Phon	—	—
Bokor	—	—	Sotheara Kong	—	—
Cambodian communities in Australia	Ngim Sreylis	—	Serey Ke	—	—
Cambodian communities in Canada	—	—	Sithay Srean	—	—
Cambodian communities in France	Sarom Chantha	—	Sereyroth Sam	—	—
Cambodian communities in New Zealand	—	—	Sreymao Ly	—	—
Cambodian communities in Thailand	—	—	Thavary Pheab	—	—
Cambodian communities in United States	Man Sreymom	—	Sreylis Seang	—	—
Cambodian communities in Vietnam	—	—	Soriyan Hang	—	—
Kampong Cham	Lim Danin	In Leakhena	Ka Ny	Kunthea Thy	Sreypi Phorn
Kampong Chhnang	Khat Sreychan	Sok Ratcharakorn	Vicheka Sa	Sreynun Phat	Sotheary By (W)
Kampong Speu	Mok Vannak	Leng Chantha	Sopheap Souern	Vorleak Touch	Chhuny Mao
Kampong Thom	Seng Rotha (Resigned)	Ol Rina	Naisim Ly	Sreynit Sou	Lyla Ny
Kampot	Phang Dalin	Keo Senglyhour	Kanika John	Sreymey Som	Kunthea Thy
Kandal	Morn Rany	Vat Chenda	Lisa Pov	Davy Ou	Savy Chhouk
Kep	Hor Chhenghim	Chhum Mengly	Lanin Rin	Kesey Sann	Sreydeth Don
Koh Kong	Vannak Dalin	Phem Sreynor	Lyly Ngo	Nika Inthong Kong	Ritheany Khoeunkunthy
Kratié	Chor Suorsdey	Lim Danin	Lychang Seng	Anna Koy	Ratana Sok
Mondulkiri	Chhin Sreynit	Nhem Srey Tey	Lymey Chao Sokhom	Somonea Morokoth Rithy	Sopheak En
Oddar Meanchey	Reach Chanpisey	Thon Panha	Bopha So	Aliza Len	Socheata Kong
Pailin	Than Thary Rothana	Lim Naly	Elen Kit	Leakhena In	Khim Sok
Phnom Penh	Chin Sonita	Sam Sereyroth	Chetravatey Hout	Sreynor Phem (W)	Lima Chan
Poipet	—	—	Sreypov Yi	—	Dalin Ny
Preah Vihear	Lun Kimheng	Va Malina	Pisey Channa	Bounsakh Rangsey Maw	Seakliv Kreoung
Prey Veng	Soun Pisey	Pok Sreyleak	Sreylin Phin	Sreydet Don	Nika Kol
Pursat	Sann Kesey	Yun Navy	Sreyley Lon	Kimsour Ey	Lyhour Sreng
Ratanakiri	Yoeun Soriya	Chhuon Malen	Sreylin Keo	Sokleng Phoem	Davy Mach
Siem Reap	Uch Sokundavy	Bee Za	Phattiya Phou	Kanika John	Panhavimealea Dy
Preah Sihanouk	Lim Sotheavy(Resigned)	Em Kun Thong	Saravady Pich Votey (W)	Nongnith Men	Thida Pov
Stung Treng	Silim Sokunnita	Som Vayyey	Chanla Chheang	Sophan Mov	Lida Sin
Suong	—	—	—	—	Ratanakphoung Phun
Svay Rieng	Khat Krorpumchhouk	Yeang Sonita	Sreynu Eeang	Lina Por	Sreynet Rey
Takéo	Savoun Kanha	Phou Phattiya	Sreynuch Eang	Kaknika Heng	Sovannrothana Morn
Ta Khmau	—	—	—	—	Phaya Eam
Tboung Khmum	Sal Chandalin	Srean Sithay	Sokundavy Uch	Leakhena Bun	Sreylin Sitha
Total	28	25	35	25	28
