= Miss Grand Phnom Penh =

Provincial pageant in Phnom Penh, Cambodia

Miss Grand ฺPhnom Penh
- Formation: February 2, 2024; 2 years ago
- Founder: Sokun Linna
- Type: Beauty pageant
- Headquarters: Phnom Penh
- Location: Cambodia
- Official language: Khmer
- Director: Sokun Linna (2024)
- Affiliations: Miss Grand Cambodia

Summary result of Phnom Penh representatives at Miss Grand Cambodia
Placement	Number(s)
Winner	1
1st runner-up	0
2nd runner-up	0
3rd runner-up	0
4th runner-up	0
Top 10/11/12	1
Top 15/16	1
Unplaced	3

Miss Grand Phnom Penh is a Cambodian provincial beauty pageant which selects a representative from Phnom Penh to the Miss Grand Cambodia national competition. It was founded in 2024 by an entrepreneur Sokun Linna (សុគន្ធ លីនណា).

Phnom Penh produced one Miss Grand Cambodia winner; in 2023, won by an appointed Sreynor Phem.

== History ==
Phnom Penh has participated in the Miss Grand Cambodia pageant since 2020. However, all 2020 – 2023 representatives were appointed by the national organizer. After HK7 Co., Ltd. led by Sokunthea Im acquired the license and franchised the provincial competitions to local organizers in 2024, the franchise for the capital, Phnom Penh, was granted to an entrepreneur Sokun Linna. Linna organized the first Miss Grand Phnom Penh in Sen Sok on 2 February 2024 and named a television personality, Kaychan Preah, the winner.

Winner gallery

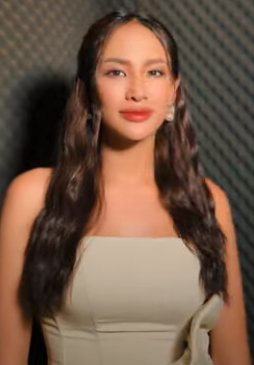
Phoem Sreyno,
Miss Grand Phnom Penh 2023

== Edition ==
The following table details Miss Grand Phnom Penh's annual edition which was organized once in 2024.

Edition	Date	Final venue	Entrants	Winner	Ref.
1st	February 2, 2024	Aeon Mall Sen Sok, Phnom Penh	14	Kaychan Preah (Note: Later resigned, and the runner-up, Sereyroth Limchan, was elected as the replacement.)	

== National competition ==
The following is a list of Phnom Penh representatives who competed at the Miss Grand Cambodia pageant.

Year	Representative		Original provincial title	Placement at Miss Grand Cambodia	Provincial director	Ref.
Year	Romanized name	Khmer name	Original provincial title	Placement at Miss Grand Cambodia	Provincial director	Ref.
2020	Chin Sonita		Appointed by the national organizer	Unplaced	Appointed by the national organizer	
2021	Sam Sereyroth		Appointed by the national organizer	Unplaced	Appointed by the national organizer	
2022	Chetravatey Hout		Appointed by the national organizer	Unplaced	Appointed by the national organizer	
2023	Phoem Sreynor	ភឹម ស្រីនោ	Appointed by the national organizer	Winner	Appointed by the national organizer	
2024	Sereyroth Limchan	លឹម ចាន់សិរីរ័ត្ន	1st runner-up Miss Grand Phnom Penh 2024	Top 16	Sokun Linna	
