= Miss Grand Kampong Chhnang =

Provincial pageant in Kampong Chhnang, Cambodia

Miss Grand ฺKampong Chhnang
- Formation: February 10, 2024; 2 years ago
- Founder: Khat Sreychan
- Type: Beauty pageant
- Headquarters: Phnom Penh
- Location: Cambodia
- Official language: Khmer
- Director: Khat Sreychan (2024)
- Affiliations: Miss Grand Cambodia

Summary result of Kampong Chhnang representatives at Miss Grand Cambodia
| Placement | Number(s) |
|---|---|
| Winner | 1 |
| 1st runner-up | 0 |
| 2nd runner-up | 0 |
| 3rd runner-up | 0 |
| 4th runner-up | 1 |
| Top 10/11/12 | 1 |
| Top 15/16 | 0 |
| Unplaced | 2 |

Miss Grand Kampong Chhnang is a Cambodian provincial beauty pageant which selects a representative from Kampong Chhnang to the Miss Grand Cambodia national competition. It was founded in 2024 by an entrepreneur Khat Sreychan (ខាត់ ស្រីចាន់).

Kampong Chhnang representative won the Miss Grand Cambodia once in 2024; by former Miss Universe Cambodia Sotheary Bee. Another highlight placement was the fourth runner-up position, achieved by an appointed Sok Ratcharakorn in 2021.

== History ==
Kampong Chhnang has participated in the Miss Grand Cambodia pageant since 2020. However, all 2020 – 2023 representatives were appointed by the national organizer. After HK7 Co., Ltd. led by Sokunthea Im acquired the license and franchised the provincial competitions to local organizers in 2024, the franchise for Kampong Chhnang province was granted to an entrepreneur Khat Sreychan.

Sreychan organized the first Miss Grand Kampong Chhnang in Phnom Penh on 10 February 2024 and named former Miss Universe Cambodia 2017, Panhavimealea Dy, the winner. Panhavimealea later represented the province in the 2024 national competition and won the title.

Winner gallery

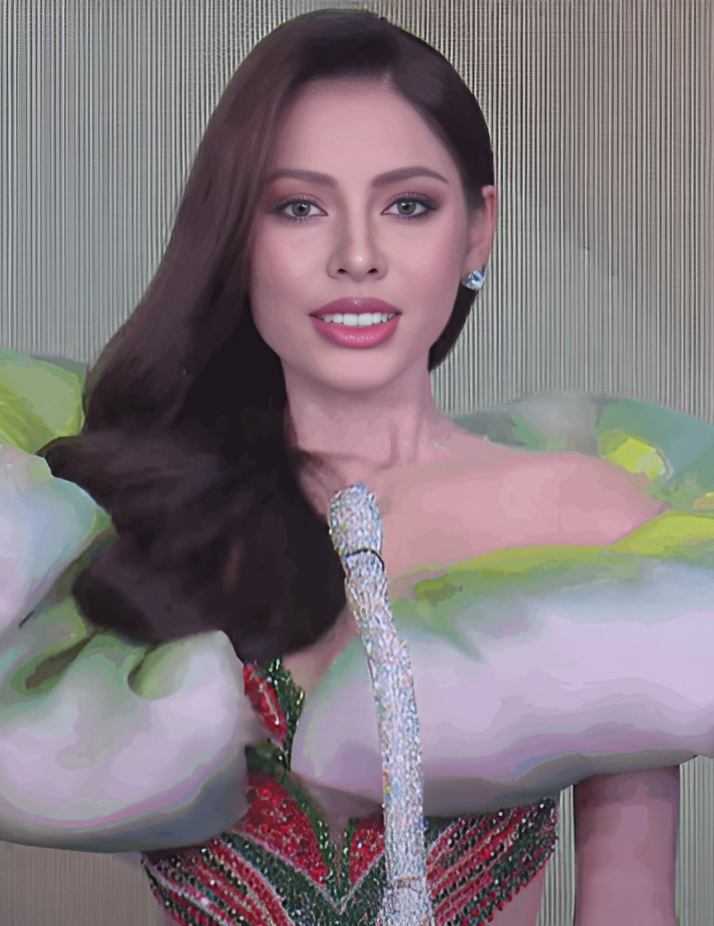
Sotheary Bee (2024)

== Edition ==
The following table details Miss Grand Kampong Chhnang's annual edition which was organized once in 2024.

| Edition | Date | Final venue | Entrants | Winner | Ref. |
|---|---|---|---|---|---|
| 1st | January 10, 2024 | Aeon Mall Sen Sok, Phnom Penh | 13 | Sotheary Bee | |

== National competition ==
The following is a list of Kampong Chhnang representatives who competed at the Miss Grand Cambodia pageant.

| Year | Representative | | Original provincial title | Placement at Miss Grand Cambodia | Provincial director | Ref. |
| Year | Romanized name | Khmer name | Original provincial title | Placement at Miss Grand Cambodia | Provincial director | Ref. |
|---|---|---|---|---|---|---|
| 2020 | Khat Sreychan | ខាត់ ស្រីចាន់ | Appointed by the national organizer | Top 10 (Note: Later promoted to the 4th runner-up after the winner and 1st runner-up resigned from the titles.) | Appointed by the national organizer | |
| 2021 | Sok Ratcharakorn | | Appointed by the national organizer | 4th runner-up | Appointed by the national organizer | |
| 2022 | Vicheka Sa | | Appointed by the national organizer | Unplaced | Appointed by the national organizer | |
| 2023 | Sreynun Phat | ផាត ស្រីនុន | Appointed by the national organizer | Unplaced | Appointed by the national organizer | |
| 2024 | Sotheary Bee | ប៊ី សុធារី | Miss Grand Kampong Chhnang 2024 | Winner | Khat Sreychan | |
