= Miss Grand Siem Reap =

Provincial pageant in Siem Reap, Cambodia

Miss Grand ฺSiem Reap
- Formation: January 25, 2024; 2 years ago
- Founder: Angie Ly
- Type: Beauty pageant
- Headquarters: Phnom Penh
- Location: Cambodia
- Official language: Khmer
- Director: Angie Ly (2024)
- Affiliations: Miss Grand Cambodia

Summary result of Siem Reap representatives at Miss Grand Cambodia
Placement	Number(s)
Winner	0
1st runner-up	0
2nd runner-up	1
3rd runner-up	0
4th runner-up	0
Top 10/11/12	1
Top 15/16	1
Unplaced	2

Miss Grand Siem Reap is a Cambodian provincial beauty pageant which selects a representative from Siem Reap to the Miss Grand Cambodia national competition. It was founded in 2024 by an entrepreneur Angie Ly (អេនជី លី).

Siem Reap representatives have not yet won the Miss Grand Cambodia title. The highest placement they obtained was the second runner-up position, achieved by Panhavimealea Dy in 2024.

== History ==
Siem Reap has participated in the Miss Grand Cambodia pageant since 2020. However, all 2020 – 2023 representatives were appointed by the national organizer. After HK7 Co., Ltd. led by Sokunthea Im acquired the license and franchised the provincial competitions to local organizers in 2024, the franchise for Siem Reap province was granted to an entrepreneur Angie Ly.

Angie organized the first Miss Grand Siem Reap in Phnom Penh on 25 January 2024 and named a television personality, Panhavimealea Dy, the winner. Panhavimealea later represented the province in the 2024 national competition and finished as the second runner-up.

== Edition ==
The following table details Miss Grand Siem Reap's annual edition which was organized once in 2024.

Edition	Date	Final venue	Entrants	Winner	Ref.
1st	January 25, 2024	Aeon Mall Sen Sok, Phnom Penh	15	Panhavimealea Dy	

== National competition ==
The following is a list of Siem Reap representatives who competed at the Miss Grand Cambodia pageant.

Year	Representative		Original provincial title	Placement at Miss Grand Cambodia	Provincial director	Ref.
Year	Romanized name	Khmer name	Original provincial title	Placement at Miss Grand Cambodia	Provincial director	Ref.
2020	Uch Sokundavy		Appointed by the national organizer	Unplaced	Appointed by the national organizer	
2021	Bee Za		Appointed by the national organizer	Unplaced	Appointed by the national organizer	
2022	Phattiya Phou		Appointed by the national organizer	Top 15	Appointed by the national organizer	
2023	Kanika John	ចន កានីកា	Appointed by the national organizer	Top 10	Appointed by the national organizer	
2024	Panhavimealea Dy	ឌី បញ្ញាវិមាលា	Miss Grand Siem Reap 2024	2nd runner-up	Angie Ly	
