= Miss Grand Ratanakiri =

Provincial pageant in Ratanakiri, Cambodia

Miss Grand ฺRatanakiri
- Formation: February 28, 2024; 2 years ago
- Founder: Phong Vanna
- Type: Beauty pageant
- Headquarters: Phnom Penh
- Location: Cambodia
- Official language: Khmer
- Director: Phong Vanna (2024)
- Affiliations: Miss Grand Cambodia

Summary result of Ratanakiri representatives at Miss Grand Cambodia
Placement	Number(s)
Winner	0
1st runner-up	0
2nd runner-up	0
3rd runner-up	2
4th runner-up	0
Top 10/11/12	0
Top 15/16	0
Unplaced	3

Miss Grand Ratanakiri is a Cambodian provincial beauty pageant which selects a representative from Ratanakiri province to the Miss Grand Cambodia national competition. It was founded in 2024 by an entrepreneur Phong Vanna (ផួង វណ្ណា, also known as Ab Vanna).

Ratanakiri representatives have not yet won the Miss Grand Cambodia title. The highest placement they obtained was the third runner-up, achieved by Sreylin Keo in 2022 and Davy Mach in 2024.

== History ==
Ratanakiri has participated in the Miss Grand Cambodia pageant since 2020. However, all 2020 – 2023 representatives were appointed by the national organizer. After HK7 Co., Ltd. led by Sokunthea Im acquired the license and franchised the provincial competitions to local organizers in 2024, the franchise for Ratanakiri province was granted to the Ab Studio Sihanoukville led by Phong Vanna.

Vanna organized the first Miss Grand Ratanakiri in Phnom Penh on 28 February 2024 and named Davy Mach the winner. Davy later represented the province in the 2024 national competition and was placed the third runner-up.

== Edition ==
The following table details Miss Grand Ratanakiri's annual edition which was organized once in 2024.

Edition	Date	Final venue	Entrants	Winner	Ref.
1st	February 28, 2024	Aeon Mall Sen Sok, Phnom Penh	13	Davy Mach	

== National competition ==
The following is a list of Ratanakiri representatives who competed at the Miss Grand Cambodia pageant.

Year	Representative		Original provincial title	Placement at Miss Grand Cambodia	Provincial director	Ref.
Year	Romanized name	Khmer name	Original provincial title	Placement at Miss Grand Cambodia	Provincial director	Ref.
2020	Yoeun Soriya		Appointed by the national organizer	Unplaced	Appointed by the national organizer	
2021	Chhuon Malen		Appointed by the national organizer	Unplaced	Appointed by the national organizer	
2022	Sreylin Keo		Appointed by the national organizer	3rd runner-up	Appointed by the national organizer	
2023	Sokleng Phoem	ភឹម សុខឡេង	Appointed by the national organizer	Unplaced	Appointed by the national organizer	
2024	Davy Mach	ម៉ាច ដាវី	Miss Grand Ratanakiri 2024	3rd runner-up	Khat Sreychan	
