= Miss Grand Cambodia 2024 =

10th edition of the Miss Grand Cambodia beauty pageant

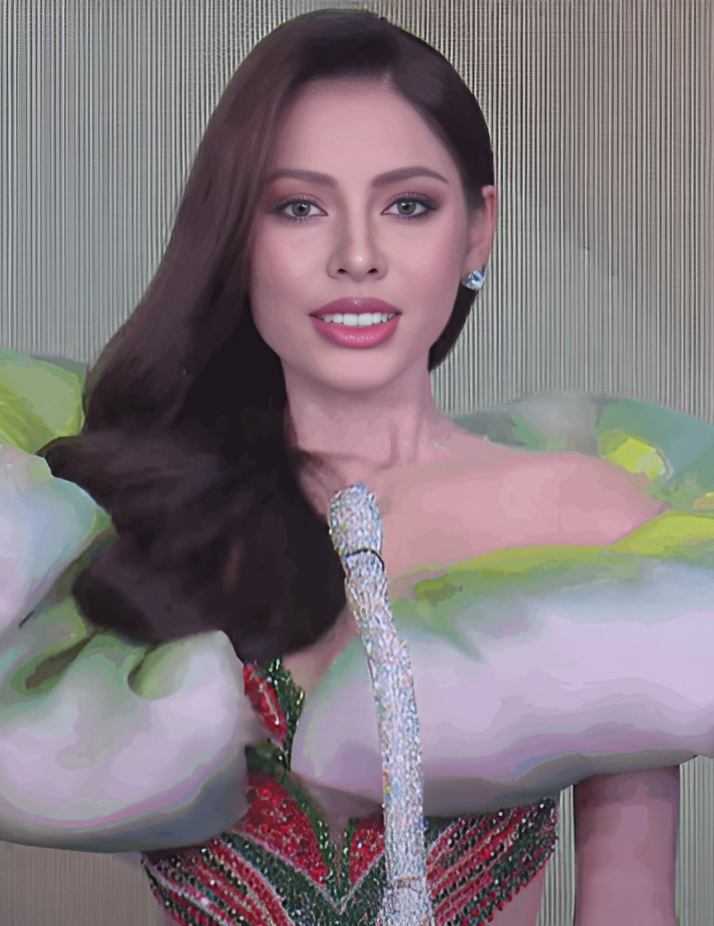
- Sotheary Bee, the winner of the contest
- Date: 12 July 2024
- Presenters: Mr. Summer
- Venue: Koh Pich Theater, Phnom Penh
- Broadcaster: YouTube, PNN
- Entrants: 28
- Placements: 16
- Debuts: Suong; Ta Khmau
- Returns: Poipet
- Winner: Sotheary Bee (Kampong Chhnang )
- Best National Costume: Panhavimealea Dy (Siem Reab)

Miss Grand Cambodia 2024 was the 10th edition of the Miss Grand Cambodia pageant, held in Koh Pich Theater in Phnom Penh on 12 July 2024. Contestants from 25 provinces and autonomous municipality of Cambodia competed for the title. At the end of the event, Phoem Sreynor of Phnom Penh crowned Sotheary Bee of Kampong Chhnang as her successor. Sotheary Bee was originally expected to represent the country at the international parent stage, Miss Grand International 2024, in Thailand on October 25, 2024, but withdrew due to conflicts between the 2024 Miss Grand Cambodia organizer, HK7 Co., Ltd., and the international organization.

This edition was the first Miss Grand Cambodia pageant where the right to send contestants was granted to local organizers, who organized the provincial pageants to elect the representatives.

== Background ==
=== Date and venue ===
The grand final round of the pageant was scheduled for June 2024. The pageant schedule is detailed below.

List of the main events in the Miss Grand Cambodia 2024 pageant
Date	Event	Venue	Ref.
10 April	Press Conference and Sashing Ceremony	Summer Bay Beach Club and Cabins, Preah Sihanouk	
8-11 May	MGC Visit to Siem Reap	Siem Reap	
17 May	Swimsuit Competition	Summer Bay Beach Club and Cabins, Preah Sihanouk	
24 May	Closed Door Interview	SORYA Center Point	
8 June	National Costume Competition	AEON Sen Sok Mall	
7 July	Preliminary Competition	NABA Theatre, Naga 2, Phnom Penh	
12 July	Grand Final Competition	Koh Pich Theater	

=== Selection of contestants ===
In this year's edition, the organizer of Miss Grand Cambodia contributed the right to send delegates to the provincial organizers, who then selected their representatives through the local stage. In the event of a lack of provincial licensees, the representatives for those provinces will be directly elected by the central committee through the audition process.

The following is the list of Miss Grand Cambodia 2024 provincial preliminary pageants.

Pageant	Edition	Date & Venue	Entrants	Provincial director	Ref.
Miss Grand Siem Reap	1st	January 25, 2024, at the Aeon Mall Sen Sok, Phnom Penh	15	Angie Ly	
Miss Grand Phnom Penh	1st	February 2, 2024, at the Aeon Mall Sen Sok, Phnom Penh	14	Sokun Linna	
Miss Grand Kampong Chhnang	1st	February 10, 2024, at the Aeon Mall Sen Sok, Phnom Penh	13	Khat Sreychan	
Miss Grand Kampong Cham	1st	February 25, 2024, at The Elysée, Koh Pich	12	Hong Kimlang	
Miss Grand Ratanakiri	1st	February 28, 2024, at the Aeon Mall Sen Sok, Phnom Penh	13	Ab Vanna	

== Results ==
Placement	Contestant	International pageant	Miss Grand Cambodia 2024 competition result by province Color key: Winner / 1st runner-up; 2nd runner-up / 3rd runner-up; 4th runner-up / Top 11 (5th RU); Top 16 / Unplaced
Miss Grand Cambodia 2024	Kampong Chhnang – Sotheary Bee	Withdrew – Miss Grand International 2024	Miss Grand Cambodia 2024 competition result by province Color key: Winner / 1st runner-up; 2nd runner-up / 3rd runner-up; 4th runner-up / Top 11 (5th RU); Top 16 / Unplaced
1st Runner-Up	Svay Rieng – Sreyneth Ry		Miss Grand Cambodia 2024 competition result by province Color key: Winner / 1st runner-up; 2nd runner-up / 3rd runner-up; 4th runner-up / Top 11 (5th RU); Top 16 / Unplaced
2nd Runner-Up	Siem Reap – Panhavimealea Dy		Miss Grand Cambodia 2024 competition result by province Color key: Winner / 1st runner-up; 2nd runner-up / 3rd runner-up; 4th runner-up / Top 11 (5th RU); Top 16 / Unplaced
3rd Runner-Up	Ratanakiri – Davy Mach ‡		Miss Grand Cambodia 2024 competition result by province Color key: Winner / 1st runner-up; 2nd runner-up / 3rd runner-up; 4th runner-up / Top 11 (5th RU); Top 16 / Unplaced
4th Runner-Up	Battambang – Phattaiya Phou		Miss Grand Cambodia 2024 competition result by province Color key: Winner / 1st runner-up; 2nd runner-up / 3rd runner-up; 4th runner-up / Top 11 (5th RU); Top 16 / Unplaced
5th Runner-Up	Kampong Cham – Sreypi Phorn	Top 22 – Miss Intercontinental 2024Top 21 - Miss Cosmo 2025	Miss Grand Cambodia 2024 competition result by province Color key: Winner / 1st runner-up; 2nd runner-up / 3rd runner-up; 4th runner-up / Top 11 (5th RU); Top 16 / Unplaced
5th Runner-Up	Kampot – Kunthea Thy; Oddar Meanchey – Socheata Kong §; Preah Sihanouk – Thida Pov; Stung Treng – Lida Sin (●); Takeo – Sovanrothana Morn		Miss Grand Cambodia 2024 competition result by province Color key: Winner / 1st runner-up; 2nd runner-up / 3rd runner-up; 4th runner-up / Top 11 (5th RU); Top 16 / Unplaced
Top 16	Kampong Thom – Lyla Ny; Kratié – Rotana Sok; Phnom Penh – Sereyroth Limchan; Prey Veng – Nika Kol; Suong – Ratanakphoung Phun		Miss Grand Cambodia 2024 competition result by province Color key: Winner / 1st runner-up; 2nd runner-up / 3rd runner-up; 4th runner-up / Top 11 (5th RU); Top 16 / Unplaced

(●): The candidates won the Miss Popular Choice Award (online voting) and got direct entry into Top 11 Finalists.

§ : The candidates won the National Director's Choice and got direct entry into Top 11 Finalists.

‡: The candidate won the Best Introduction Video Choice of the Year and got direct entry into Top 16 Semifinalists.

== Special awards and sub-contests ==
=== Special awards ===
Award	Contestant
Best Introduction Video Choice of the Year	Ratanakiri – Davy Mach
Miss Popular Vote	Stung Treng – Lida Sin
Best in National Costume	Siem Reap – Panhavimealea Dy
Best in Swimsuit	Kampong Chhnang – Sotheary Bee
Best in Evening Gown	Stung Treng – Lida Sin
Best in Introduction	Takéo – Sovannrothana Morn
Best Catwalk	Svay Rieng – Sreynet Rey
Best Makeup	Siem Reap – Panhavimealea Dy
National Director's Choice	Oddar Meanchey – Socheata Kong
Best Personality	Kandal – Savy Chhouk
Miss Photogenic	Stung Treng – Lida Sin
Miss I'Aura	Siem Reap – Panhavimealea Dy

=== Miss Popular Vote ===
The winner of the "Miss Popular Vote" was determined via public voting on the QR Pay app with the voting page for Miss Grand Cambodia, held on 12 July in Phnom Penh.

Rank	+/-	Contestant	%
1	▲	Stung Treng – Lida Sin	84
2	Steady	Ratanakiri – Davy Mach	81
3	▼1	Kampong Cham – Sreypi Phorn	68
4	▼1	Kampong Chhnang – Sotheary By	42
5	▲	Battambang – Phattiya Phou	30

=== Country's Power of the Year challenge ===
The Country's Power of the Year award was an award that allowed fans to be able to vote for delegates to advance to the Top 15 through Instagram and Facebook.

Placement	Contestant
Winner	Ratanakiri – Davy Mach
Runner-up	Siem Reap – Panhavimealea Dy

=== Best National Costume ===
The Best National Costume Contest was organized at the AEON Sen Sok Mall, Phnom Penh, on 8 June 2024. The top 10 qualified costumes were determined through both public vote and the judges' selection; however, the winning costumes was directly elected by the panel of judges from the final costumes and was later announced on the grand final stage on 12 July.

Results	Selection	Contestant
Best National Costume		Siem Reap – Panhavimealea Dy
Best National Costume Performance		Phnom Penh – Sereyroth Limchan
Runners-up (Top 3)		Oddar Meanchey – Socheata Kong; Ratanakiri – Davy Mach
Top 7	Vote	Kampong Chhnang – Sotheary By
Top 7	Judges	Banteay Meanchey – Sokparkpitt Chap; Prey Veng – Nika Kol
Top 10	Vote	Svay Rieng – Sreynet Rey; Takéo – Sovannrothana Morn
Top 10	Judges	Pailin – Khim Sok

=== Best in Evening Gown ===
Placement	Contestant
Winner	Stung Treng – Lida Sin
Runners-up (Top 3)	Kampong Chhnang – Sotheary By; Kratié – Ratana Sok

=== Best in Makeup ===
Placement	Contestant
Winner	Siem Reap – Panhavimealea Dy
Runners-up (Top 3)	Koh Kong – Khoeunkunthy Ritheany; Preah Sihanouk – Thida Pov

=== HK7 Best Seller ===
The HK7 Best Seller award was an award that allowed fans to be able to vote for delegates in terms of who got the most views on selling products by HK7 through Instagram and Facebook.

Placement	Contestant
Top 7	Kampong Cham – Sreypi Phorn; Kampong Thom – Lyla Ny; Kampot – Kunthea Thy; Ratanakiri – Davy Mach; Siem Reap – Panhavimealea Dy; Suong – Ratanakphoung Phun; Takéo – Sovannrothana Morn

== Contestants ==
Twenty-eight contestants competed for the title of Miss Grand Cambodia 2024.

Province	Candidate		Hometown	Age	Height
Province	Romanized name	Khmer name	Hometown	Age	Height
Banteay Meanchey	Sokparkpitt Chap	ចាប សុផាកភីត	Phnom Penh	24	1.66 m (5 ft 5 1/2 in)
Battambang	Phattiya Phou	ភូ ផាត់ធីយ៉ា	Phnom Penh	23	1.70 m (5 ft 7 in)
Kampong Cham	Sreypi Phorn	ផន ស្រីពី	Phnom Penh	22	1.74 m (5 ft 8 1/2 in)
Kampong Chhnang	Sotheary Bee	ប៊ី សុធារី	Phnom Penh	26	1.75 m (5 ft 9 in)
Kampong Speu	Chhuny Mao	ម៉ៅ ឈុននី	Kampong Speu	20	1.70 m (5 ft 7 in)
Kampong Thom	Lyla Ny	នី លីឡា		24	1.70 m (5 ft 7 in)
Kampot	Kunthea Thy	ធី គន្ធា	Phnom Penh	23	1.72 m (5 ft 7 1/2 in)
Kandal	Savy Chhouk	ឈូក សាវីា	Svay Rieng	23	1.70 m (5 ft 7 in)
Kep	Sreydeth Don	ដន ស្រីដែត	Prey Veng	23	1.70 m (5 ft 7 in)
Koh Kong	Khoeunkunthy Ritheany	ឃឿន គន្ធីរោទ្ធានី		22	1.66 m (5 ft 5 1/2 in)
Kratié	Ratana Sok	សុខ រតនា	Phnom Penh	19	1.70 m (5 ft 7 in)
Mondulkiri	Sopheak En	អេន សុភ័ក្រ	Phnom Penh	22	1.70 m (5 ft 7 in)
Oddar Meanchey	Socheata Kong	គង់ សុជាតា		24	1.75 m (5 ft 9 in)
Pailin	Khim Sok	សុខ ឃីមា		25	1.67 m (5 ft 5 1/2 in)
Phnom Penh	Lima Chan (Sereyroth Limchan)	ចិន លីម៉ា (លឹម ចាន់សិរីរ័ត្ន)	Phnom Penh	25	1.70 m (5 ft 7 in)
Poipet	Dalin Ny	នី ដាលីន	Phnom Penh	20	1.70 m (5 ft 7 in)
Preah Sihanouk	Thida Pov	ពៅ ធិតា		22	1.78 m (5 ft 10 in)
Preah Vihear	Seakliv Kreoung	គ្រឿង សៀកលីវ		27	1.67 m (5 ft 5 1/2 in)
Prey Veng	Nika Kol	កុល នីកា	Phnom Penh	22	1.68 m (5 ft 6 in)
Pursat	Lihour Sreng	ស្រេង លីហ៊ួរ	Kandal	21	1.68 m (5 ft 6 in)
Ratanakiri	Davy Mach	ម៉ាច ដាវី	Phnom Penh	26	1.76 m (5 ft 9 1/2 in)
Siem Reap	Panhavimealea Dy	ឌី បញ្ញាវិមាលា	Kampong Chhnang	18	1.72 m (5 ft 7 1/2 in)
Stung Treng	Lida Sin	សុីន លីដា	Prey Veng	21	1.70 m (5 ft 7 in)
Suong	Ratanakphoung Phun	ភន់ រតនៈភួង	Prey Veng	23	1.67 m (5 ft 5 1/2 in)
Svay Rieng	Sreyneth Ry	រី ស្រីនេត	Preah Sihanouk	23	1.70 m (5 ft 7 in)
Takéo	Sovannrothana Morn	ម៉ន សុវណ្ណរត្តនា		22	1.76 m (5 ft 9 1/2 in)
Ta Khmau	Phaya Eam	អៀម ផាយា	Kandal	23	1.70 m (5 ft 7 in)
Tboung Khmum	Sreylin Sitha	សុីថា ស្រីលីន	Phnom Penh	22	1.69 m (5 ft 6 1/2 in)

== Crossovers and returnees ==
Contestants who previously competed or will be competing at other beauty pageants:

=== Local Pageants ===
Miss Grand Kampong Cham

- 2024: Sreypi Phorn (Winner)

Miss Grand Kampong Chhnang

- 2024: Sotheary By (Winner)
- 2024: Phattiya Phou (1st runner-up)

Miss Grand Phnom Penh

- 2024: Sereyroth Limchan (1st runner-up) (appointed as winner)
- 2024: Phaya Eam (Top 8)

Miss Grand Ratanakiri

- 2024: Davy Mach (Winner)
- 2024: Thida Pov (1st runner-up)

Miss Grand Siem Reap

- 2024: Panhavimealea Dy (Winner)

=== National Pageants ===
Miss Cambodia

- 2016: Sotheary By (Winner)

Miss Universe Cambodia

- 2020: Mach Davy (Top 10)

Miss Grand Cambodia

- 2021: Phattiya Phou (Top 10) (as Takéo) (Miss Popular Vote)
- 2021: Phaya Eam (Unplaced) (as Banteay Meanchey)
- 2022: Phattiya Phou (Top 15) (as Siem Reap)
- 2023: Kunthea Thy (Top 16) (as Kampong Cham)
- 2023: Sreydeth Don (Top 16) (as Prey Veng)

Miss Teen International Cambodia

- 2021/2022: Panhavimealea Dy (Winner – 2021)
- 2023: Ratana Sok (Unplaced)

Miss Earth Cambodia

- 2024: Nika Kol (4th runner-up) (as Kampong Cham)
- 2024: Ratana Sok (5th runner-up/Top 10) (as Koh Kong)
- 2024: Chhouk Savy (5th runner-up/Top 10) (as Svay Rieng)
- 2024: Lihour Sreng (Unplaced) (as Bokor)
- 2024: Dalin Ny (Unplaced) (as Kampong Chhnang)
- 2024: Sreylin Sitha (did not compete) (as Pailin)
- 2024: Kunthea Thy (did not compete) (as Tboung Khmum)

=== International Pageants ===
Miss Universe

- 2017: Sotheary By (Unplaced)

Miss Charm

- 2023: Sotheary By (Unplaced) (Winner – Best in National Costume)

Miss Teen International

- 2022: Panhavimealea Dy (Top 11) (Winner – Best in Swimsuit)
