= Tboung Khmum (National Assembly constituency) =

Constituency of the National Assembly of Cambodia

- National Assembly constituency
- Province: Tboung Khmum
- Population: 776,841
- Major settlements: Suong

Current constituency
- Created: 1993
- Seats: 8
- Member(s): Chea Sophara; Chat Borin; Heng Samrin; Keo Piseth; Mot Yusoh; Prach Chan; Say Sam Al; Vong Soth

Tboung Khmum (Khmer: ត្បូងឃ្មុំ) is one of the 25 constituencies of the National Assembly of Cambodia. It is allocated 8 seats in the National Assembly.
