= Australia–Cambodia relations =

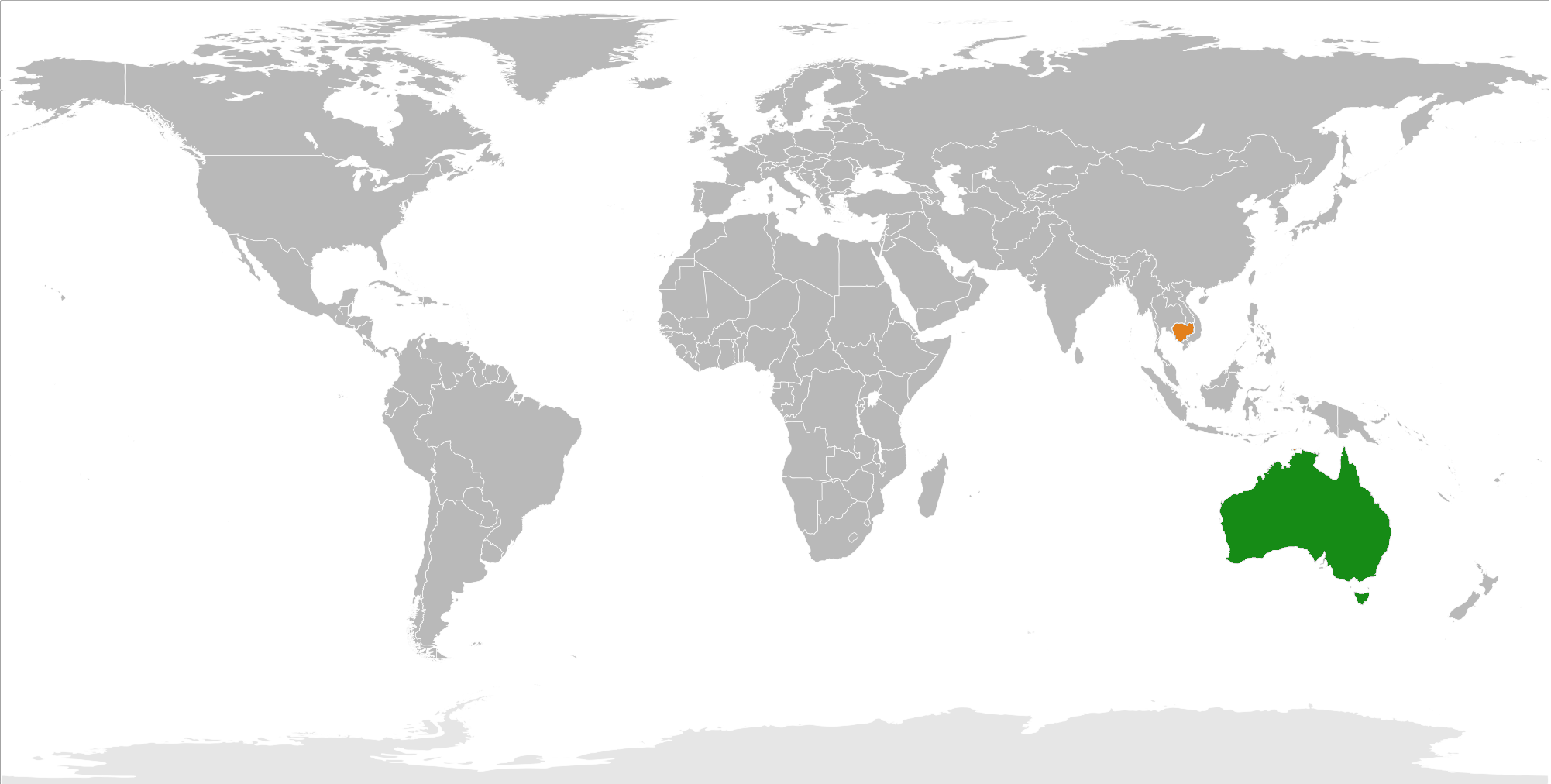

- Australia: Cambodia

Australia entered into diplomatic relations with Cambodia in 1952. In 1955, the first Australian legation was opened in Phnom Penh, with the Australian minister to Cambodia previously working out of Saigon, modern day Ho Chi Minh City, Vietnam. The Cambodian Embassy to Australia is located in the nation's capital, Canberra.

Prior to the beginning of diplomatic relations, the Colombo Plan, was the first instance in which the two countries were engaged with one another. The Vietnam War and Cambodia's forced involvement in it led to considerable efforts on behalf of Australia and their diplomats in aiding in the countries reunification and delivery of justice to those involved in the genocides of 1975-1979. Australia had a large role in the works of the United Nations Transitional Authority in Cambodia (UNTAC), a United Nations peace-keeping body set up in Cambodia in 1991. Additionally, Australia continues to fund the Extraordinary Chambers in the Courts of Cambodia (ECCC), a court system with the sole purpose of bringing justice to those responsible for committing crimes against humanity during Pol Pot's reign of Cambodia. An agreement between the two countries in 2014 has meant that Cambodia is currently accepting a number of Australia's refugees housed within the Nauru Regional Processing Centre. Meanwhile, as both countries belong to the ASEAN-Australia-New Zealand Free Trade Agreement, trade between Cambodia and Australia has been growing rapidly with Australia listed as Cambodia's 18th most important trade nation. Furthermore, both countries are working closely to combat people smuggling, human trafficking, child sex tourism, narcotics trafficking, and terrorism.

== History ==
=== Colombo Plan ===
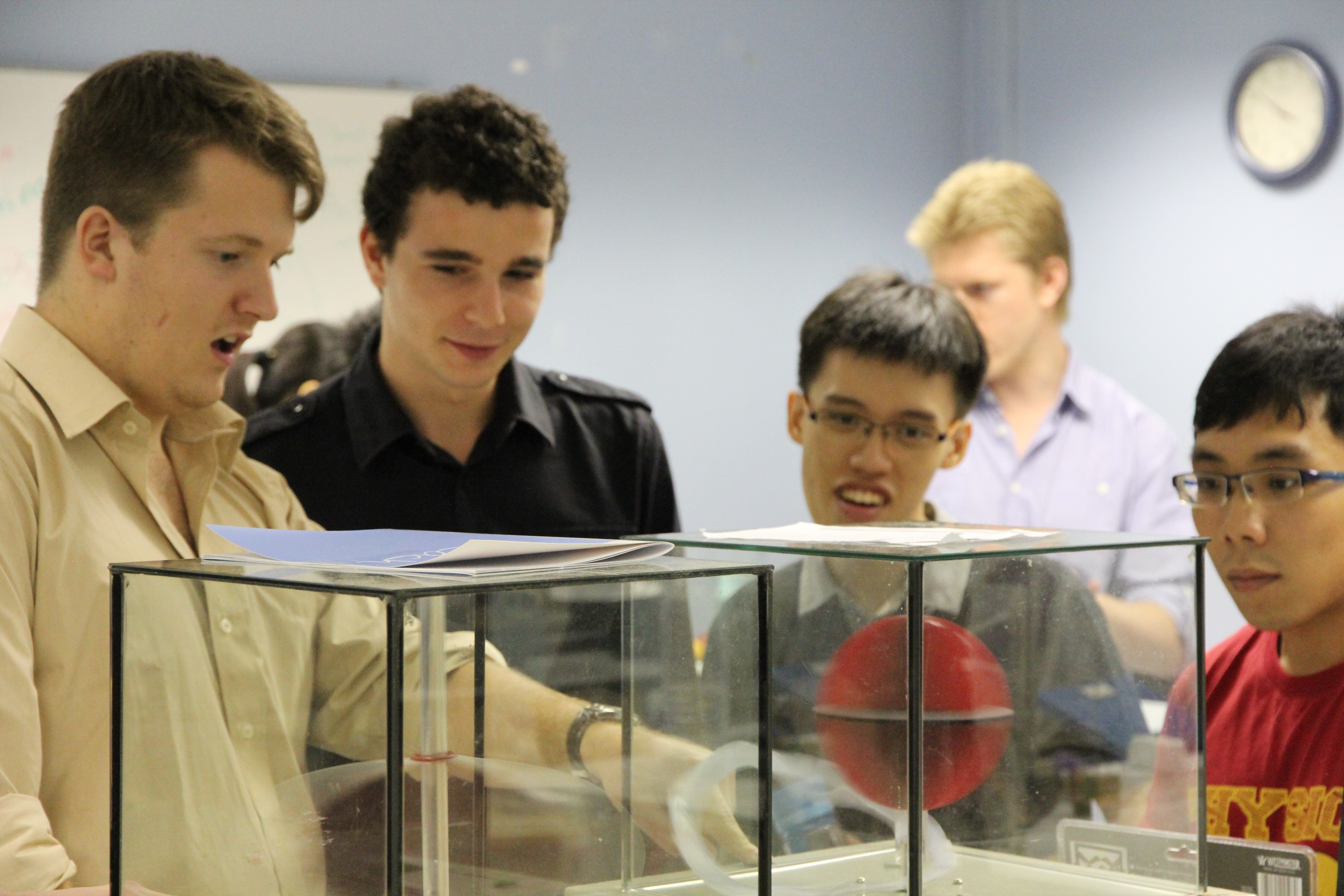
New Colombo Plan Students in Singapore

Launched in 1951, The Colombo Plan was one of Australia's first non-war-related efforts of connecting with South-East Asian nations. The Colombo Plan is an initiative in which developed countries like Australia and the US have looked to strengthen their relations with South-East Asian and Pacific Nations by providing them with opportunities for both social and economic development. While the program's signatories each made various contributions, one of Australia's more notable contributions was the provision of education and training to participants in the program. They have provided scholarships and allowed members to participate actively in their own fields of study in Australia in order to provide them with an opportunity to expand and sharpen their skill sets before returning home. Over the first 30 years, 20,000 students were given this opportunity with a number of these students originating from Cambodia. Australian Colombo representatives were also responsible for the running of a municipal vehicle and machinery workshop in Cambodia's capital, Phnom Penh. As of December 2021, the Colombo Plan is still active, however Australia has now also produced a new initiative called the New Colombo Plan which seeks to support Australian undergraduate students in studying and completing internships in Indo-Pacific nations such as Cambodia.

=== Vietnam War ===
Prior to the breakout of the Vietnam War into Cambodia, Australian diplomats had claimed it would be in Australia's best interests to ensure that Cambodia maintained its neutral standing as they were concerned by the potential influence the Chinese Government would hold over Cambodia if they were brought into the conflict.

In May 1970 US and South Vietnamese Troops entered Cambodia in an attempt to gain an advantage over the North Vietnamese by capturing enemy resources, destroying bunkers, and killing enemy soldiers. Due to this military ploy the Khmer Rouge's influence grew stronger as the Cambodian people did not look fondly on their forced involvement in Vietnam's war. In turn, this caused the weakening of the Cambodian Government, allowing the Khmer Rouge to impose themselves over the Cambodian people. Furthermore, US President Richard Nixon made the decision to bomb areas of Cambodia in order to halt Northern Vietnamese efforts. These events contributed to a destruction of Cambodian neutrality, and an eventual hiatus of diplomatic relations between Australia and Cambodia as all Australian diplomats were withdrawn from the country.

Bilateral relations between the two nations resumed again in 1991 after both Pol Pot's regime and the ten-year Vietnamese occupation of Cambodia that followed had concluded.

=== The Moratorium Marches ===
The Moratorium Marches of 1970 were a result of Cambodia's forced inclusion in the War. With more than 200,000 Australians protesting in the war in Vietnam, these protests were, at the time, the largest public demonstrations to ever occur in Australia. Displeasure towards the war continued until 1974, and demonstrative efforts at that time were mainly found on university campuses across the country. These protests were not limited to Australia, with people all across the world expressing their displeasure towards the events of the Vietnam War.

=== United Nations Transitional Authority in Cambodia (UNTAC) ===
The UNTAC Logo

In the 1990s Australia played a key role in developing and implementing the successful policies that came as a result of the Paris Peace Accords in 1991. The Paris Accords took place to mark the end of the war between Vietnam and Cambodia and resulted in the creation of the United Nations Transitional Authority in Cambodia (UNTAC). The UNTAC was a UN peace-keeping body that looked to not only monitor but assume responsibility for conflict-management in Cambodia. One of UNTAC's key roles was to overlook the successful running of the 1994 elections in Cambodia, and because of their work a new Cambodian Royal government was able to be formed. Australia sent more than 500 personnel to assist in UNTAC operations. They also provided A$92 million in aid over a four-year period (1994-1998) following the appointment of the new government.

=== Extraordinary Chambers in the Courts of Cambodia (ECCC) ===
Australia have also provided support to Cambodia through the Extraordinary Chambers in the Courts of Cambodia. The ECCC is a court system in Cambodia that's purpose is to bring to justice those who were responsible for the crimes and genocide committed by the Khmer Rouge. In 2012, Australia had contributed more than AUD$18 million to the court and was considered the second largest contributor to the ECCC. Australia have also provided funding to support public outreach campaigns and is an active member of the Principal Donors Group in New York and 'Friends of the ECCC' group in Phnom Penh. The first Cambodian and international judges (including Australian Rowan Downing) and prosecutors were sworn in on July 3, 2006. Between 2004 and 2020 the ECCC have reportedly received AUD$40.05 in contributions from Australia.

== Migration ==
After the Vietnamese overthrowing of the Khmer Rouge in 1978 numerous Cambodians moved to Australia in search of a better life. Over the next 10 years, an even larger number of Cambodians crossed over either as refugees or migrants, looking to be reunited with family members who had come earlier. As of June 2009, there were close to 26,000 people of Khmer ancestry and 10,000 of Chinese-Cambodian ancestry living in Australia, with 60% of those living in Sydney found in the Fairfield local government area. More recently, the 2016 Australian Census reported 66,000 people of Cambodian Ancestry living across the country. Meanwhile, in 2021 there are between 6000-7000 Australians currently living in Cambodia.

=== 2014 Refugee Resettlement Agreement ===
The 2014 Refugee Resettlement Agreement deal consisted of the Australian Government paying Cambodia AU$40 million, and in exchange, Cambodia agreed to accept some of Australia's rejected asylum seekers. The Australian Immigration Minister at the time, Scott Morrison, in a statement to the press, said 'only genuine refugees' housed in Nauru's processing centre would pertain to the deal. This was also written in as part of the Memorandum of Understanding (MOU). There is no cap on the number of refugees that can be sent over to Cambodia, the MOU states that the volume of refugees, along with the timing of their arrival, is subject to consent provided by Cambodian officials. The deal was signed in Phnom Penh by both Scott Morrison and Cambodian Interior Minister Sar Kheng.

The deal sparked criticisms from rights group such as Human Rights Watch, Freedom House, and the UNHCR. Cambodians, including Buddhist monks, protested in front of the Australian embassy against the deal citing that Cambodia "can't even look after its own", pointing to poverty and human rights concerns in Cambodia.

== COVID-19 pandemic ==
According to The Sydney Morning Herald, the Australian Government committed to providing 60 million doses of COVID-19 vaccines to nations in South-East Asia and the Pacific by year's end in 2022. In November 2021, Cambodian Prime Minister Hun Sen questioned Australia's deliverance on their pledge of 2 million vaccinations to his country claiming that if they did not deliver on their promise, he would be buying the vaccines directly from China. Two months earlier, Phnom Penh was reported as the “world's most vaccinated capital city”. This was due largely to the country's reliance on Chinese vaccinations. Hun Sen's urgency came due to the desire to meet the country's overall vaccination targets, while Australia's embassy in Phnom Penh were unable to provide an answer to the Prime Minister's request. As of November 2021, Australia had donated close to 10% of their 60 million promised vaccinations, with Indonesia, Vietnam and Fiji receiving 2.2, 1.52 and 0.97 million vaccinations respectively.

== Trade and business ==
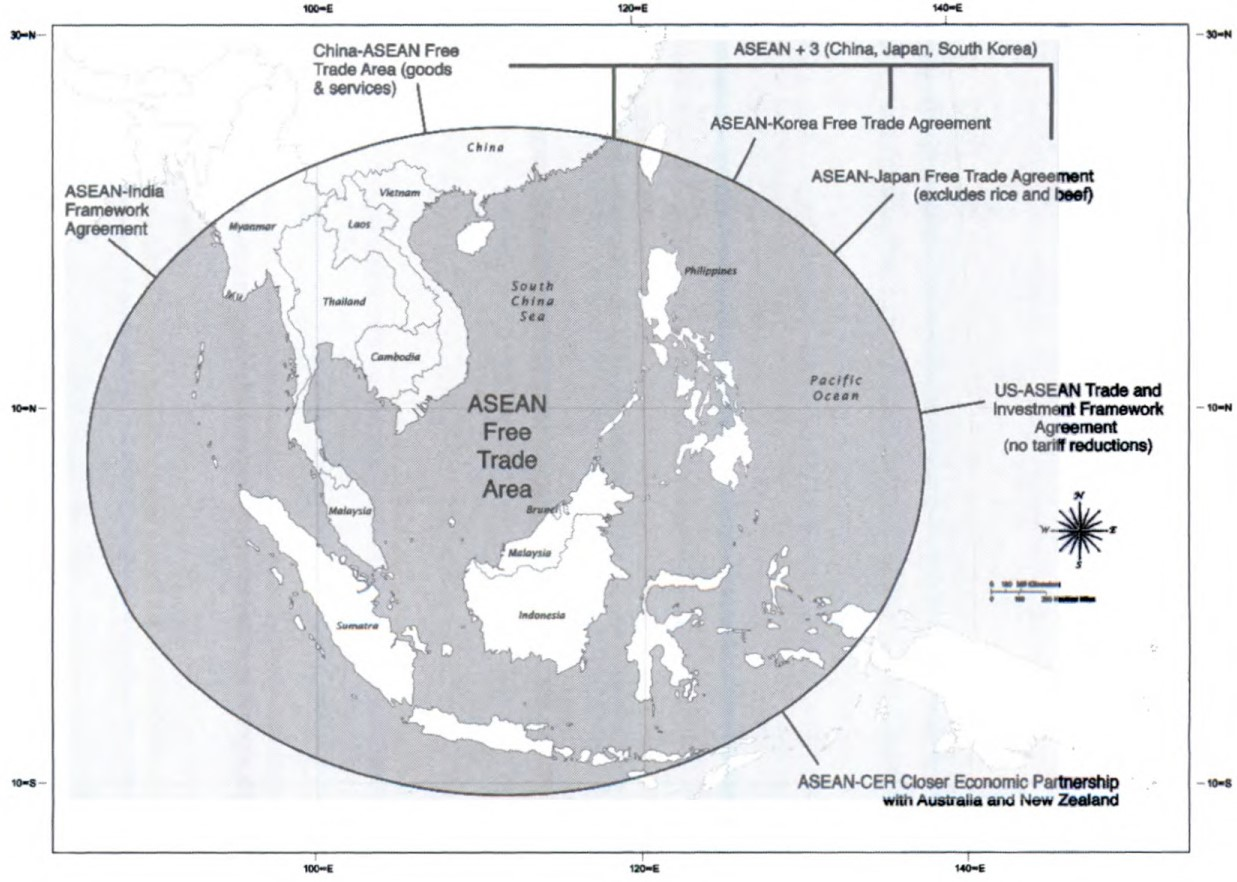
Countries in ASEAN free trade agreement.

The trade relationship between Australia and Cambodia is growing rapidly. In 2020, total two-way trade between the two was valued at AUD$432 million, which was a 21.6% increase on the year before. Australian total goods exports to Cambodia in 2020 also saw a 43% increase on the year prior. In both directions of trade, Australia ranks at 18th on the list of Cambodia's most important trade partners. Cambodia's main exports to Australia are of textile clothing and footwear while their Australian imports consists largely of wheat and cereal preparations.

As of 2010, both countries are a part of the ASEAN-Australia-New Zealand free trade agreement which allows for "extensive tariff reduction and greater certainty for services suppliers and investors" to its participating nations. Other nations that have signed onto to the agreement include Vietnam, Thailand and Myanmar.

The Australian Chamber of Commerce (Auscham) is an organisation within Cambodia that was established in 1995, its core aim is to represent Australian businesses and business people in Cambodia. They do so by creating a network between Australian and Cambodian businesses with an interest of projecting a positive image of Australia in Cambodia. The organisations three main goals are to focus on the needs of their members, to help build relationships and connect people, and to create a lasting community.

== Sport ==
Further relations between the two nations can be seen through sporting club affiliations and organisations set up in Cambodia. The Cambodian Eagles are an Australian Rules Football Club (AFL) based in Cambodia with players and supporters of the club extending from Australia, the US, and the UK, amongst other nations. Previously named the 'Cambodian Cobras', the club changed names and begun its affiliation with the West Coast Eagles, an Australian-based AFL club, following the West Coast Eagles' visit to Phnom Penh in 2011. This ongoing relationship has allowed for the Cambodian Eagles to gain sponsorship through the Australian club and compete in various Asian Championships.

Additionally, Happy Football Cambodia Australia (HFCA) is an organisation that was set up in 2005 with the aspiration to support the disadvantaged youth of Cambodia. Scott Neeson, the founder of HFCA, outlines his view of the organisation stating:

"HFCA is a terrific organisation and we're very proud of our association. It gives otherwise neglected youth a sense of self-esteem, competition and the value of teamwork. Those able to make the Homeless World Cup team are given a world perspective they could never otherwise imagine. In terms of return on investment, it's one of the best in Cambodia."

HFCA teaches the young and disadvantaged about football whilst providing them with opportunities to improve their living conditions and their futures.

== Resident diplomatic missions ==
- Australia has an embassy in Phnom Penh.
- Cambodia has an embassy in Canberra.

== See also ==
- Foreign relations of Australia
- Foreign relations of Cambodia
- Cambodian Australians
