= Cambodians in France =

Ethnic group

Total population
- 80,000 (2020)

Regions with significant populations
- Paris, Lyon

Languages
- French, Khmer

Religion
- Theravada Buddhism

Related ethnic groups
- Asians in France

Cambodians in France (French: Cambodgiens en France; Khmer: ជនជាតិខ្មែរនៅប្រទេសបារាំង) consist of ethnic Khmer people who were born in or immigrated to France. The population as of 2020 was estimated to be about 80,000 making the community one of the largest in the Cambodian diaspora. The Cambodian population in France is the most established outside Southeast Asia, with a presence dating to well before the Vietnam War and subsequent Indochina refugee crisis including the horrors of Pol Pot and the Khmer Rouge who took over in Phnom Penh on 17 April 1975. A few numbers of Cambodian people were able to escape and migrate to France before the Khmer Rouge took power in Cambodia as the Cambodian Civil War came to an end and overthrow U.S.-backed military dictatorship of Lon Nol and the Khmer Republic. His brother Lon Non and the other Khmer officials were arrested and executed by the CPK, the Marxist-Leninist dictatorship that seized power in Phnom Penh. 13 days before the Fall of Saigon and the Second Indochina War ended on 30 April 1975. In December 1978, after the Khmer Rouge attacked the Vietnamese border, Lê Duẩn orders his troops to attack and invade Cambodia with Soviet-backed Vietnam captured Phnom Penh against Maoist-led Khmer Rouge that been supported by Chairman Mao from Beijing that forced Pot and his Angkar troops to flee the capital back into the mountainous jungles of Anlong Veng near the Thai border which continued to do guerilla warfare from 1979 until 1997, after the kingdom was restored in 1993 with Sihanouk becoming king once again of which millions of Cambodians greeted him as their hero. On 15 April 1998, Pol Pot died in his sleep at his jungle headquarters in Oddar Meanchey and was cremated near the border of Thailand.

== History ==
Cambodian immigration to France began in the later half of the 19th century, when Cambodia became a French protectorate. The first wave of migrants largely consisted of students and workers belonging to the country's elite class, including members of the royal family. During World War I, soldiers and civilians in the French colonial empire were recruited to help with the war effort in Metropolitan France. About 2,000 Cambodians arrived in France during the conflict period.

Following Cambodian independence in 1953, many students and professionals from Cambodia continued to arrive in France. While most of these individuals returned to their home country after a brief sojourn, as the Cambodian Civil War erupted in the late 1960s, most opted to remain permanently in France and sponsored the immigration of family members. With a Cambodian community already established since the early 20th century, the Paris region was the destination of choice for both Cambodian immigrants arriving in France and those studying or working elsewhere in the country.

The majority of Cambodians arrived in France as refugees as a result of their country's heavy turmoil during the latter half of the 20th century. Following the Khmer Rouge takeover in 1975, a small number of Cambodians were able to flee their country and arrive in France with the French government's assistance. A much larger influx of refugees arrived in France during the Cambodian–Vietnamese War that resulted in the collapse of the Khmer Rouge and end of the Cambodian genocide in 1979.

Roughly 50,000 Cambodian refugees arrived in France by 1989. France was an ideal destination for Cambodians who were educated or already had family present in the country, while poorer and uneducated refugees tended to immigrate to the United States and Australia. The final wave of refugees arrived in the late 1990s, when the last refugee camps closed. In contrast to the Vietnamese, Laotian and ethnic Chinese populations in France, Cambodian refugees from conflicts in Indochina arrived relatively later compared to their peers, and had a harder time finding government assistance.

== Culture and demographics ==
The Cambodian French population is concentrated in Paris and the surrounding Île-de-France region, as well as in Lyon and the Rhône-Alpes region.

In contrast to Cambodian communities in the United States, Canada, and Australia, the Cambodian population in France is on average, more educated, older and has a much higher average income. While the community is still attached to its country of origin in some cultural spheres, Cambodians in France have largely integrated into French society. Cambodians in France have managed to achieve a model minority image; and have income and education levels higher than other Cambodian diaspora communities, although average income levels for the community remain slightly lower than the national average.

Buddhism plays an important role in the community and is seen as a marker of ethnic identity; in contrast, the ability to speak the Khmer language is less emphasized. Though immigrant parents set up language schools for their children soon after migration, many children discontinued their language studies due to the difficulty of learning Khmer grammar and the Sanskrit-based Khmer alphabet.

Numerically, the Khmer are the dominant group among Cambodians in France, but Cambodians of Chinese descent can also be found among the population; though interethnic marriages between Chinese and Khmers were common in Cambodia and remain so in France, the Chinese have tended to organise themselves around the varieties they speak and remain somewhat separate from other Cambodians in France. A small number of Cambodians in France consist of the wives and mixed-race children of French colonisers who repatriated to France between 1955 and 1965; regardless of their ethnicity, many of those used Khmer rather than French as their home language.

== Notable people ==
- Aurélia Aurita - author
- Thierry Chantha Bin, footballer
- Frédéric Chau, actor
- Leanna Chea, actress
- Davy Chou, filmmaker
- Albert Veera Chey, professional kickboxer
- Bun Kenny, tennis player
- Bora "YellOwStaR" Kim, League of Legends Pro Gamer
- Bérénice Marlohe, actress; known for work in James Bond film Skyfall.
- Rithy Panh, film director; directed documentary film S-21: The Khmer Rouge Killing Machine .
- Makhali-Phâl - poet
- Christine Phung, fashion designer.
- Sam Rainsy, economist and politician
- Tioulong Saumura, financial analyst and politician
- Skalpovich, record producer, composer, songwriter and record executive
- Mam Sonando, journalist
- Harmony Tan, professional tennis player
- Élodie Yung, actress; known for work in G.I. Joe: Retaliation and Elektra in Daredevil.

== See also ==
- Cambodia–France relations
- Cambodian diaspora
- Immigration to France
- Asian diasporas in France
