= Miss Grand Cambodia 2016 =

2nd Miss Grand Cambodia competition, beauty pageant edition

- Date: July 30, 2016
- Venue: Nagaworld Hotel Grand Ballroom, Phnom Penh
- Broadcaster: MyTV
- Entrants: 23
- Placements: 10
- Winner: Heng Chantha (Phnom Penh)

External videos
- Miss Grand Cambodia 2016 Final Coronation Night, on July 5, 2016, YouTube video

Miss Grand Cambodia 2016 was the second edition of the Miss Grand Cambodia beauty pageant, held at the Nagaworld Hotel in Phnom Penh, on June 30, 2016. Twenty-three contestants, who qualified for the national contest through online screening, competed for the title, of whom a 19-year-old nursing student from Phnom Penh, Heng Chantha, was named the winner, and was expected to represent the country at the Miss Grand International 2016 pageant in Las Vegas, Nevada, however, her visa application was rejected by the U.S. Immigration and Customs Enforcement caused her to withdraw from the competition.

The event was broadcast live to the audience nationwide on MyTV.

== Result ==
Miss Grand Cambodia 2016 competition result
| Position | Delegate |
|---|---|
| Miss Grand Cambodia 2016 | Heng Chantha |
| 1st runner-up | Bun Leakhena |
| 2nd runner-up | Chea Gechheang |
| 3rd runner-up | Song SavVichheka |
| 4th runner-up | Chev Thavory |

== Candidates ==
Twenty-three candidates competed for the title.

| No. | Contestant | | Age |
| No. | Ramonized name | Khmer name | Age |
|---|---|---|---|
| 01. | Kong Thidapich | គង់ ធីតាពេជ្ | 18 |
| 02. | | | 19 |
| 03. | | | 18 |
| 04. | | | 18 |
| 05. | | | 18 |
| 06. | | | 18 |
| 07. | Hong Chihoun | ហុងជីហ៊ុន | 19 |
| 08. | | | 21 |
| 09. | Sothida Pokimtheng | ប៉ូគឹមថេង សុទ្ធធីតា | 19 |
| 10. | | | 23 |
| 11. | Dyna | ឌីណា | 21 |
| 12. | | | 19 |
| 13. | Yom Sreybi | យ៉ុម ស្រីប៊ី | 23 |
| 14. | | | 22 |
| 15. | Vanna Bounmy | វណ្ណា បូណ៌មី | 18 |
| 16. | Phay Ravy | ផៃ រ៉ាវី | 19 |
| 17. | Boren Chhouen | | 20 |
| 18. | Dara Rachana | ដារ៉ា រចនា | 18 |
| 19. | Neou Sreyleng | នៅ ស្រីឡេង | 21 |
| 20. | | | 21 |
| 21. | Chea Gechheang | ជា ហ្គិចហៀង | 21 |
| 22. | Heng Chantha | ហេង ចន្ថា | 22 |
| 23. | Yom Sreybi | យ៉ុម ស្រីប៊ី | 18 |
