= Rowan Downing =

Australian barrister

Rowan Downing, QC, an Australian barrister and international jurist, is a member of the international judiciary of the Extraordinary Chambers in the Courts of Cambodia.

== Biography ==
In 1971 Downing was awarded a Commonwealth Government Scholarship to study for a Bachelor of Laws and Bachelor of Arts degrees. He was a resident of Ormond College from 1971 to 1975 and a tutor in law at Whitley College and the College of Legal Training from 1977 to 1980. He completed a Master of Laws degree in 1980 from the Melbourne Law School.

Downing is a senior Australian lawyer who has worked on aid projects since 1993. He was a judge of the Supreme Court and Court of Appeal in Vanuatu from 1993 to 1995 as part of AusAID. During this period he provided continuing legal education courses to members of the legal profession and introduced new processes in the courts for the protection of women and children. Following this period he returned to the Victorian Bar where his practice included commercial law, company law, administrative law, employment law, finance and trade law, regulatory law, land law, criminal law, banking law and human rights law. He was frequently involved in commercial projects and administrative law, human resources and regulatory work for the Asian Development Bank, including an SME development project in the Lao PDR and a review of the employment and administrative law regulations of the Bank, as a staff consultant. He returned to Vanuatu in 1999 and was the Solicitor General until 2002. He established the Financial Intelligence Unit of Vanuatu and subsequently worked to establish like units in Indonesia and Samoa. He has advised the State Bank of Vietnam and many donors in respect of the design of projects to assist the development of the legal sector in failed, conflicted and developing nations.

In 2006 he took up a position as an international judge for the United Nations Assistance to the Khmer Rouge Tribunal (UNAKRT) at the Extraordinary Chambers of the Courts of Cambodia, initially working half time and then from 2010, full-time. Prior to working full-time in Cambodia with the United Nations, he maintained his practice and also worked on international aid projects in 14 countries.

In December 2014, Rowan was voted by the UN General Assembly to the bench of the United Nations Dispute Tribunal in Geneva.
