= Miss Grand Cambodia 2022 =

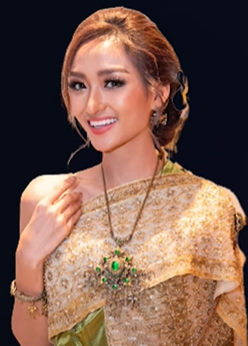
- Pich Saravody Votey, the winner of the contest
- Date: 27 August 2022
- Presenters: Khat Srlychan and Malis Chan
- Venue: The Union of Youth Federations of Cambodia, Phnom Penh, Cambodia
- Broadcaster: YouTube
- Entrants: 35
- Placements: 15
- Debuts: Bavet; Bokor; Canada; New Zealand; Poipet; Thailand (Surin); Vietnam (Kampuchea Krom)
- Returns: Australia; France; United States
- Winner: Pich Votey Saravody (Preah Sihanouk)
- Miss Star International Cambodia: Sreynuch Eang (Takéo)
- Best Evening Gown: Soriyan Hang (Cambodian Vietnamese)

External videos
- Miss Grand Cambodia 2022 Grand Final Competition, on 27 May 2022, YouTube video

Miss Grand Cambodia 2022 was the eighth edition of the Miss Grand Cambodia beauty contest, held on 27 August 2022 at the Union of Youth Federations of Cambodia in Phnom Penh, Cambodia. Miss Grand Cambodia 2021 Pokimtheng Sothida crowned her successor, Pich Votey Saravody, at the end of the event.

Delegates from twenty-five provinces and three cities of Cambodia, as well as Cambodian communities in seven countries, competed for the title, of which, the representative of Preah Sihanouk province, Saravady Pich Votey, was announced the winner, and represented the country at Miss Grand International 2022.

== Background ==
=== Location and date ===
The eighth edition of the Miss Grand Cambodia beauty contest was scheduled to be held on 27 August 2022, with the press conference of the contest held in Phnom Penh.

List of the main events in the Miss Grand Cambodia 2022 pageant
Date	Event	Venue	Ref.
6 May	Press Conference	Phnom Penh	
22 August	Swimsuit Competition	Mermaid Swimming School, Phnom Penh	
24 August	National Costume Competition	The Union of Youth Federations of Cambodia, Phnom Penh	
25 August	Preliminary Competition	The Union of Youth Federations of Cambodia, Phnom Penh	
27 August	Grand Final Coronation	The Union of Youth Federations of Cambodia, Phnom Penh	

=== Selection of participants ===
Applications for Miss Grand Cambodia were accepted from 7 May to 15 July. The official press presentation for Miss Grand Cambodia 2022 was held on 25 July 2022. Miss Grand Cambodia this year for the first time, is officially allowing international countries to participate with debuting countries Canada, New Zealand, Thailand and Vietnam to participate whereas Australia, France and United States to return from the 2020 edition of Miss Grand Cambodia.

=== The crown ===
A new crown will be used to award the winner of the Miss Grand Cambodia pageant for the 2022 edition. The crown costs US$250,000 (KHR 1,019,513,000 ៛). Extra crowns will be awarded to the runners-up, but this time the runners up will be sent to other international pageants. The winner will be sent to Miss Grand International 2022, the 1st runner-up will be sent to Miss Earth 2022, the 2nd runner-up will be sent to Miss Global for 2023, the 3rd runner-up will be sent to Miss Interglobal for 2023 and the 4th runner-up will be sent to Miss Polo International for 2023.

== Results ==
=== Main placements ===
Miss Grand Cambodia 2022 competition result by province
Colors key
Winner	Third runner-up	Unplaced
First runner-up	Fourth runner-up	Did not participate
Second runner-up	Top 15

Final results	Contestant	
Miss Grand Cambodia 2022	Preah Sihanouk – Pich Votey saravady	5th runner up– Miss Grand International 2022
1st runner-up	Cambodian Vietnamese – Soriyan Hang §	
2nd runner-up	Battambang – Naly Lim	
3rd runner-up	Ratanakiri – Sreylin Keo	
4th runner-up	Cambodian Thais – Reaksa Rean	
Top 15	Kandal – Lisa Pov; Kampot – Kanika John; Kratié – Lychang Seng; Cambodian Canadians – Sithay Srean; Poipet – Sreypov Yi; Takéo – Sreynuch Eang; Tboung Khmum – Sokundavy Uch; Mondulkiri – Lymey Chao Sokhom; Siem Reap – Phattiya Phou; Svay Rieng – Sreynu Eeang	

§: The candidate won the Miss Popular Choice Award (online voting) and got direct entry into Top 15.

=== Special awards ===
Award	Candidate
Best evening gown
Winner	Cambodian Vietnamese – Soriyan Hang
Runners-up	Kandal – Lisa Pov; Preah Sihanouk – Saravady Pich Votey; Battambang – Naly Lim; Cambodian Thais – Reaksa Rean
Best Make up
Winner	Preah Sihanouk – Saravady Pich Votey
Runners-up	Battambang – Naly Lim; Kampong Chhnang – Vicheka Sa; Cambodian Vietnamese – Soriyan Hang; Kandal – Lisa Pov
Best National Contume
Winner	Mondulkiri – Lymey Chao Sokhom
Runners-up	Battambang – Naly Lim; Cambodian Vietnamese – Soriyan Hang; Kampong Cham – Ka Ny; Kampong Chhnang – Vicheka Sa; Kampong Thom – Naisim Ly; Kratié- Lychang Seng; Pailin – Elen Kit; Preah Sihanouk – Saravady Pich Votey; Svay Rieng – Sreynu Eeang

Award	Candidate
Miss Star International Cambodia	Takéo – Sreynuch Eang
Miss Healthy Skin	Cambodian Vietnamese – Soriyan Hang
Miss Friendship	Cambodian Australians – Serey Ke
Miss Popular	Cambodian Vietnamese – Soriyan Hang
Miss Charming	Bokor – Sotheara Kong
Miss Rising Star	Kampong Thom – Naisim Ly
Best in Swimsuit
Winner	Cambodian Canadians – Sithay Srean
Runners-up	Takéo – Sreynuch Eang; Battambang – Naly Lim; Poipet – Sreypov Yi; Preah Sihanouk – Saravady Pich Votey
Best Introduction
Winner	Mondulkiri – Lymey Chao Sokhom
Runners-up	Cambodian Canadians – Sithay Srean; Cambodian French – Sereyroth Sam; Cambodian Thais – Reaksa Rean; Cambodian Vietnamese – Soriyan Hang

== Candidates ==
35 contestants competed for the title.

Province / City / Country	Candidate	Age	Height	Placement
Banteay Meanchey	Sophin Phon	23	1.70 m (5 ft 7 in)	
Battambang	Naly Lim	20	1.75 m (5 ft 9 in)	2nd Runner-up
Bavet	Sreyley Phon	23	1.70 m (5 ft 7 in)	
Bokor	Sotheara Kong	20	1.70 m (5 ft 7 in)	
Cambodian communities in Australia	Serey Ke	25	1.70 m (5 ft 7 in)	
Cambodian communities in Canada	Sithay Srean	20	1.73 m (5 ft 8 in)	Top 15
Cambodian communities in France	Sereyroth Sam	27	1.70 m (5 ft 7 in)	
Cambodian communities in New Zealand	Sreymao Ly	21	1.70 m (5 ft 7 in)	
Cambodian communities in Thailand	Reaksa Rean	22	1.71 m (5 ft 7 1/2 in)	4th Runner-up
Cambodian communities in United States	Sreylis Seang	18	1.70 m (5 ft 7 in)	
Cambodian communities in Vietnam	Soriyan Hang	27	1.68 m (5 ft 6 in)	1st Runner-up
Kampong Cham	Ka Ny	23	1.73 m (5 ft 8 in)	
Kampong Chhnang	Vicheka Sa	18	1.78 m (5 ft 10 in)	
Kampong Speu	Sopheap Souern	21	1.70 m (5 ft 7 in)	
Kampong Thom	Naisim Ly^{[α]}	24	1.70 m (5 ft 7 in)	
Kampot	Kanika John	18	1.70 m (5 ft 7 in)	Top 15
Kandal	Lisa Pov	21	1.70 m (5 ft 7 in)	Top 15
Kep	Lanin Rin	22	1.70 m (5 ft 7 in)	
Koh Kong	Lyly Ngo	22	1.70 m (5 ft 7 in)	
Kratié	Lychang Seng	20	1.78 m (5 ft 10 in)	Top 15
Mondulkiri	Lymey Chao Sokhom	22	1.70 m (5 ft 7 in)	Top 15
Oddar Meanchey	Bopha So	18	1.70 m (5 ft 7 in)	
Pailin	Elen Kit	22	1.75 m (5 ft 9 in)	
Phnom Penh	Chetravatey Hout	27	1.70 m (5 ft 7 in)	
Poipet	Sreypov Yi	19	1.70 m (5 ft 7 in)	Top 15
Preah Vihear	Pisey Channa	20	1.78 m (5 ft 10 in)	
Prey Veng	Sreylin Phin	21	1.69 m (5 ft 6 1/2 in)	
Pursat	Sreyley Lon	18	1.70 m (5 ft 7 in)	
Ratanakiri	Sreylin Keo^{[β]}	27	1.76 m (5 ft 9 1/2 in)	3rd Runner-up
Siem Reap	Phattiya Phou	21	1.70 m (5 ft 7 in)	Top 15
Preah Sihanouk	Saravady Pich Votey^{[γ]}	23	1.75 m (5 ft 9 in)	Miss Grand Cambodia 2022
Stung Treng	Chanla Chheang	26	1.70 m (5 ft 7 in)	
Svay Rieng	Sreynu Eeang	24	1.70 m (5 ft 7 in)	Top 15
Takéo	Sreynuch Eang	21	1.74 m (5 ft 8 1/2 in)	Top 15
Tboung Khmum	Sokundavy Uch	22	1.68 m (5 ft 6 in)	Top 15
Note^α Previously 3rd Runner-up at Miss Cambodia 2016.^β Previously 2nd Runner-up at Miss Cambodia 2020.^γ Previously 1st Runner-up at Miss Cambodia 2020.
