= Makhali-Phâl =

French Cambodian poet and novelist (1908–1965)

Nelly-Pierrette Guesde (1908 – November 15, 1965), best known by her pen name Makhali-Phâl, was a French Cambodian poet and novelist.

== Biography ==
Nelly-Pierrette Guesde was born in 1908 in Phnom Penh, Cambodia, although by some accounts her birth year was 1898. She was the daughter of a Cambodian mother, Néang Mali, and a father who was a member of the French colonial administration, Pierre Mathieu Théodore Guesde. In her early childhood she received a Buddhist education, but her father then placed her in a convent, as he wanted to give her a Catholic education. At age seven, she left Cambodia to live in France, in Pau, with her paternal grandmother and grandfather, who by at least one account was the writer Jules Guesde.

When Guesde was 20 years old, she left Pau for Paris. A few years later, she published her first book of poetry, Cambodge, which was followed by Chant de Paix, "dedicated to the Khmer people." Both works received significant recognition, notably from such writers as Paul Claudel, Léopold Sédar Senghor, Francis de Miomandre, and others. She wrote under the pen name Makhali-Phâl, which reportedly referred to the sound made by the goddess Kali's plow.

Though her writing largely focused on the Cambodia of her youth, Guesde never returned to her birth country, and she did not speak Khmer as an adult. She never married, although she lived with a much older romantic partner until his death in 1957. She died in Pau in 1965.

== Critical reception ==
Makhali-Phâl is considered one of only a handful of important examples of Francophone Cambodian writers in this period. With the publication of her first two books of poetry, she gained recognition for both the formal quality of her writing and for establishing a dialogue between her two cultures, French and Cambodian, combining French symbolist literature with Khmer cultural tradition. Cultural touchstones such as the sacred sites of Angkor Wat frequently appear in her work. She sought out a readership in both Europe and Asia.

A 1940 article in the journal L'Echo annamite paid homage to Makhali-Phâl's writing on her Buddhist and Khmer culture: "Cambodge is a short poem in three parts. But it is enough to mark Makhali-Phâl as the greatest Buddhist poet of our day. ... The Khmer people, who have been silent for millennia, have suddenly found this child with a prophetic voice to tell the world of her miracle and her first faith."

Her first novel, La Favorite de dix ans, received positive critical reception for dealing with encounters between her different cultures; it was translated into English in 1942 as The Young Concubine, gaining a significant readership in the United States. It was followed by her book Narayana, ou Celui qui se meut sur les eaux, which won the Académie Française's Prix Lange in 1944.

Despite her early success, Makhali-Phâl's later novels sold poorly. Her final two books, L'Asie en flammes and L'Égyptienne, were published posthumously.

== Selected works ==
- Cambodge, 1933
- Chant de paix, 1937
- La Favorite de dix ans, 1940
- Narayana, ou Celui qui se meut sur les eaux, 1942
- Le Festin des vautours, 1946
- Le Roi d'Angkor, 1952
- Le Feu et l'amour, 1953
- Mémoires de Cléopâtre, 1956
- L'Asie en flammes, 1965
- L'Égyptienne: moi, Cléopâtre reine, 1979
