= Suong =

Suong សួង
- City
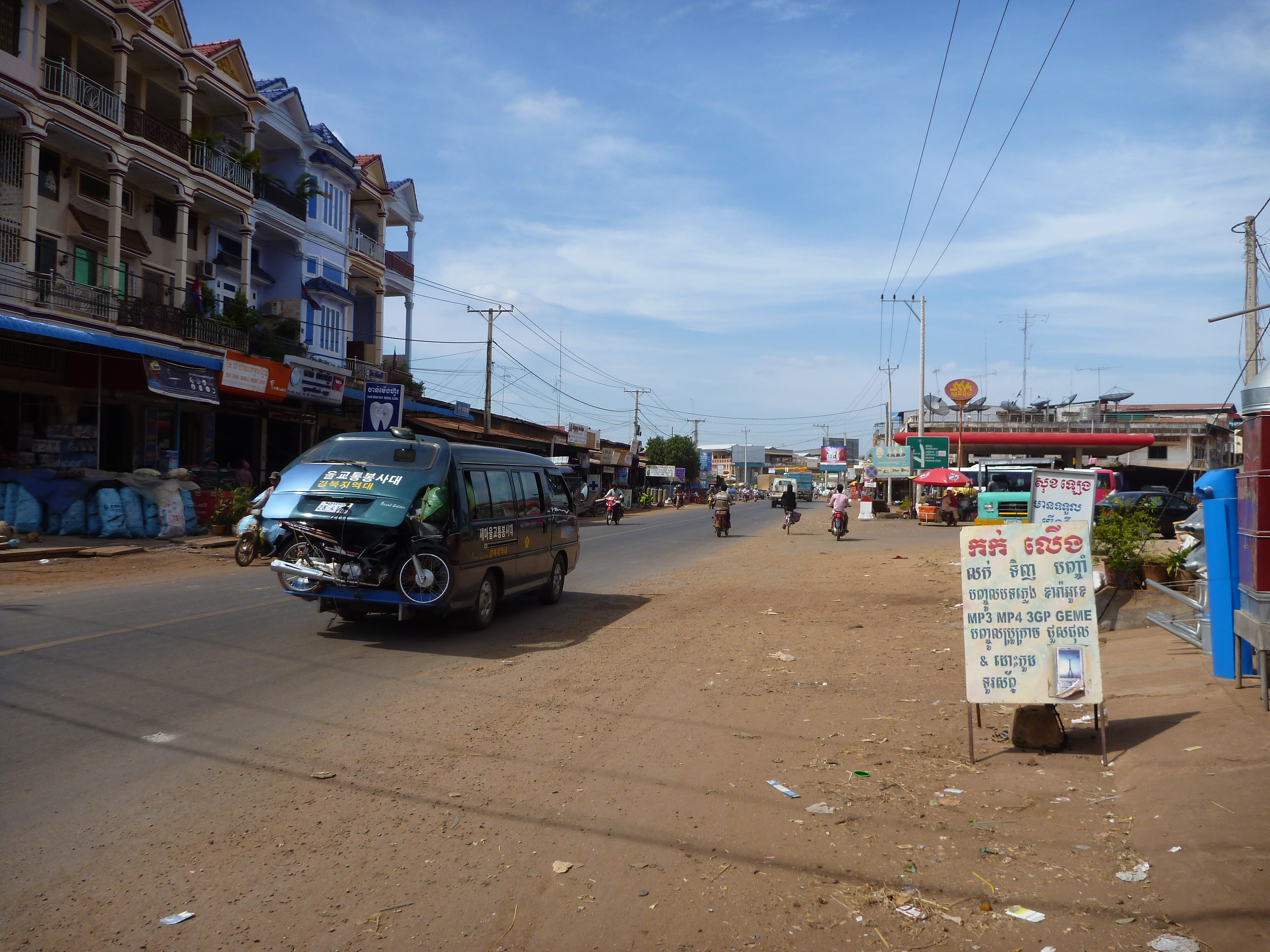

- Location in Cambodia
- Coordinates: 11°55′0″N 105°39′0″E
- Country: Cambodia
- Province: Tboung Khmum
- Municipality: Suong
- Elevation: 29 m (95 ft)

Population (2019)
  - Total: 35,054
- Time zone: UTC+7 (ICT)

Suong (Khmer: សួង, UNGEGN: Suŏng, ALA-LC: Suang [suəŋ]) is the capital and largest city of Tboung Khmum Province, Cambodia. It was part of Kampong Cham Province prior to its division in 2014.

In 2024, the city had a recorded population of roughly 30,000 people.

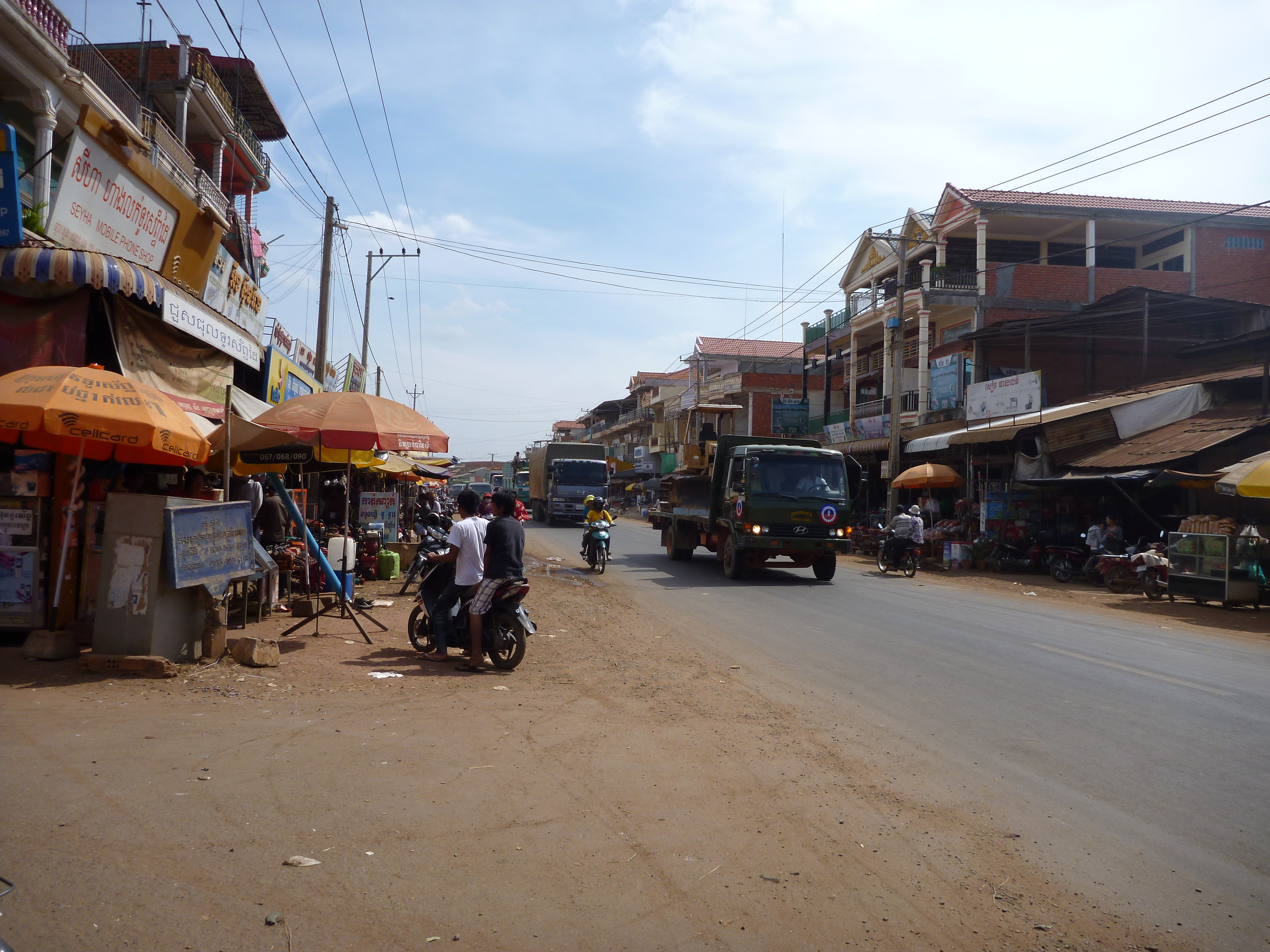
Suong City
