= Sandra Hill (footballer) =

Cambodian footballer

Personal information
- Date of birth: 16 June 1998 (age 28)
- Place of birth: Cambodia
- Height: 1.73 m (5 ft 8 in)
- Positions: Defender; forward

Team information
- Current team: Grand Canyon Antelopes
- Number: 13

College career
Years	Team	Apps	(Gls)
2017–	Grand Canyon Antelopes	60	(1)

International career^{‡}
2018	Cambodia	1+	(0+)
- ‡ National team caps and goals as of 24 June 2021

Sandra Hill (born 16 June 1998) is a Cambodian futsal player and a footballer who plays as a defender for American college team Grand Canyon Antelopes. She has been a member of the Cambodia women's national team.

== Early life ==
Hill was born in Cambodia to an Australian father and a Cambodian mother, Prak Chenda, a former player of the Cambodia women's national volleyball team and a sister of football manager and former player Prak Sovannara. She was raised in Canberra, Australia and attended Canberra College.

== International career ==
Hill capped for Cambodia at senior level during the 2018 AFF Women's Championship.
