= Cambodian Australians =

ជនជាតិខ្មែរអូស្ត្រាលី

Total population
- 57,096 (2021)

Regions with significant populations
- Victoria, New South Wales

Languages
- Khmer, Australian English, Cham, Teochew

Religion
- Theravada Buddhism, Catholicism

Related ethnic groups
- Khmers, Chinese Cambodians, Asian Australians

Cambodian Australians are Australian citizens who were born, raised in, or from Cambodia usually having Khmer ancestry but also including Chinese Cambodians, Vietnamese Cambodians, Chams and other ethnicities of Cambodia. The term also refers to Australians who have ancestors that were born, raised in, or from Cambodia. According to the 2021 Census, 57,096 claimed Khmer/Cambodian ancestry, with the largest population living in Victoria (23,498).

== History ==
People born in Cambodia as a percentage of the population in Sydney divided geographically by postal area.

Prior to 1970s most of the few Cambodians in Australia were children of upper income families or having government funded scholarships sent abroad to attend school. After the fall of Phnom Penh to the communist Khmer Rouge in 1975, a few Cambodians managed to escape, but not until the Khmer Rouge was overthrown in 1979 did large waves of Cambodians began immigrating to Australia as refugees.

In order to encourage rapid assimilation into Australian culture and to spread the economic impact, Australian government settled the 10,000 refugees in various towns and cities throughout the country.

However, once established enough to be able to communicate and travel, many Cambodians began migrating within Australia to certain localities where the climate was more like home, where they knew friends and relatives had been sent, or where there were rumored to be familiar jobs.

Consequently, large communities of Cambodians took root in major cities such as Sydney, Melbourne, Brisbane and Adelaide. The suburb of Springvale in Melbourne has a notably large Cambodian population.

== Notable people ==
- Sandra Hill (footballer) - footballer
- Hong Lim - politician
- Moulthun Ly - chess grandmaster
- Joseph Sua'ali'i - rugby footballer
- Meng Heang Tak - politician

== See also ==
- Asian Australians
- Diaspora studies
- Demographics of Cambodia
- Australia–Cambodia relations
