= Suong Municipality =

Suong Municipality ក្រុងសួង Krong Suong
- Municipality
- Location in Cambodia
- Coordinates: 11°54′40″N 105°51′15″E
- Country: Cambodia
- Province: Tboung Khmum
- Capital: Suong
- Elevation: 29 m (95 ft)

Population (2008)
  - Total: 29,761
- Time zone: UTC+07:00 (ICT)
- District Code: 2517

Suong (Khmer: សួង, lit. 'The Suong's Betel') is a municipality (krong) of Tboung Khmum Province in eastern Cambodia.

== Administration ==
Sangkat (quarters)	Phum (villages)
Suong	Cheung Lang; Chrak Poun; Chrey Bet Meas; Chong Angkrang; Phum Bei Dab; Phum Dabprambei; Phum Saeprambei; Ponnareay; Pou Kel; Prey Totueng; Suong Kaeut; Suong Lech; Thlok; Toung; Vihear Khpos
Vihear Luong	Cheung Voat; Chi Kae; Chruoy; Kandal; Kien Rung; Krachhan; Phum Prammuoy Dab; Phum Prammuoy Dabpir; Phum Pram Dab; Pnov; Prasrae Kraom; Prasrae Leu; Thmei; Thnal Thmei; Veal Char
