= Miss Grand Cambodia 2021 =

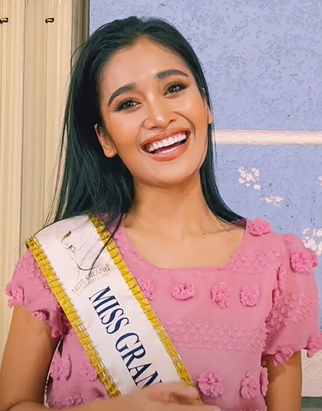
- Sothida Pokimtheng of Battambang, the winner of the contest
- Date: October 10, 2021
- Presenters: Moul Saravan
- Venue: AEON Mall, Sen Sok City, Phnom Penh
- Broadcaster: TV5; YouTube; Facebook Live
- Entrants: 25
- Placements: 10
- Winner: Sothida Pokimtheng (Battambang)
- Best National Costume: Em Kunthong (Preah Sihanouk)

External videos
- Miss Grand Cambodia 2021 Final Coronation Night, on October 9, 2021 (Part 1), YouTube video
- Miss Grand Cambodia 2021 Final Coronation Night, on October 10, 2021 (Part 2), Facebook video
- Miss Grand Cambodia 2021 Final Coronation Night, on October 10, 2021 (Part 3), Facebook video

Miss Grand Cambodia 2021 was the seventh edition of the Miss Grand Cambodia beauty pageant, held at the AEON Mall, Sen Sok City in Phnom Penh, on October 10, 2021. Twenty-five contestants, who qualified for the national contest through online screening, competed for the title, of whom a 23-year-old nursing student Miss City Tourism and Miss-Asia Pacific International Cambodia former from Battambang, Sothida Pokimtheng, was named the winner. She later represented Cambodia in the Miss Grand International 2021 held that year in Thailand on December 4, where she placed among the top 10 finalists and also won the Miss Popular Vote awards.

The final coronation event, originally scheduled for September 25, was broadcast live to the audience nationwide on the Royal Cambodian Armed Forces Television channel 5 (TV5).

== Result ==
=== Final placement ===
Miss Grand Cambodia 2021 competition result
Position	Delegate
Miss Grand Cambodia 2021	Battambang – Sothida Pokimtheng
1st runner-up	Kampong Cham – Leakena In
2nd runner-up	Preah Sihanouk – Em Kunthong
3rd runner-up	Kampot – Keo Senglyhour
4th runner-up	Kampong Chhnang – Sok Ratcharakorn
Top 10	Koh Kong – Phem Sreynor; Takéo – Phou Phattiya^{[α]}; Pailin – Lim Naly; Prey Veng – Pok Sreyleak; Preah Vihear – Va Malina

Note:

- ^α Automatically qualified for the top 10 after winning the fast track, Miss Popular vote.

=== Special awards ===
Miss Grand Cambodia 2021 special award winners
Award	Winner
Best National Costume	Preah Sihanouk – Em Kunthong
Best Introduction	Kratié – Lim Danin
Best in Swimsuit	Kampong Cham – In Leakhena
Best Evening Gown	Kampot – Keo Senglyhour
Best Make-up	Koh Kong – Phem Sreynor
Miss Popular	Takéo – Phou Phattiya
Miss Rising Star	Preah Vihear – Va Malina
Miss Charming	Kampong Thom – Ol Rina

== Contestants ==
Contestants from twenty-five provinces competed for the title of Miss Grand Cambodia 2021.

- Banteay Meanchey – Eam Phaya
- Battambang – Po Kimtheng Sothida (Winner)
- Kampong Cham – In Leakhena (1st Runner up)
- Kampong Chhnang – Sok Ratcharakorn (4th Runner up)
- Kampong Speu – Leng Chantha
- Kampong Thom – Ol Rina
- Kampot – Keo Senglyhour (3rd Runner up)
- Kandal – Vat Chenda
- Kep – Chhum Mengly
- Koh Kong – Phem Sreynor (Top 10)
- Kratié – Lim Danin
- Mondulkiri – Nhem Srey Tey
- Oddar Meanchey – Thon Panha
- Pailin – Lim Naly (Top 10)
- Phnom Penh – Sam Sereyroth
- Preah Vihear – Va Malina (Top 10)
- Prey Veng – Pok Sreyleak (Top 10)
- Pursat – Yun Navy
- Ratanakiri – Chhuon Malen
- Siem Reap – Bee Za
- Preah Sihanouk – Em Kun Thong (2nd Runner up)
- Stung Treng – Som Vayyey
- Svay Rieng – Yeang Sonita
- Takéo – Phou Phattiya (Top 10-Voted)
- Tboung Khmom – Srean Sithay
