= Miss Grand Cambodia 2023 =

9th edition of the Miss Grand Cambodia beauty pageant

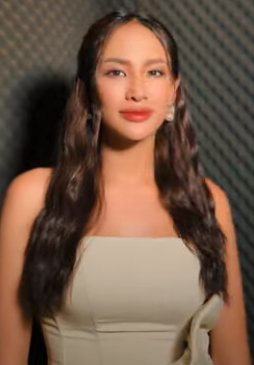
- Phoem Sreynor, the winner of the contest
- Date: August 19, 2023
- Presenters: Khat Sreychan; Mr. Summer
- Venue: Koh Pich Theatre, Phnom Penh
- Broadcaster: YouTube, PNN
- Entrants: 25
- Placements: 16
- Withdrawals: Australia; Bavet; Bokor; Canada; France; New Zealand; Poipet; Thailand (Surin); United States; Vietnam (Kampuchea Krom)
- Winner: Phoem Sreynor; Phnom Penh

Miss Grand Cambodia 2023 was the ninth edition of the Miss Grand Cambodia beauty pageant, held on 19 August 2023 in Koh Pich Theatre, Phnom Penh. Twenty-five candidates, who qualified for the national pageant through an online profile screening performed in April, competed for the title. At the end of the event, Pich Votey Saravody of Preah Sihanouk crowned Phoem Sreynor of Phnom Penh as her successor. Phoem Sreynor later represented Cambodia in Miss Grand International 2023, held in Vietnam on October 25, but was unplaced.

The event will be the first Miss Grand Cambodia competition organized by a Phnom Penh-based cosmetic products manufacturer and retailer company, HK 7 Co., Ltd., after purchasing the license from the international firm, MGI PLC, in late 2022.

== Background ==
After a cosmetic products company headed by Sokunthea Im, HK 7 Co., Ltd., took over the franchise of the Miss Grand Cambodia contest from Mohahang Production in late 2022, the press conference of the 2023 Miss Grand Cambodia competition was later arranged on February 1, 2023, at the AEON Mall Sen Sok City. and the application for such was opened on February 17. All submitted applicants were then screened by the pageant organizer to determine the final 25 national candidates. Each qualified candidate was later assigned to represent one of the 25 country's provinces; the sashing ceremony was conducted on May 21.

== Results ==
Miss Grand Cambodia 2023 competition result by province
Colors key
Winner	Fourth runner-up
First runner-up	Top 10
Second runner-up	Top 15
Third runner-up	Unplaced

Results	Candidates	International Placement
Miss Grand Cambodia 2023	Phnom Penh – Phoem Sreynor	Unplaced – Miss Grand International 2023
1st Runner Up	Kratié – Koy Anna	
2nd Runner Up	Pailin – In Leakena	Top 10 – Miss Cosmo 2024
3rd Runner Up	Kampong Thom – Sou Sreynit ‡	
4th Runner Up	Preah Sihanouk – Men Nong Nith	
Top 10	Tboung Khmum – Bun Leakhena; Battambang – Heng Kosin §; Mondulkiri – Rithy Somonea Morokoth; Siem Reap – John Kanika; Svay Rieng – Por Lina	
Top 16	Kandal – Ou Davy; Kampong Cham – Thy Kunthea; Kep – Sann Kesey; Takéo – Heng Kaknika; Prey Veng – Don Sreydet; Banteay Meanchey – Vat Chenda	
Sponsor award
Miss HK7	Svay Rieng - Por Lina	

§: The candidate won the Miss Popular Choice Award (online voting) and got direct entry into Top 10.
‡: The candidate won the Miss Grand Cambodia Choice of the Year (online voting) and got direct entry into Top 15.

== Candidates ==
Twenty-five candidates competed for the title of Miss Grand Cambodia 2023.

Province	Candidate		Hometown	Age	Height
Province	Romanized name	Khmer name	Hometown	Age	Height
Kandal	Ou Davy	អូ ដាវី	Phnom Penh	23	1.70 m (5 ft 7 in)
Kampong Cham	Thy Kunthea	ធី គន្ធា		22	1.72 m (5 ft 7 1/2 in)
Kampong Chhnang	Phat Sreynun	ផាត ស្រីនុន		23	1.70 m (5 ft 7 in)
Kampong Thom	Sou Sreynit	ស៊ូ ស្រីនីត	Phnom Penh	22	1.75 m (5 ft 9 in)
Kampong Speu	Touch Vorleak	ទូច វរលក្ខណ៍	Phnom Penh	18	1.68 m (5 ft 6 in)
Kampot	Som Sreymey	សំ ស្រីម៉ី		19	1.73 m (5 ft 8 in)
Kep	Sann Kesey	សាន់ កេសី	Kampong Chhnang	25	1.68 m (5 ft 6 in)
Koh Kong	Kong Nika Inthong	គង់ នីកាអុីនថង	Trat	26	1.77 m (5 ft 9 1/2 in)
Kratié	Koy Anna	កុយ អេនណា	Auckland	22	1.73 m (5 ft 8 in)
Takéo	Heng Kaknika	ហេង កនិកា	Tboung Khmum	21	1.65 m (5 ft 5 in)
Tboung Khmum	Bun Leakhena	ប៊ុន លក្ខិណា		27	1.68 m (5 ft 6 in)
Banteay Meanchey	Vat Chenda	វ៉ាត ចន្តា	Kandal	23	1.69 m (5 ft 6 1/2 in)
Battambang	Heng Kosin	ហេង កូសុីន	Phnom Penh	21	1.70 m (5 ft 7 in)
Pailin	In Leakena	អុិន លក្ខិណា	Siem Reap	21	1.78 m (5 ft 10 in)
Pursat	Ey Kim Sour	អុី គីមសួរ	Kandal	26	1.70 m (5 ft 7 in)
Prey Veng	Don Sreydet	ដន ស្រីដែត	Prey Veng	22	1.68 m (5 ft 6 in)
Preah Sihanouk	Men Nong Nith	ម៉ែន ណងនិត	Takéo	21	1.74 m (5 ft 8 1/2 in)
Preah Vihear	Maw Bounsakh Rangsey	ម៉ៅ ប៊ុនសក្ខ័រង្សី		22	1.70 m (5 ft 7 in)
Phnom Penh	Phoem Sreynor	ភឹម ស្រីនោ	Kampong Cham	25	1.70 m (5 ft 7 in)
Mondulkiri	Rithy Somonea Morokoth	រិទ្ធី សុមនាមរកត		23	1.75 m (5 ft 9 in)
Ratanakiri	Phoem Sokleng	ភឹម សុខឡេង	Phnom Penh	21	1.70 m (5 ft 7 in)
Siem Reap	John Kanika	ចន កានីកា	Phnom Penh	19	1.70 m (5 ft 7 in)
Stung Treng	Mov Sophan	ម៉ូវ សុផាន់	Prey Veng	23	1.70 m (5 ft 7 in)
Svay Rieng	Por Lina	ប៉ោ លីនណា		20	1.68 m (5 ft 6 in)
Oddar Meanchey	Len Aliza	លេន អាលីហ្សា		22	1.68 m (5 ft 6 in)

== Crossovers and returnees ==
Contestants who previously competed or will be competing at other beauty pageants:

=== National Pageants ===
Miss Grand Cambodia

- 2016: Bun Leakhena (1st runner-up)
- 2018: Phoem Sreyno (Top 15)
- 2021: In Leakena (1st runner-up) (as Kampong Cham)
- 2021: Phoem Sreyno (Top 11) (as Koh Kong)
- 2021: Vat Chenda (Top 11) (as Kandal)

Miss Cambodia

- 2020: Vat Chenda (N/A)

Miss Universe Cambodia

- 2019: In Leakena (Unplaced)
- 2022: Heng Kaknika (Unplaced)

Miss World Cambodia

- 2019: In Leakena (1st runner-up)

Miss Teen International Cambodia

- 2022: John Kanika (Unplaced)

=== International Pageants ===
Miss Supranational

- 2022: In Leakena (Unplaced)
