= Tboung Khmum province =

Province of Cambodia

Tboung Khmum Province ខេត្តត្បូងឃ្មុំ
- Province

Khmer transcription(s)
  - Khmer: ខេត្តត្បូងឃ្មុំ
  - UNGEGN: Khaet Tbong Khmŭm
  - ALA-LC: Khett Tpūng Khmuṃ
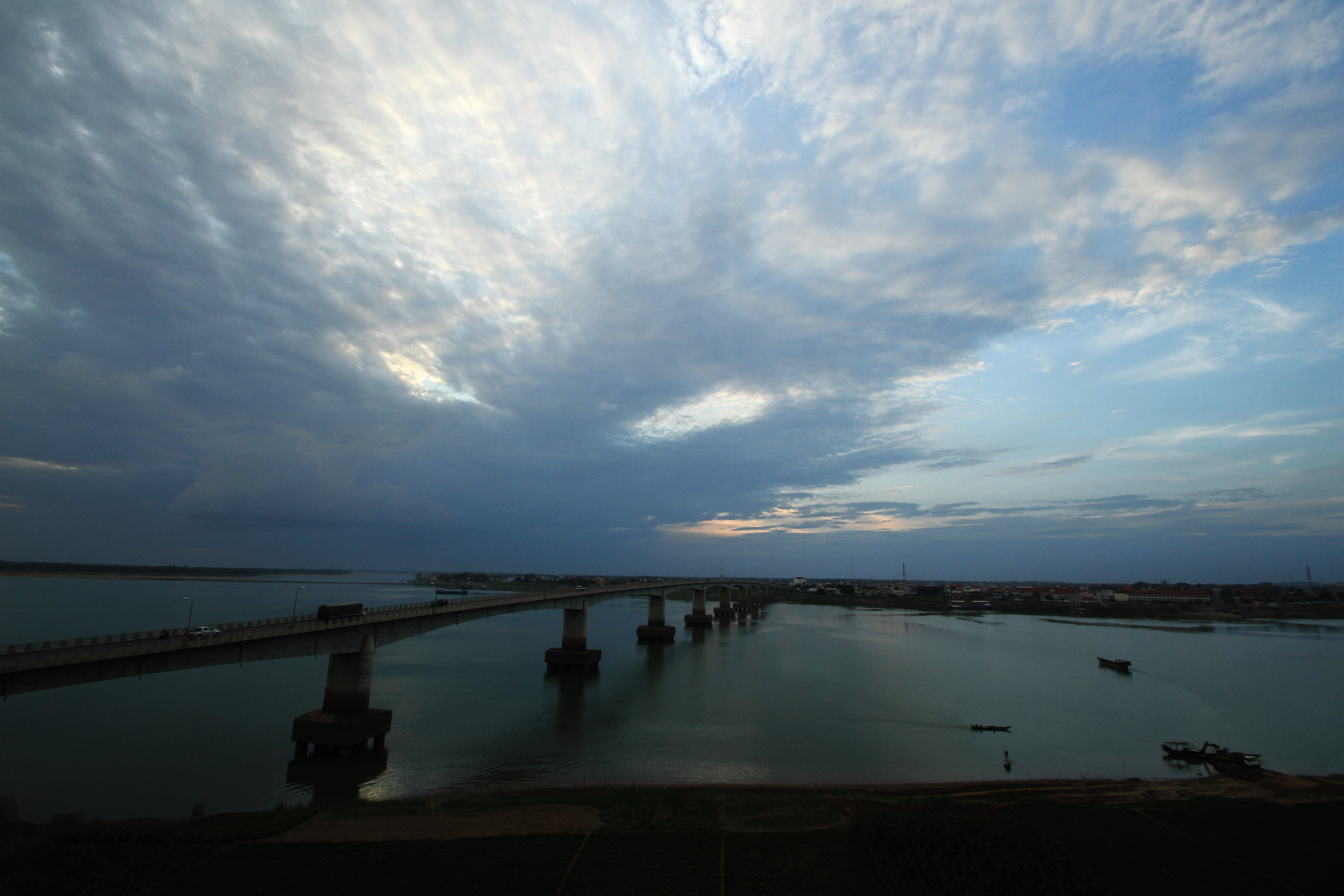
- Entering Tboung Khmum from Kampong Cham via the bridge over the Mekong

- Seal

- Map of Cambodia highlighting Tboung Khmum
- Coordinates: 11°59′N 105°27′E
- Country: Cambodia
- Founded: 1897
- Provincial status: 31 December 2013
- Capital: Suong

Government
  - Governor: Pen Kosal (CPP)
  - National Assembly: 8 / 125

Area
  - Total: 5,250 km^{2} (2,030 sq mi)
  - Rank: 15th

Population (2024)
  - Total: ▲889,970
  - Rank: 10th
  - Density: 148/km^{2} (380/sq mi)
  - Rank: 8th
- Time zone: UTC+7 (ICT)
- Dialing code: +855
- ISO 3166 code: KH-3
- Website: tboungkhmum.gov.kh

Tboung Khmum Province (Khmer: ខេត្តត្បូងឃ្មុំ, Khaet Tbong Khmŭm, [tɓoːŋ kʰmum]; lit. 'amber') is a province of the Kingdom of Cambodia, located on the central lowlands of the Mekong River. It borders the provinces of Kampong Cham to the west, Kratié to the north, Prey Veng to the south and shares an international border with Vietnam to the east. Its capital and largest city is Suong. The province's name consists of two Khmer words, tbong (Khmer: ត្បូង, "jewel") and khmŭm (Khmer: ឃ្មុំ, "bee"), which together mean "amber".

Tboung Khmum was created on 31 December 2013 by decree of King Norodom Sihamoni on Prime Minister Hun Sen's recommendation. Hun Sen requested the splitting in two of his home province Kampong Cham, on the pretext of improving administrative efficiency there, after his ruling Cambodian People's Party (CPP) won only eight of the available 18 National Assembly seats there in the July 2013 elections. After the split, 10 districts that remained in Kampong Cham overwhelmingly voted for the opposition Cambodia National Rescue Party, led by Sam Rainsy, while five of Tboung Khmum's six districts were won solidly by the CPP. The province has the highest percentage of Muslims in the country, at 11.8%. It also has the largest percentage of Cham people among other provinces, around 15%.

== Administration ==
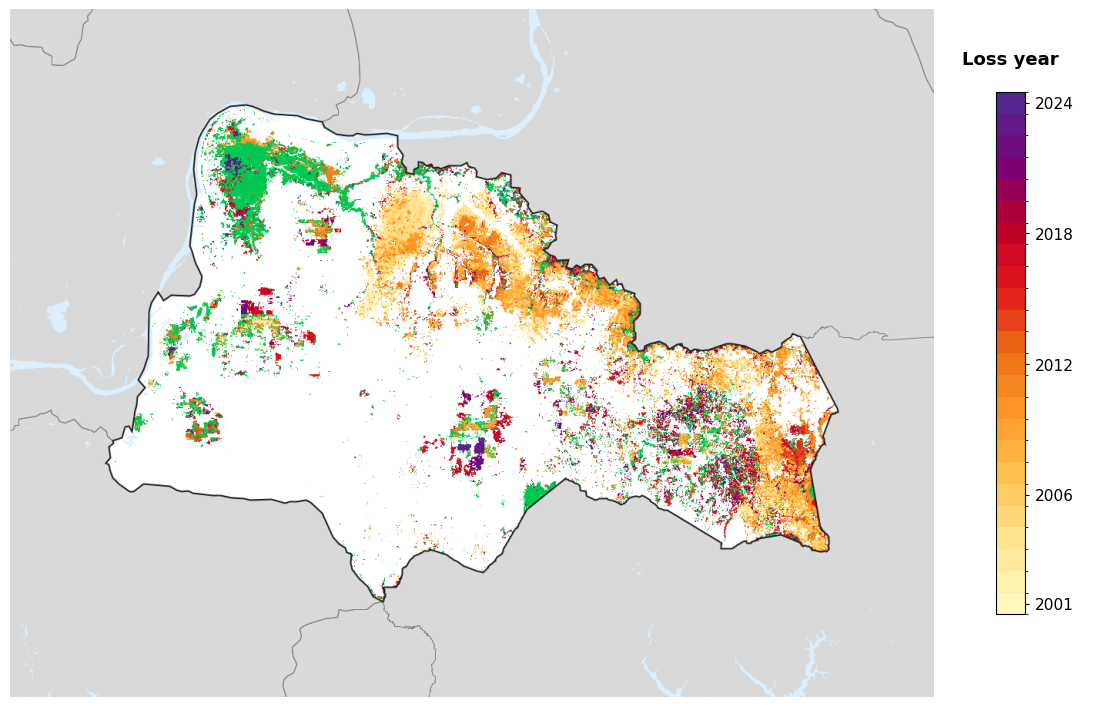
Tree-cover loss year in Tboung Khmum, 2001-2024, from the Global Forest Change dataset.

The province is subdivided into 6 districts and 1 municipality, further divided into 64 communes.

ISO code	District	Khmer
25-01	Dambae	ស្រុកតំបែរ
25-02	Krouch Chhmar	ស្រុកក្រូចឆ្មារ
25-03	Memot	ស្រុកមេមត់
25-04	Ou Reang Ov	ស្រុកអូររាំងឪ
25-05	Ponhea Kraek	ស្រុកពញាក្រែក
25-07	Tboung Khmum	ស្រុកត្បូងឃ្មុំ
25-06	Suong Municipality	ក្រុងសួង

== Religion ==
Religion in Tboung Khmum province (2019 census)
1. Buddhism (88.1%)
2. Islam (11.8%)
3. Christianity (0.10%)
4. Animism and Other religions (0.00%)

The state religion is Theravada Buddhism. More than 88.1% of the people in Tboung Khmum province are Buddhists. About 11.8% population of Tboung Khmum province follow Islam followed by Chams. Christianity is followed by 0.1% in the province. It's the most Muslim province of the country.

== See also ==
- Bun Rany, wife of Hun Sen (born in Krouch Chhmar District now located in Tboung Khmum province)
- Champa
- Kampong Cham province
