= Aanchal Kumar =

Indian actress and model (born 1979)

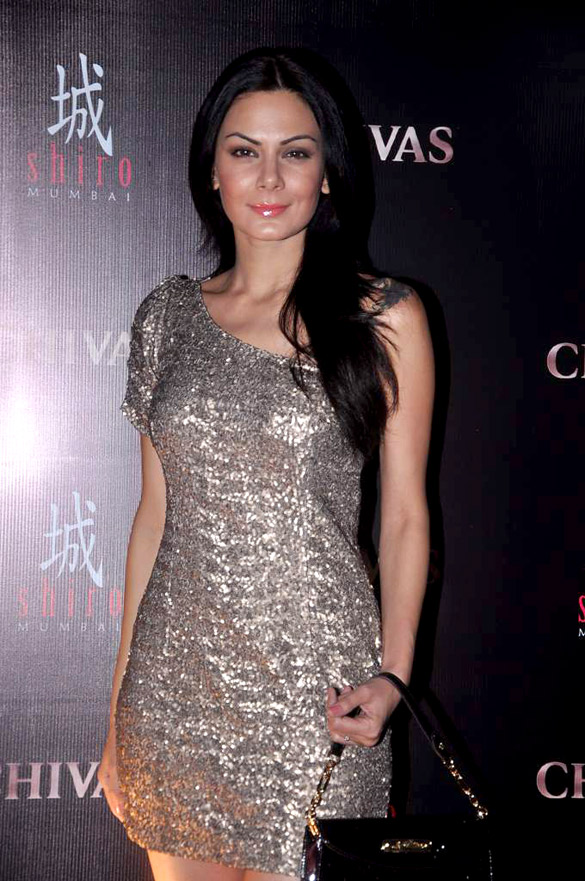
- Aanchal kumar chivas bash
- Born: 24 October 1979 (age 46); Chandigarh, India
- Education: St. Stephen's School; Mithibai College
- Occupations: Actress, Model
- Height: 1.72 m (5 ft 8 in)
- Spouse: Anupam Mittal (m. 2013)
- Children: 1
- Beauty pageant titleholder
- Title: Gladrags Megamodel 1999
- Major competitions: Gladrags Megamodel 1999; Miss Intercontinental (Semi-finalist)

Anchal Kumar is an Indian actress, model, and beauty pageant titleholder who won the Gladrags Manhunt and Megamodel Contest and represented India at Miss Intercontinental 1999. She has appeared in Hindi-language films including Fashion (2008) and Bluffmaster! (2005).

== Early life and education ==
Kumar was born on 24 October 1979 in Chandigarh, India. She attended St. Stephen's School in Chandigarh and later graduated from Mithibai College in Mumbai. She began her modelling career at the age of sixteen after being selected during a nationwide talent search conducted by Amitabh Bachchan Corporation.

== Career ==
Anchal began her career at the age of 17 with ad commercials and soon established herself as a model in the late 1990s and early 2000s. At 20, she won her first beauty pageant, the sixth Gladrags Manhunt and Megamodel Contest held in 1999. She went on to represent India at the international contest, the Miss Intercontinental pageant, which was held in Germany.

Since winning Gladrags 1999, Anchal continued modeling and also appeared in minor roles in many Hindi films, such as Fashion and Bluffmaster!. She represented several major brands, including Sunsilk and Bombay Dyeing. In 2007, she received the Best Female Model of the Year Award at the Bollywood Fashion & Music Awards held in Atlantic City, New Jersey.

She has appeared in numerous music videos, including Aaina, Mukhra Tumahra, Dupatta Tera Satrang Da, Back in Bed, and Blind and The Holy Rollers. Aanchal has appeared on TV shows, winning the celebrity segment of the quiz show Baazi Kiski on Zee TV. She has also appeared as a contestant on the Hindi reality show Bigg Boss 4 (2010), hosted by Salman Khan, where she remained for around six weeks.

== Personal life ==
Aanchal met Anupam Mittal, the founder and CEO of People Group and Shaadi.com, at an event. After dating for seven years, the couple married on 4 July 2013, in a ceremony in Jaipur. They have a daughter named Alyssa Mittal.

== Filmography ==
- Bluffmaster! (2005)
- Fashion (2008)

=== TV series ===
- Baazi Kiski
- Bigg Boss

=== Music videos ===
- Aaina
- Mukhra Tumahra
- Dupatta Tera Satrang Da
- Back in Bed and Blind
- The Holy Rollers

== Awards and nominations ==
Year	Award	Category	Result	Location	Ref
1999	Gladrags Manhunt and Megamodel Contest	Model of the Year	Won	Punjab	
1999	Miss Intercontinental		Semi-finalist	Germany	
2007	Bollywood Fashion & Music Awards	Best Female Model of the Year	Won	Atlantic City, New Jersey	
