= Gladrags Manhunt and Megamodel Contest =

Indian beauty pageant

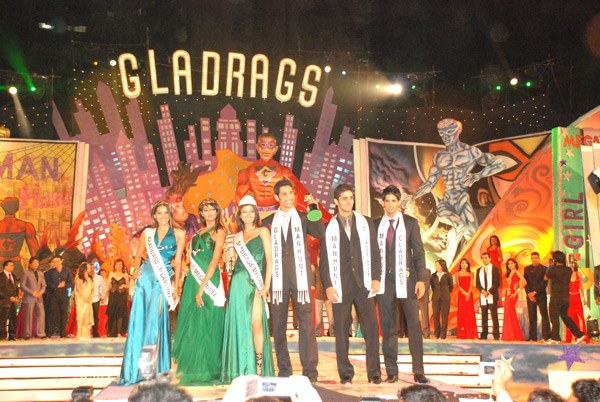
- 2008 contest winners
- Formation: 1994
- Founder: Maureen Wadia
- Purpose: Beauty pageant
- Headquarters: Mumbai
- Location: India
- Official language: Hindi, English
- President: Maureen Wadia
- Parent organisation: Gladrags India
- Affiliations: Manhunt International; Best Model of the World Miss Intercontinental; Miss Tourism International
- Website: www.gladrags.in

The Gladrags Manhunt and Megamodel Contest is an annual unisex pageant conducted by the Indian Gladrags magazine. The most appealing male and female models are selected and promoted by the magazine.

They first conduct a round of selection from the regions and then post all the elimination rounds for the final contestants. The group undergoes training including physical fitness, grooming, catwalk, diction and speech.

== Gladrags Manhunt Contest ==
=== History ===
The Gladrags Contest is an annual modeling event established in the early 1990s by Maureen Wadia, wife of industrialist Nusli Wadia, who owns Bombay Dyeing, one of India's oldest textile companies. Initially started to support Bombay Dyeing's promotional efforts, Maureen Wadia created the Gladrags magazine, which functioned both as a fashion publication and a men's magazine, featuring swimsuit images of models. The contest later expanded to include Mrs. India and Little Miss and Master contests.

The contest provided Bombay Dyeing with a source of models for its products, including bath and bed linens, while winners gained visibility that could launch careers in modeling or film. Unlike other beauty pageants, Gladrags contest was notable for its focus on the swimsuit round, with winners often featured on the magazine cover.

The first Gladrags Manhunt Contest India was held in 1994. Rajat Bedi of Punjab was the first winner. He represented India at Manhunt International 1994 held in Greece and was fourth runner up.

At the 2017 contest was held at the Mahalaxmi Racecourse in Mumbai In the Little Miss & Master India Pageant, Mishika Sonkar and Shaurya Saraswat won the juniors’ division, and Tithi Surti and Nikhil Chhabria won in the seniors’ category. Arni Sapkal won the Mrs. India Mumbai title, and Hina Azad and Bobby Vij were named winners of the Megamodel Manhunt Mumbai pageant.

=== International achievements ===
In 2001, Rajeev Singh of Rajasthan became the first Asian and Indian to win the Manhunt International contest. He also won two sub-awards at the contest including Sharmoon Best Dressed Gentleman Award and Best in National Costume.

India has produced many runners-up at the pageant, most notably Dino Morea, Zulfi Syed and John Abraham, all of whom have since established themselves in the Bollywood industry. The contest has also given India some of the finest models ever seen by Indian fashion industry like supermodel Muzamil Ibrahim, actor and model Sidharth Shukla, model Farhad Shahnawaz, actor and model Abhimanyu Jain, 4th runner up Manhunt International 2006 and Arry Dabas, semifinalist in 2012. Other notable winners include Romeo Gates, Ahran Chaudhary and Ravi Awana.

In 2005, Sidharth Shukla, runner-up of Gladrags Manhunt 2004, represented India at the Best Model Of The World contest held in Turkey and became the first Indian to win the title. Later Shukla became a model in India and starred in Bollywood films.

=== Winners of Gladrags Manhunt India ===
Year	Winner	State	Ref
1994	Kelly Dorji, Rishabh Loomba, Rajat Bedi	Punjab	
1995	Dino Morea	Karnataka	
1996-97	Zulfi Syed	Karnataka	
1998	Tarun Arora	Assam	
1999	John Abraham	Maharashtra	
2000	Regi Verghese	Hyderabad	
2001	Rajeev Singh	Rajasthan	
2002	Nitin Singh	Maharashtra	
2003	Muzamil Ibrahim	Jammu and Kashmir	
2004	Hrishant Goswami	New Delhi	
2005	Pawan Setpal	Maharashtra	
2006	Abhimanyu Jain	Rajasthan	
2007	Romeo Gates	London	
2008	Karan Ambardar	New Delhi	
2009	Prateek Balhara	Haryana	
2010	Aaran Chaudhary	Uttar Pradesh	
2011-12	Sam Kapoor	London, UK	
2013-14	Ravi Awana	Uttar Pradesh	
2016-17	Ansh Duggal	New Delhi	

=== Representatives to Manhunt International ===
- The winner of the Gladrags Manhunt represents India at Manhunt International, but if for any reason the winner is unable to compete then a runner up is sent to the pageant.

Year	Representative	State	Ranking	Special awards
1994	Rajat Bedi	Punjab	4th Runner Up	
1995	Dino Morea	Karnataka	1st Runner Up	
1997	Zulfi Syed	Karnataka	4th Runner Up	
1998	Balbir Meena	Rajasthan	Unplaced	
1999	John Abraham	Maharashtra	1st Runner Up	
2000	Regi Verghese	Hyderabad	Unplaced	
2001	Rajeev Singh	Rajasthan	Manhunt International 2001	Sharmoon Best Dressed Gentleman; Best National Costume
2002	Nitin Singh	Maharashtra	Top 15	
2005	Pawan Setpal	Maharashtra	Unplaced	Mr. Photogenic - 1st Runner Up
2006	Aryan Baruah		Top 15	Mister Personality - 2nd Runner Up
2007	Vivian Dsena	Ujjain	Top 10 Finalist	
2007	Abhimanyu Jain	Rajasthan	4th Runner Up	
2008	Romeo Gates	London	Top 15	Mister Internet Popularity
2010	Ahran Chaudhary	Uttar Pradesh	Top 16	Mister Internet Popularity
2011	Shashvath Seth	Maharashtra	Unplaced	
2012	Arry Dabas	Karnataka	Top 15	Mister Photogenic
2014	Gaurav Kumar	New Delhi		

=== Representatives to Best Model of the World ===
- The winner of the Gladrags Manhunt represents India at the Best Model of the World contest, but if for any reason the winner is unable to compete then a runner up is sent to the pageant.

Year	Representative	State	Ranking	Special awards	Ref.
2000	Shabbir Ali	Karnataka	Unplaced	Best Asian Model	
2001	Abhinav Gautam	Maharashtra	Unplaced	Best Asian Model	
2002	Vijay Balhara	Maharashtra	4th Runner Up	Best Gentleman	
2003	Ganesh Venkatraman	Maharashtra	Unplaced		
2005	Sidharth Shukla	Maharashtra	Best Model of the World		
2006	Abhimanyu Jain	Rajasthan	3rd Runner Up	Mister Photo-model	
2007	Romeo Gates	London	Unplaced		
2009	Prateek Balhara	Maharashtra	Unplaced		

=== Photographs of some notable winners of Gladrags Manhunt Contest ===
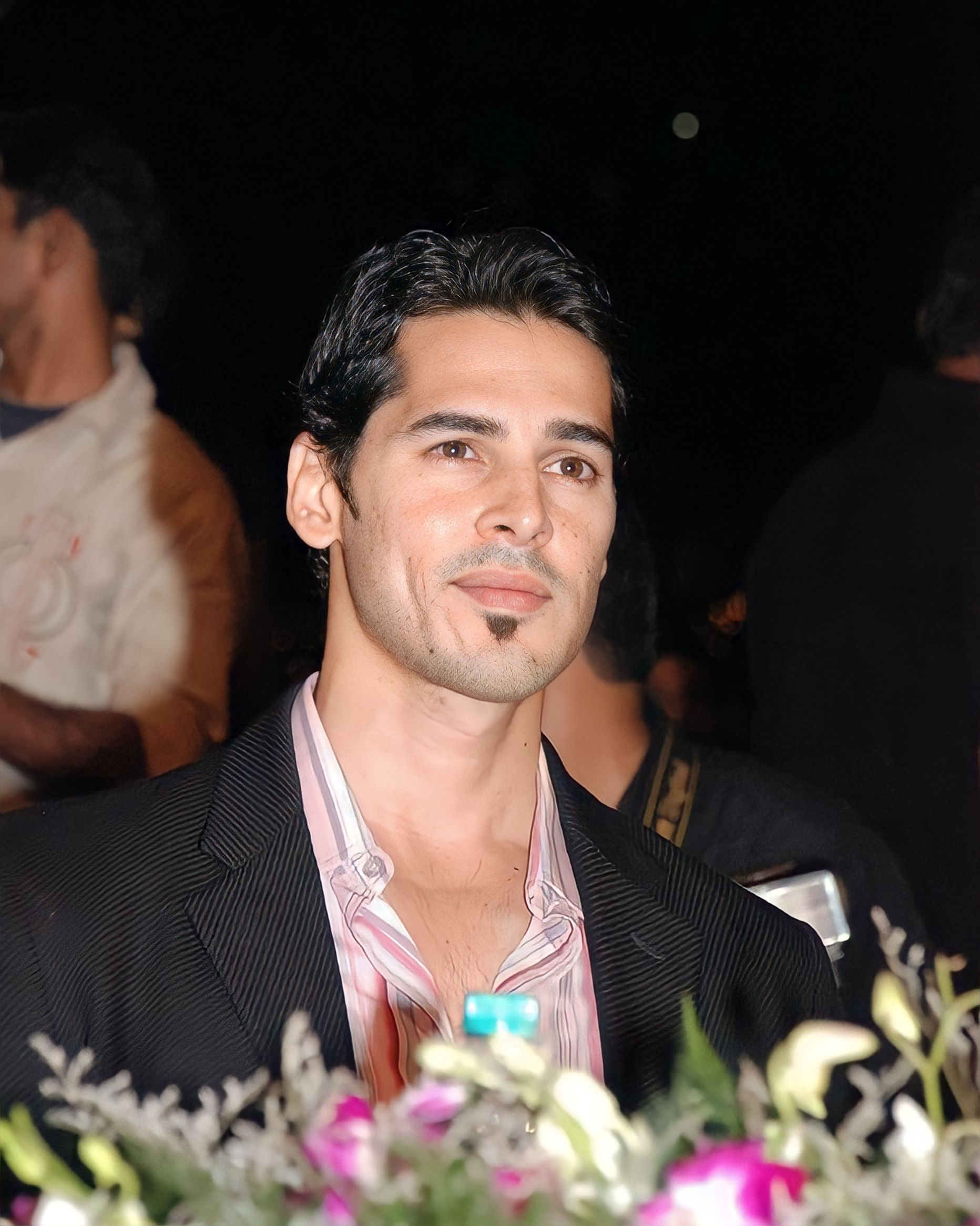
Dino Morea, Gladrags Manhunt India 1995 and Manhunt International 1995 - 1st Runner Up

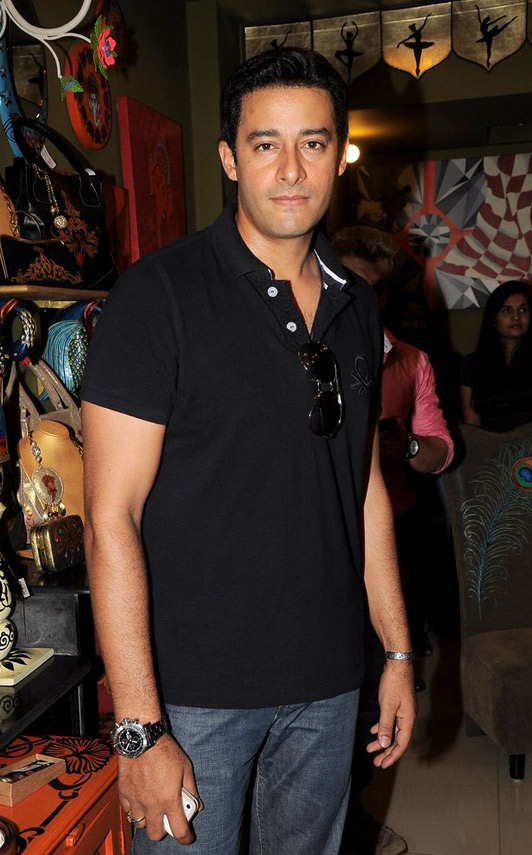
Zulfi Syed, Gladrags Mahnunt India 1996-97 and Manhunt International 1997 - 4th Runner Up

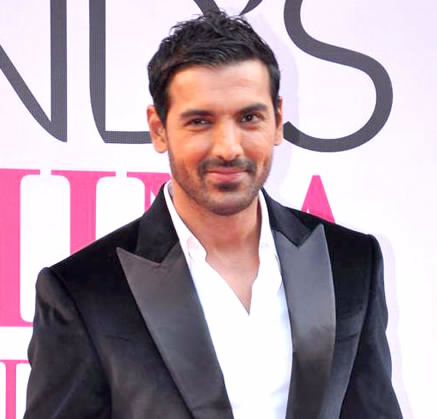
John Abraham, Gladrags Manhunt India 1999 and Manhunt International 1999 - 1st Runner Up

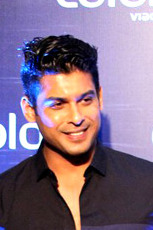
Sidharth Shukla, Best Model of the World 2005 and Gladrags Best Model 2004 runner-up

== Gladrags Mega model Contest ==
=== History ===
The first Mega model contest was held in 1994, and girls all across the country competed for the coveted title. Shweta Menon of Kerala was declared the winner.

Lara Dutta later established herself as a leading Bollywood actress.

=== Winners ===
year	Winner	Age	Height	State	Country	Ref
1994	Shweta Menon		1.69 m (5 ft 6 1/2 in)	Kerala	India	
1995	Lara Dutta	16	1.73 m (5 ft 8 in)	Karnataka	India	
1996	Aditi Gowitrikar	22	1.70 m (5 ft 7 in)	Maharashtra	India	
1997-98	Tora Khasigar	17	1.77 m (5 ft 9 1/2 in)	Assam	India	
1999	Aanchal Kumar	19	1.79 m (5 ft 10 1/2 in)	Punjab	India	
2000	Candice Pinto	19	1.78 m (5 ft 10 in)	Maharashtra	India	
2001	Koena Mitra	16	1.73 m (5 ft 8 in)	Maharashtra	India	
2002	Mugdha Godse	16	1.75 m (5 ft 9 in)	Maharashtra	India	
2003	Deepti Gujral	17	1.75 m (5 ft 9 in)	Maharashtra	India	
2004	Deepa Chari	19	1.75 m (5 ft 9 in)	Maharashtra	India	
2005	Niki D Souza	20	1.74 m (5 ft 8 1/2 in)	Maharashtra	India	
2006	Arti Sharma	23	1.74 m (5 ft 8 1/2 in)	Haryana	India	
2007	Mahima Chaudhary	17	1.73 m (5 ft 8 in)	Pune	India	
2008	Payal Tarafdar	20	1.71 m (5 ft 7 1/2 in)	Assam	India	
2009	Ankita Mohapatra	23	1.77 m (5 ft 9 1/2 in)	Odisha	India	
2010	Arshina Trivedi	21	1.80 m (5 ft 11 in)	London	United Kingdom	
2011-12	Sakshi Chaudhary	19	1.75 m (5 ft 9 in)	New Delhi	India	
2013-14	Charlotte Claire	23	1.74 m (5 ft 8 1/2 in)	Mumbai	India	
2015						
2016-17	Karuna Singh	20		Chandigarh	India	

=== Representatives to Miss Intercontinental ===
- The winner of Gladrags Mega model represented India at Miss Intercontinental from 1997 to 2003.
- Earlier Femina Teen Princess held the franchise of Miss Intercontinental pageant in India.
- From 2011, Indian Princess holds the franchise of Miss Intercontinental in India.

Year	Representative	State	Ranking	Special awards
1997	Lara Dutta	Karnataka	Miss Intercontinental 1997	
1998	Tora Khasigar	Assam	Unplaced	
1999	Aanchal Kumar	Punjab	Semi-finalist	
2001	Koena Mitra	Maharashtra	Top 12	
2002	Rakhee Chaudhary	Karnataka	Semi-finalist	
2003	Deepti Gujral	Maharashtra	3rd Runner Up	

=== Representatives to Miss Tourism International ===
- The winner of the Gladrags Mega model contest represented India at Miss Tourism International contest, but if for any reason the winner was unable to compete then a runner up was sent to the pageant.
- Earlier Femina Miss India held the franchise of Miss Tourism International pageant in India.
- From 2011 Indian Princess holds the franchise of Miss Tourism International in India.

Year	Representative	State	Ranking	Special awards
2001	Candice Pinto	Maharashtra	Miss Tourism International 2001	
2002	Tejinder Kaur	New Delhi	Unplaced	
2003	Deepa Chari	Maharashtra	Unplaced	
2004	Parul Chaudhry	Maharashtra	Unplaced	
2005	Shriya Singh	Punjab	2nd Runner Up	
2009	Anousha Chauhan	New Delhi	Unplaced	
2010	Mahima Chaudhary	Pune	Top 10	

=== Representatives to Miss Tourism Queen International ===
Year	Representative	State	Ranking	Special awards
2004	Zabina Khan	Maharashtra	Miss Tourism Queen International 2004	Miss Disco Queen; Miss Charm - 2nd Runner Up
2005	Neha Oberoi	Maharashtra	Unplaced	
2006	Rupali Suri	Maharashtra	Top 16	Miss Personality - 2nd Runner Up
2007	Mahima Chaudhary	Maharashtra	Top 16	Miss Personality; Best Evening Gown - 2nd Runner Up
2008	Devyani Mandavgane	Maharashtra	Unplaced	'Disco Queen

=== Representatives to Miss Tourism Queen of the Year International ===
Year	Representative	State	Ranking	Special awards
2005	Roopa Howaldar			
2004	Amanpreet Kaur Wahi	Punjab	Top 10 Semi-finalists	

=== Representatives to Best Model of the World ===
- The winner of the Gladrags Mega model contest represented India at Best Model of the World contest, but if for any reason the winner was unable to compete then a runner up was sent to the pageant.

Year	Representative	State	Ranking	Special awards
2000	Jacqueline D’souza	Karnataka	Unplaced	
2001	Zinobia Boocha	New Delhi	Unplaced	
2002	Mugdha Godse	Maharashtra	Unplaced	
2003	Deepa Chari	Maharashtra	Unplaced	
2006	Aarti Sharma	Haryana	Unplaced	
2007	Mahima Chaudhary	Maharashtra	Unplaced	Miss Friendship
2008	Payal Tarafdar	Assam	Unplaced	
2009	Ankita Mohapatra	Odisha	Unplaced	
