= Villu (film) =

- Theatrical release poster
- Directed by: Prabhu Deva
- Written by: A. C. Mugil; Rebel Ravi (dialogue)
- Screenplay by: Prabhu Deva
- Story by: A. C. Mugil; Rebel Ravi
- Based on: Soldier (Hindi)
- Produced by: K. Karunamoorthy; C. Arunpandian
- Starring: Vijay; Nayanthara
- Cinematography: Ravi Varman
- Edited by: Kola Bhaskar
- Music by: Devi Sri Prasad
- Production company: Ayngaran International
- Distributed by: Ayngaran International
- Release date: 12 January 2009
- Running time: 152 minutes
- Country: India
- Language: Tamil

Villu (transl. Bow) is a 2009 Indian Tamil-language action comedy film directed by Prabhu Deva and produced by Ayngaran International. The film stars Vijay in the main dual lead role as father and son alongside Nayanthara, Ranjitha, Prakash Raj, Vadivelu, Manoj K. Jayan, Devaraj, Anandaraj, and Sriman. Mumaith Khan, Zabyn Khan, and Khushbu appear as item numbers. It is a remake of the 1998 Hindi film Soldier. The film follows Pugazh, an undercover police officer, who avenges the death of his father who was an honest army officer falsely accused and killed by corrupt army officer. It was a hit at the box office

The film was officially announced in December 2007 under the initial title Pugazh, which was later changed to Singam, which was later changed to Vill after Deva received a copyright notice from Hari, which was soon after changed and finalised to be Villu after a negotiation with S. J. Suryah. Principal photography commenced in June 2008. It was sporadically in several legs, with filming locations including Palani, Karaikudi and Bangkok. The film has music composed by Devi Sri Prasad, cinematography handled by Ravi Varman and editing by Kola Bhaskar.

Villu was released worldwide on 12 January 2009 in the theatres to negative reviews from critics. Despite this, it was a success at the domestic box office. The film acquired #221 spot in 2009 at the United Kingdom box office and collected well overseas. Villu settled to an overall domestic profit of ₹50 lakhs.

Rediff pointed out that, Vadivelu and Vijay were applauded for their style of slap-stick humor in the film. Media outlets reported that, the film Villu became an successful domestic venture as Vijay and Vadivelu comic-timing was a graceful combination and the screenplay, dialogues and dubbing were extraordinary .

A re-edited comical 4K version of Villu with very less serious scenes was scheduled to re-release worldwide in theatres on June 21, 2024. Vadivelu's version of My name is Billa song will be included in the re-release.

== Plot ==
Pugazh "Villu" is an IITian and Oxford alumnus with a master's degree in chemical engineering. With the help of his relative Inspector Joseph, he succeeds in tracking down a wanted criminal named Raaka and trapping him to Joseph. The scene then shifts to a village, where Pugazh is attending the wedding of a Tahsildar's daughter. He meets Janavi, a friend of the bride, and instantly falls in love with her. After persistent wooing, he succeeds in winning her heart.

Janavi takes Pugazh to Munich (Germany) to introduce him to her father J. D., a wealthy businessman and covert arms smuggler. During his stay in Bern, he encounters J. D.'s gang, consisting of Shaan, a hotel pimp named Max, and another henchman. After initial confrontations with the three of them, he starts eliminating them one after another, and then J. D. becomes his remaining target. Janavi soon finds out that Pugazh is plotting to kill her father and warns Pugazh's mother about her son. On the contrary, Pugazh's mother not only knows and supports what Pugazh is doing, but she also reveals that she is not his real "mother" and tells her why Pugazh is after her father.

Pugazh's father Major Saravanan was a patriotic Indian Army officer. During a peacekeeping mission, he noticed J. D., Shaan, Raaka, and their two henchmen, who were then army officers working in his team, accepting money from terrorists in exchange for allowing them to carry out their activities. When he confronted them, they killed him and fabricated a story claiming that since he accepted money from terrorists to help them, they killed him considering the safety of the other soldiers and themselves. He was stripped posthumously of his titles honours, and badges. During his funeral, his family, consisting of his wife and a young Pugazh, were humiliated as the military withdrew his honours and the villagers banished them from their village. The villagers also barred Pugazh from performing his father's last rites and threw the dead body into a sand pit, where it got lost in a sand storm. The villagers, mainly through J.D. also brandish the forehead of Pugazh's mother with the title "wife of a traitor". She sends her son away with Shaan's estranged wife as she does not want him to grow up carrying the stigma of being the son of a disgraced army officer.

In the present day, J. D. takes Pugazh to India to retrieve a Blu-ray containing J. D.'s secret information, which Pugazh had earlier received from Shaan and given to Joseph. Pugazh soon finds out that Raaka has escaped. Pugazh manages to flee from J. D.'s and Raaka's clutches, and after a thrilling chase, he reaches an abandoned temple outside his village where he reunites with his mother, who had been living there since being banished from the village. J. D., Raaka and their henchmen arrive there. They kill Joseph, injure Pugazh and bury him alive. After a sandstorm unearths Pugazh, he wakes up kills Raaka and fights with J. D., weakening him. With all of the villagers assembled around the abandoned temple, Pugazh forces J. D. to reveal the truth about his father to them. After his confession, Pugazh kills J. D. in revenge for his father's death. With the truth about Saravanan finally revealed, the army reinstates his titles, honours, and badges and also returns his army badge and uniform to his widowed wife.

== Cast ==
- Vijay in a dual role as:
  - Major Saravanan (father)
  - Pugazh (son)
- Nayanthara as Janavi
- Ranjitha as Selvi, Saravanan's wife and Pugazh's mother
- Prakash Raj as Jai Dev "JD", Janavi's father who killed Saravanan
- Vadivelu as Maadaswamy "Maada", the audiographer
- Manoj K. Jayan as Inspector Joseph, Saravanan's relative
- Devaraj as Shaan, JD's friend who was involved in Saravanan's murder
- Adithya as Raaka
- Anandaraj as JD and Shaan's henchman
- Sriman as Max alias Gandy
- Geetha as Shaan's wife and Pugazh's adopted mother
- Vaiyapuri as Pugazh's friend
- Raj Kapoor as Village Head
- Dhamu as VJ
- Aarthi as Janavi's friend
- Jyothi as Jyothi, Janavi's friend
- Pandu as Jyothi's father
- T. P. Gajendran as Marriage Guest
- Kumarimuthu as Eyewitness
- Manobala as Cyclist (Deleted Scene)
- Mumaith Khan (special appearance in the song "Daddy Mummy")
- Zabyn Khan (special appearance in the song "Daddy Mummy")
- Khushbu (special appearance in the song "Rama Rama")
- FEFSI Vijayan (special appearance in the song "Jalsa")
- Ashok Raja (special appearance in the song "Rama Rama")
- Ravi Varman (special appearance in the song "Rama Rama")
- A. C. Mugil (special appearance in the song "Rama Rama")
- Sunil Babu (special appearance in the song "Rama Rama")
- Prabhu Deva (director and special appearance in the song "Rama Rama")

== Production ==
=== Development ===
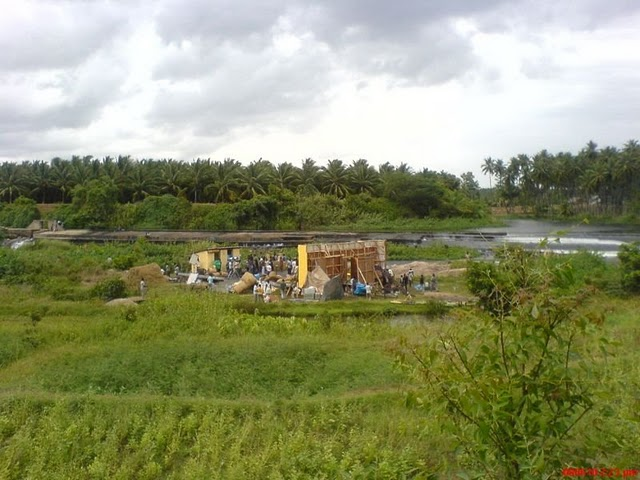
Villu crew shooting at Pollachi

Prabhu Deva along with announcing his venture in Bollywood titled Wanted Dead and Alive, which was the remake of Pokkiri, he launched his next Tamil venture in December 2007. Ayngaran International was to produce the film as well. The film was initially titled as Pugazh. Prabhu Deva later announced the titled to be Singam. However, a copyright issue was brought up concerning the title Singam, which was already announced as the title for a film by director Hari. Prabhu Deva then changed the titled to Vill, meaning "bow" in Tamil, a more formal spelling of Villu. The team later found out that S. J. Suryah was to use the title Vill for a Telugu film. Suryah, with the negotiation of Vijay, later changed his film's title. The title Villu subsequently became the film's official name.

=== Casting and filming ===
Nayanthara selected female role and Actress Ranjitha was selected to play Vijay's wife and mother. Director Prabhu Deva started shooting for Villu with the team's first location being Palani, Tamil Nadu. The team's second location was set to be in Karaikudi. Prabhu Deva had reportedly planned two song sequences to be shot in European countries. Another song sequence was shot in Bangkok, Thailand. Later, reports claimed that the film's script and story would deal with a majority of the film taking place in Italy. Prabhu Deva had reportedly planned two song sequences to be shot in European countries. In an interview with Prabhu Deva, a month prior to the film's release, Prabhu Deva stated the film will be a "Tamil version of a James Bond film." It was reported that Prakash Raj was missing from shooting when the crew was shooting the climax.

Devi Sri Prasad, Kola Bhaskar and Ravi Varman were confirmed the film's composer, editor, and cinematographer respectively while FEFSI Vijayan was chosen as the stunt coordinator.

Vijay was Prabhu Deva's initial choice for the lead role. Prabhu Deva trusted the actor, due to their widely known friendship, after their success with Pokkiri the previous year. However, several critics and media had dubious thoughts on the choice of Vijay as the lead role actor for the film. Some websites wondered if Villu would promote his career, or give him another average response, like his previous films Azhagiya Tamil Magan and Kuruvi, which proved to be average grossers at the box-office due to their weak storyline and screenplay. Nayantara was confirmed the film's lead actress upon the film's launch. Vadivelu was also confirmed for a supporting role. Earlier reports claimed that Biju Menon or Napoleon were to be given a supporting role, but later the role went to Manoj K. Jayan. Vaiyapuri, Khushbu, and Kovai Sarala were also said to be given roles in the film. However, Khushbu was later confirmed an item number appearance while Sarala was to sing a song in the film. Some scenes were shot at Kayamozhi village at Thiruchendur. A song and a fight sequence was shot at Tuticorin while other songs were shot at Bangkok, Malaysia and Switzerland.

== Music ==
Villu

Soundtrack album by Devi Sri Prasad
- Released: 14 December 2008
- Recorded: 2007–2008
- Genre: Feature film soundtrack
- Labels: Ayngaran Music; An Ak Audio; Think Music

Devi Sri Prasad chronology
King (2008)	Villu (2008)	Current (2009)

The soundtrack for this film was composed by Devi Sri Prasad. The audio was launched on 14 December 2008 at Hello FM radio station. Three of the songs, "Jalsa Jalsa", "Dheemthanakka Thillana", and "Daddy Mummy" had their beats reused from three Telugu songs DSP had previously composed: the eponymous song from Jalsa ,"Om Namaste Bolo" from Ready, and "Akalesthey" from Shankar Dada Zindabad respectively.

No.	Title	Lyrics	Singer(s)	Length
1.	"Hey Rama Rama" (introduction song, pictured on Vijay and Kushboo, Prabhu Deva)	Kabilan	Amal Raj, Kovai Sarala	04:43
2.	"Jalsa Jalsa" (pictured on Vijay and Nayantara)	Rohini	Baba Sehgal, Rita, Devi Sri Prasad	04:20
3.	"Are You Crazy" (pictured on Vijay and Nayantara)	Prabhu Deva, Akila, Ravi	Divya	00:46
4.	"Daddy Mummy" (item song, pictured on Vijay, Mumaith Khan and Zabyn Khan)	Viveka	Mamta Mohandas, Naveen Madhav	04:20
5.	"Dheemthanakka Thillana" (pictured on Vijay and Nayantara)	Snehan	Devi Sri Prasad, Divya	04:09
6.	"Jalsa Jalsa" (Remix)	Rohini	Devi Sri Prasad, Baba Sehgal, Rita	04:00
7.	"Nee Kobapattaal" (pictured on Vijay and Nayantara)	P. Vijay	Sagar	04:21
8.	"Vaada Maappilley" (pictured on Vijay, Nayantara and Vadivelu)	Kabilan	Tippu, Rita Thyagarajan, Vadivelu, Savitha Reddy	03:34

== Release ==
The satellite rights of the film were sold to Kalaignar TV. Villu had a limited Blu-ray DVD release in United Kingdom and Japan.

== Reception ==
This film was released on 12 January 2009, on the same day as Vijay's 2007 film Pokkiri which was also directed by Prabhu Deva. It received negative reviews from fans and critics. Behindwoods.com gave 4.5 on 5 and said "With tacky production values, shabby cinematography and amateurish direction Villu comes across as a more than two-hour long." while another website stated "On the whole, Vijay's Villu is an action-packed mass masala film for his ardent fans but with loose ends." Rediff reviewed the film "Leave your brains behind and prepare to enjoy the adventures of a Tamil James Bond." and rated 2.5/5. Ananda Vikatan rated the film 37 out of 100. Dinamalar wrote "Director Prabhu Deva, despite having such a thousand facilities, has messed up without giving a hit as much as Pokkiri. It is unfortunate that the bow that should be flown has become a slightly pushed model car". Kumudham praised the humour and music but panned the character design of antagonists and concluded calling Villu as bow which does not have arrow to drop fruit. Times of India wrote " But while director Prabhu Deva has weilded the bow well enough, he appears to have forgotten the arrow, and the film misses the bull's eye". Upperstall wrote "This awful rip-off from the Hindi film Soldier (1998), itself not a very good film, leaves you speechless considering the cast, technical crew and the money spent. Director Prabhu Deva, while making Villu, said he was attempting to make a James Bond film in Tamil. Well, barring a couple of thrills, Villu has neither the humour, style or sophistication nor the bevy of beauties one associates with the Bond films. It is plain rotten". The Hindu wrote "With an excellent team to bolster the proceedings, Prabhu Deva could have had a surefire potboiler provided he had worked more on the screenplay. The enigmas that remain unsolved can be ignored, but the treatment that gets trying towards the end, cannot". Sify wrote "What works in its favour is the star cast, packaging and look of the film. It is the most stylish Vijay film ever made. Villu is technically slick and moves at a rapid pace. The director, however, is less concerned with the film's plot and the pre-climax portion lacks punch as the story goes limp."
