= Ashutosh Rana =

Indian actor, poet and author (born 1967)

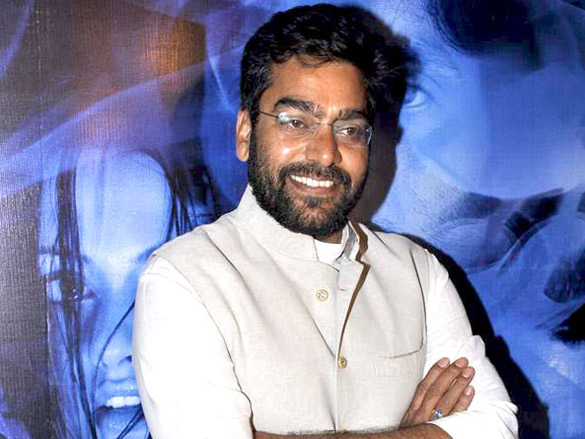
- Rana in 2011
- Born: Ashutosh Ramnarayan Neekhra; 10 November 1967 (age 59); Gadarwara, Madhya Pradesh, India
- Education: Dr. Hari Singh Gour University; National School of Drama
- Occupations: Actor; poet; television presenter; author; singer
- Spouse: Renuka Shahane (m. 2001)
- Children: 2

Ashutosh Ramnarayan Neekhra (born 10 November 1967), known professionally as Ashutosh Rana, is an Indian actor, poet, television presenter, author, and singer who works predominantly in Hindi films, in addition to Tamil, Telugu, and Kannada films. He is known for his portrayal of negative roles and has received several awards including a Filmfare OTT Award and two Filmfare Awards.

Besides his acting career, he is an author and philanthropist. Some books written by him include 'Maun Muskaan Ki Maar' and 'Ramrajya'.

== Early and personal life ==
Rana was born on 10 November 1967 in Gadarwara, Madhya Pradesh. He lived in Ahmedabad, Gujarat in his childhood. He graduated from the Dr. Hari Singh Gaur University of Sagar, Madhya Pradesh. He is the cousin of Rameshwar Neekhra, an Indian politician. He is married to actress Renuka Shahane.

== Career ==
=== Television ===
Rana appeared in the television serial Swabhimaan, which was followed by serials such as Farz, Sazish, Jax Kabhi, Waris. He anchored the TV show, Baazi Kiski. He has also hosted Sarkaar Ki Duniya, a reality show which took place on Mango Island in Karwar, Karnataka. In 2010, he featured in the Star Plus show Kaali- Ek Agnipariksha, where he played the negative role of Thakral.

=== Films ===
Rana received recognition for his negative role in Dushman, where he played a cold blooded psychopathic killer. Throughout his career, he has predominantly played negative and supporting roles. He has won two Filmfare Awards for Best Villain for his performances in Dushman and Sangharsh.

Apart from featuring in Hindi films, he has appeared in Tamil, Telugu and Kannada language films.

In 2021, he won the Filmfare OTT Award for Best Supporting Actor in a Web Original film for his performance as a grief-stricken father in Pagglait.

== Filmography ==
Key
†	Denotes films that have not yet been released

Year	Film	Role	Language	Notes
1993	Ashaant	–	Hindi	Bilingual film
1993	Ashaant	–	Kannada	Bilingual film
1996	Sanshodhan	Daaman Verma	Hindi	
1997	Tamanna	Haribhai	Hindi	
1997	Krishna Arjun	Billoo Singh	Hindi	
1998	Dushman	Gokul Pandit	Hindi	Won-Filmfare Award for Best Villian
1998	Ghulam	Agrawal Shyamsundar	Hindi	
1998	Zakhm	Subodh Malgaonkar	Hindi	
1999	Sangharsh	Lajja Shankar Pandey	Hindi	Won-Filmfare Award for Best Villian
1999	Jaanwar	Abdul Razi	Hindi	
2000	Laado	Inder	Haryanvi	
2000	Badal	DIG Jaisingh Rana	Hindi	
2000	Tarkieb	Major / Dr. Kamal Dogra	Hindi	
2001	Guru Mahaaguru	Gautam	Hindi	
2001	Kasoor	Inspector Ram Lokhande	Hindi	
2002	Raaz	Professor Agni Swaroop	Hindi	
2002	Ansh	Sukhdev Singh	Hindi	
2002	Danger	Nainesh	Hindi	
2002	Ab Ke Baras	Tejeshwar Singha	Hindi	
2002	Gunaah	Madhusudhan Gokhale	Hindi	
2002	Annarth	Raghav Kapoor	Hindi	
2002	Karz	Rajpal Thakur	Hindi	
2003	2 October	Karan Abhyankar	Hindi	
2003	Haasil	Gaurishankar Pandey	Hindi	
2003	Sandhya	Dr. Ajay Singhania	Hindi	
2003	LOC: Kargil	Yogendra Singh Yadav	Hindi	
2003	Dil Pardesi Ho Gayaa	Major Ram Brujpal	Hindi	
2004	Pardesi Re	Prabhakar Rao	Hindi	
2004	Venky	Yogendra Sharma IPS	Telugu	
2004	Chot- Aj Isko, Kal Tereko	Kishan Yadav	Hindi	
2004	Ab Tumhare Hawale Watan Sathiyo	Sikandar Khan	Hindi	
	Mission Mumbai		Hindi	
2005	Shabnam Mausi	Shabnam Bano	Hindi	
2005	Dil Ke Pechey Pechey	Vanraj Chauhan		
2005	Vishnu Sena	Badrinath	Kannada	
2005	Kalyug	Johnny Ranade	Hindi	
2006	Bangaram	Bhooma Reddy	Telugu	
2007	Kshana Kshana	Rana	Kannada	
2007	Awarapan	Bharat Daulat Malik	Hindi	
2007	Dhokha	Inspector Dev Singh	Hindi	
2008	Okka Magaadu	Chief Minister Namboodriyar	Telugu	
2008	Summer 2007	Dr. Mukesh Jadhav	Hindi	
2008	Victory	MLA K. Devaraj	Telugu	
2009	Coffee House	Kamal Kishore	Hindi	
2010	Ramayana: The Epic	Ravana	Hindi	Voiceover
2011	Monica	Chandrakant Pandit	Hindi	
2012	Vettai	Annachi	Tamil	
2012	Kismet Love Paisa Dilli	Kaptan Sahab	Hindi	
2012	Ata Pata Laapata	Satyaprakash Chaubey	Hindi	
2013	Zila Ghaziabad	Santosh Singh Rana	Hindi	
2013	Yeda	Appa Kulkarni (Yeda)	Marathi	
2013	Balupu	Vizag Poorna	Telugu	
2013	Tadakha	Bagga	Telugu	
2013	Mutthi Bhar Sapne	Ramakant Mishra	Hindi	
2013	Mahabharat	Dronacharya	Hindi	Voiceover
2014	Desi Kattey	Politician Amrish	Hindi	
2014	Humpty Sharma Ki Dulhania	Kamaljeet Pratap Singh	Hindi	
2014	Spark	Rana / Veera	Hindi	Dual role
2014	Meaghamann	Jothi Bhai	Tamil	
2015	Pataas	G. K.	Telugu	
2015	Ab Tak Chhappan 2	Inspector Suryakant Thorat	Hindi	
2015	Dirty Politics	Dayal Upadhyay	Hindi	
2015	Brothers	Pasha	Hindi	
2015	Black Home	Darshan "DK" Kumar	Hindi	
2015	Courier Boy Kalyan	Corrupt Doctor	Telugu	
2016	Krishnashtami		Telugu	
2016	Tamilselvanum Thaniyar Anjalum	Arun	Tamil	
2016	Shorgul	Vikram Chaudhary	Hindi	
2017	Jeena Isi Ka Naam Hai	Kunwar Vikram Singh	Hindi	
2017	Motta Shiva Ketta Shiva	G. K.	Tamil	
2017	Nene Raju Nene Mantri	Subbarayudu	Telugu	
2017	Aa Gaya Hero		Hindi	
2018	Jai Simha	Thota Rami Reddy	Telugu	
2018	Yeh Kaisa Tigam	Chhagan Patel	Hindi	
2018	Mulk	Public Prosecutor Santosh Anand	Hindi	
2018	Udanchhoo	Billu Kabootar	Hindi	
2018	Saakshyam	Munuswamy's second brother	Telugu	
2018	Dhadak	Ratan Singh Rathod	Hindi	
2018	Johnny	Ram	Tamil	
2018	Simmba	Head Constable Nityanand Mohile	Hindi	
2019	Sonchiriya	Virender Singh Gujjar	Hindi	
2019	Milan Talkies	Janardhan Panda	Hindi	
2019	Viswamitra	A. Rana	Telugu	
2019	Chicken Curry Law	Sitapati Shukla	Hindi	
2019	War	Colonel Sunil Luthra	Hindi	
2019	Kalki	Narsappa	Telugu	
2019	Sangathamizhan	Kulandaivel	Tamil	
2020	Bhoot – Part One: The Haunted Ship	Prof. Raghubir Joshi	Hindi	
2021	Pagglait	Shivendra Giri	Hindi	
2021	Hungama 2	Colonel Govind Kapoor	Hindi	
2021	Maaligai	King Vikramaditya	Tamil	
2022	Avatara Purusha	Darka	Kannada	
2022	Samrat Prithviraj	Jayachandra	Hindi	
2022	Rashtra Kavach Om	Colonel Jai Rathore	Hindi	
2023	Pathaan	Colonel Sunil Luthra	Hindi	
2023	Bheed	Inspector Subhash Yadav	Hindi	
2023	Darran Chhoo	Jugaadu	Hindi	
2023	Lakeerein	Dhudhari Singh	Hindi	
2023	Tiger 3	Colonel Sunil Luthra	Hindi	Cameo appearance
2024	Fighter	Abhijeet Rathore	Hindi	Special appearance
2024	Avatara Purusha 2	Darka	Kannada	
2025	Loveyapa	Atul Kumar Sharma	Hindi	
2025	Chhaava	Sarsenapati Hambirrao Mohite	Hindi	
2025	Kaushaljis vs Kaushal	Sahil Kaushal	Hindi	
2025	War 2	Colonel Sunil Luthra	Hindi	
2025	Heer Express	TJ	Hindi	
2026	One Two Cha Cha Chaa	Ved Prakash Jaiswal	Hindi	
2026	Krishnavataram Part 1: The Heart (Hridayam)	Narada Om	Hindi	Arjun Bhardwaj
2027	Dragon †	Dada Sarkar	Hindi	Telugu film; Filming
2027	NAVRUP	TBA	Odia	

=== Television ===
Year	Title	Role	Notes
1994	Tehkikaat	Shyam	Episode: "A Mystery Behind Sleep Walking Disorder"
1995	Swabhimaan	Tyagi	
1995	Aahat	Avinash	Uncredited role; Episodes: "The Closed Room", "Explosion"
1997–1999	Saturday Suspense	Inspector Raghuraj	
1998–2000	X-Zone		
1999	Waris		
2001	Farz		
2001	Baazi Kiski	Host	
2003	Kabhi Kabhie		
2009	Sarkaar Ki Duniya	Host	
2010	Kaali- Ek Agnipariksha	Keshav Thakral	
2019	Savdhaan India	Host	
2021	Chhatrasal	Aurangzeb	
2021	Aranyak	Mahadev Dogra	
2022	The Great Indian Murder	Jagganath Rai	
2022	Khakee: The Bihar Chapter	IG Mukteshwar Chaubey IPS	
2024	Ranneeti: Balakot & Beyond	Raqib Hamid Askani	
2024	Murder In Mahim	Peter Fernandes	
2024	The Mystery of Moksha Island	Viswak Sen	
2025	Chakravarti Samrat Prithviraj Chauhan	Chand Bardai	
2026	Glory	Viju Sangwan	

== Theatre ==
Ashutosh Rana returned to the stage in 2024 with the play Humare Ram. It is produced by Rahul Bhuchar under the banner of Felicity Theatre and directed by Gaurav Bhardwaj. The production has completed over 450 shows.

The play was staged in Dubai at the Dubai Opera. In 2026, it is scheduled for an international tour, including performances at the Eventim Apollo in London.

== Awards and nominations ==
=== Screen Awards ===
- Won - Screen Award for Best Actor in a Negative Role for Dushman

=== Zee Cine Awards ===
- Won - Best Performance in a Negative Role for Dushman
- Won - Best Performance in a Negative Role for Sangharsh

=== Filmfare Awards ===
- Won - Best Performance in a Negative Role for Dushman
- Won - Best Performance in a Negative Role for Sangharsh

=== South Indian International Movie Awards ===
- Nominated - SIIMA Award for Best Actor in a Negative Role (Telugu) for Tadakha

=== Filmfare OTT Awards ===
- Won - Best Supporting Actor in a Web Original Film for Pagglait

== Bibliography ==
- Rana, Ashutosh (2019). Maun Muskan Ki Maar. Prabhat Publication. p. 200. ISBN 978-9352669813.
- Rana, Ashutosh (2024). Ramrajya. Kautilya Books. p. 312. ISBN 978-9390885183.
