= Candice Pinto =

Indian beauty pageant titleholder (born 1981)

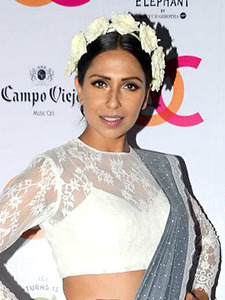
- Pinto in 2017
- Born: 12 March 1981 (age 45); Mumbai, India
- Citizenship: Indian
- Modeling information
- Height: 5 ft 8 in (1.73 m)
- Hair color: Black
- Eye color: Brown

Candice Pinto is an Indian beauty pageant titleholder who won the title of Miss Tourism International 2001. She is a regular at premier fashion events such as the Lakme Fashion Week and India Fashion Week and is seen on many Indian fashion magazine covers.

== Early life and education ==
Pinto was born in Mumbai, India into a Catholic family. One of her parents was from Goa, the other from Mangalore and she has three siblings. She attended Holy Cross High School in the Mumbai suburb of Kurla; and later graduated from South Indian Education Society (SIES) College in Sion, Mumbai, where she was awarded a master's degree in Economics.

She used to model in her college days along with her brother. Even though her family did not want her to pursue modelling initially, they helped her enter the Gladrags contest. After her graduation, she had fancied a career as an animator and has plans to take it up someday.

== Career ==
At 19, Pinto won her first beauty pageant, the seventh GladRags Mega Model contest held in March 2000. She went on to represent India at international contests such as the International Mega Model Contest and the Miss Intercontinental pageant which was held in Germany.

Since then, Pinto has been a regular sight at fashion events such as the Lakme Fashion Week and India Fashion Week; and is regularly seen on Indian fashion magazine covers.

Pinto finished in the top ten and won 'best body' at the Top Model of the World contest, held in Munich, Germany in 2001. The following year, she became the first Indian to be crowned Miss Tourism International in Malaysia. and Miss Fresh Face 2002. In 2020, she was recognized as Legendary Role Model by the Indian Fashion Awards.
