= FEF Global Fashion Awards =

Indian fashion industry awards

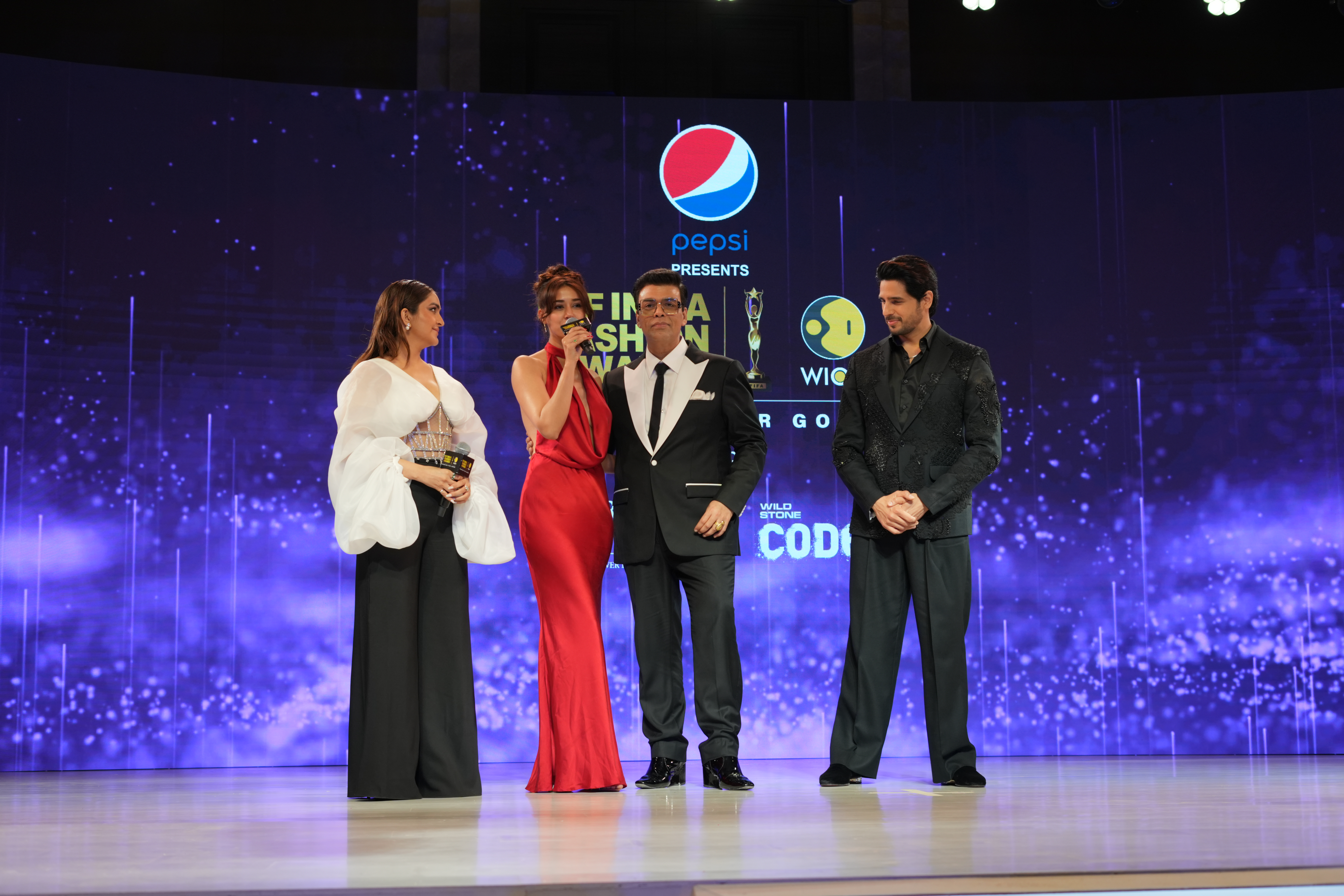
Disha Patani, Karan Johar & Sidharth Malhotra at the 4th edition of FEF IFA

FEF GFA honors fashion designers, models, photographers and every other tier of individual who contributes to the Indian fashion industry. The FEF India Fashion Awards was conceptualized by Talent Factory, founder - Sanjay Nigam, and Co-founder - Raj Sarthak Nigam to provide a platform for the fashion society, to support and honor the earnest professionals for the efforts and hard work, that they contributed in making the Indian fashion industry successful.

The first edition of FEF IFA was held in February 2020 in Delhi, in association with DLF Avenue. Politician Maneka Gandhi, businessman Ravi Kant Jaipuria, and designers Leena Singh and Rocky Star participated in the jury of FEF IFA 2020. The winner list includes: Candice Pinto in the category of Legendary Model; Rohit Bal, as Iconic Designer; Manish Malhotra was recognized as the label of the year and custom design; Gaurav Gupta received the award of Designer of the Year in Popular Choice; Shahnaz Husain received the trophy of the Torch Bearer of the Beauty Industry and the list goes on.

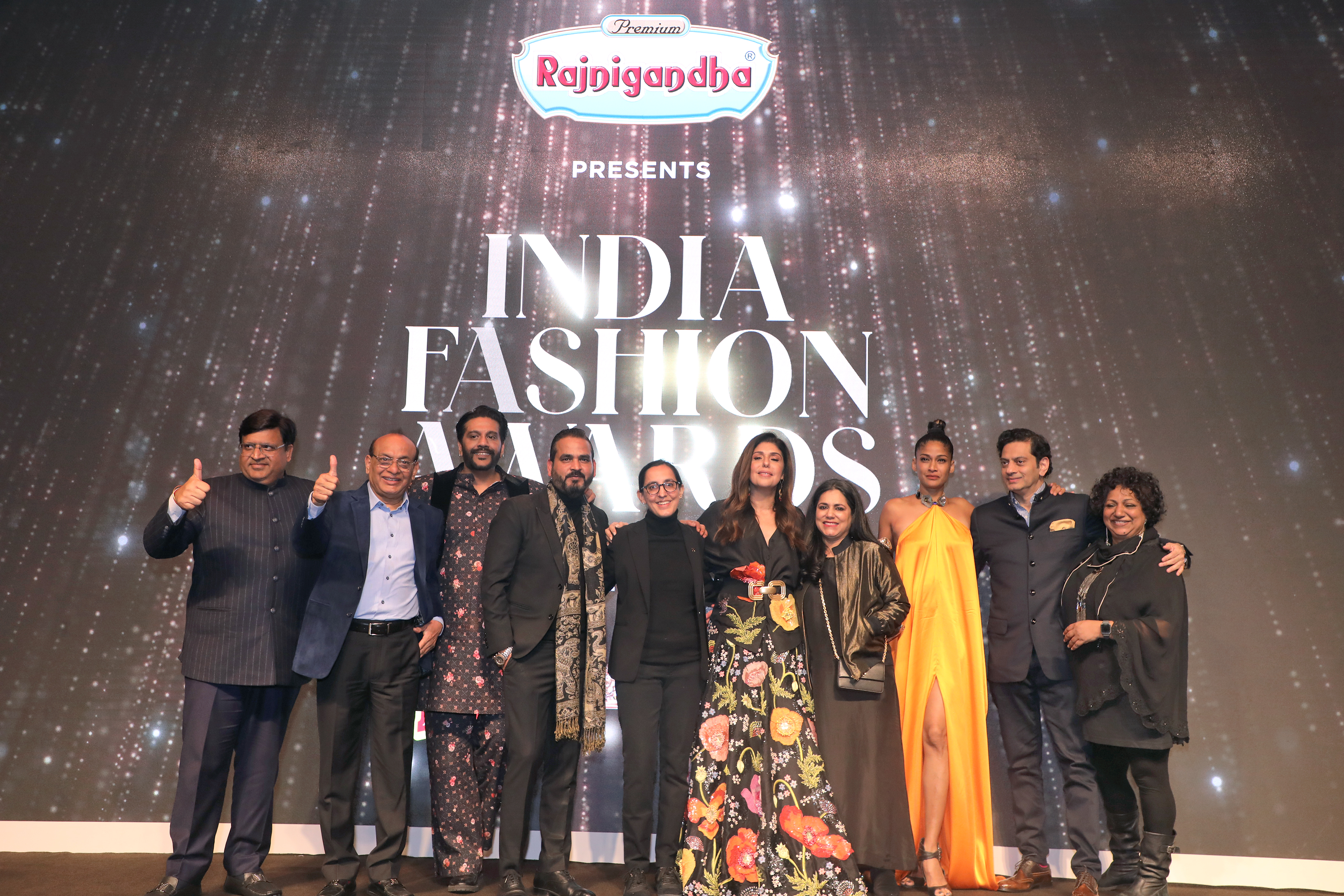
The Jury included Sanjay Nigam, Vagish Pathak, Dia Mirza, Raghavendra Rathore, Nikhil Kamath, Shalini Passi, Maneka Gandhi, Ambika Pillai, Kunal Rawal, Carol Gracias, Tarun Khiwal and Ravi Jaipuria and other stalwarts from fashion space.

The second edition of FEF IFA was held on 25 September 2021 to acknowledge, reward, and promote the efforts shown by the industry members between March 2020 and September 2021. It was hosted by Sunil Grover and Hussain Kuwajerwala and the winner's list includes the names of Miss Malini, Anamika Khanna, Nitibha Kaul, Raghav Chadha, Siddharth Tytler and so on.

== Awarded Categories ==
- Artisan Felicitation
- Emerging Model of the year
- Emerging Fashion Designer of the Year
- Leader of Sustainability
- Fashion Designer of the Year
- Fashion Trendsetter of the Year
- Show Director of the Year
- Face of the Year
- Fashion Influencer of the Year
- Fashion Stylist of the Year
- Fashion Photographer of the Year
- Makeup Artist of the Year
- Backstage Manager of the Year

== Past Award Winners ==
=== FEF India Fashion Awards 2020 ===
Winner	Award Category
Ritu Beri	Fashion Designer of the Year : International Fame
Shahnaz Husain	Torch Bearer of Beauty Industry
Masoom Minawala	Fashion Influencer of the Year
Rahul Jhangiani	Fashion Photographer of the Year
Prabh Uppal	Emerging Model of the Year
Aishwarya Sushmita	Emerging Face of the Year
Robin Raina	Fashionable Emerging Entrepreneur
Vahbiz Mehta	Emerging Show Director of the Year
Dayana Erappa	Face of the Year
Gaurav Raina	Music Director of the Year
Ambika Pillai	Makeup Artist of the Year
Gautam Kalra	Fashion Stylist of the Year
Rohit Bal	Iconic Fashion Designer of the Country: Jury Choice

and many more...

=== FEF India Fashion Awards 2021 ===
Winner	Award Category
Miss Malini	Female Digital Entrepreneur of the Year
Ramneek Pantal	Legendary super model
Vaishali S	Designer of the year – International Fame
Delnaz	Backstage Manager of the year
Taras Taraporvala	Fashion Photographer of the year
Anamika Khanna	Designer of the Year : Jury Choice
Tarun Khiwal	Legendary Photographer of the Country
Amit Aggarwal	Digital Fashion Film of the Year
Sahil Kochhar	Innovative Designer in Craft Techniques
Namrata Soni	Makeup Artist of the Year
Aparna Anisha	Show Director of the year
Conrad Sangma	Leader of Sustainability
Inega	Talent Management of the Year

and many more...

=== FEF India Fashion Awards 2022 ===
Winner	Award Category
Ambika Devi	Kuber- Outstanding Contribution in Art & Textiles
Dalavayi Kullayappa	Kuber- Outstanding Contribution in Art & Textiles
Krishna Kant Sharma (Chhotu Ji)	Kuber- Outstanding Contribution in Art & Textiles
Vankar Bhimji Kanji	Kuber- Outstanding Contribution in Art & Textiles
Shahidhusain Ansari	Kuber- Outstanding Contribution in Art & Textiles
Robert Naorem	Tea Valley-Regional Felicitation- North East
Kaifi Bharti founder Heights Group	Agency Of The Year For Retail Fashion Show Curation
Lloyd Bosco	Goldiee-Outstanding Performance in light & Sound
Gaurav Raina	Goldiee- Music Director of the Year
Delnaz Daruwala	Goldiee- Backstage Manager Of The Year
Aastha Sidanna	DLF- Special Recognition (Film & Television)
Prachi Raniwala	Fashion Writer of the Year
Archana - PR pundit	Artize-Fashion PR representative of the year
Abhishek Sharma; Vishal Chabbra; Swati Kapoor; Shivam Paathak; Sushant Abrol; Lovely Singh; Sukriti & Akriti	Vega FEF IFA SPOTLIGHT 2022
A- List	Vega - Influencer management agency of the year
Abhishek Singh	Mario- FEF IFA HALL OF FAME
Michael Cinco	Mario- FEF IFA HALL OF FAME
Lubna Adams	Pepsi - FEF IFA HALL OF FAME
Prasad Bidapa	Pepsi - FEF IFA HALL OF FAME
Robin Raina & Anchal Jain	Stylish Power Couple Of the year
Shaurya Athley	Vega - New Age Fashion Stylist Of The Year
Mohit Rai	Vega - Fashion Stylist Of The Year
Sasha Jairam	New Age Fashion Photographer Of The Year
Taras Tarporvala	Fashion Photographer Of The Year
Vahbiz Mehta & Lokesh Sharma	New Age Show Director Of The Year
Anu Ahuja	Show Director Of The Year
Purple Thoughts	FEF - Talent Management Agency Of the Year
Anjali Sivaraman	New Age Model Of The Year Ramp- Female
Rabanne Jamsandekar Victor	New Age Model Of the year Ramp- Male
Shimona Nath	New Age Model Of The Year Editorial
Vartika Singh	Model Of The Year Editorial
Prabh Uppal	Supermodel Of The Year - Ramp - Male
Alicia Kaur Uppal	Artize-Supermodel Of The Year - Ramp - Female
Sakshi Sindhwani	PCJ- Influential Model Of The Year
Avanti Nagrath	Model of the year- International Fame
Vijender Singh & Karman Kaur Thandi	FEF IFA Stylist Sportsperson
Amruta Fadnavis	DLF - Stylish Politician Of The Year
Darshan Mehta- Surbhi Negi	Rajnigandha - Business Leader of the year in Fashion
NIFT	Fashion & Design Institute of the Year
Bloni- Akshat Bansal	New Age Designer Of The Year
Gaurang Shah	Designer Of The Year - Handlooms & Textiles
Rohit & Rahul	Rajnigandha - Designer Of The Year - Men's Wear
Gaurav Gupta	Designer Of The Year - Bridal Wear Fusion
JJ Valaya	Designer Of The Year - Bridal Wear Indian
Anamika Khana	Designer Of The Year - Jury choice
Manish Malhotra	Rajnigandha - Designer Of The Year - Popular choice
