= Bluffmaster! =

2005 Indian film by Rohan Sippy

- Theatrical release poster
- Directed by: Rohan Sippy
- Written by: Shridhar Raghavan
- Dialogues by: Rajat Arora; Shridhar Raghavan
- Produced by: Ramesh Sippy
- Starring: Abhishek Bachchan; Ritesh Deshmukh; Priyanka Chopra; Sanjay Mishra; Boman Irani; Nana Patekar
- Cinematography: Himman Dhamija
- Edited by: Amitabh Shukla
- Music by: Songs: Vishal–Shekhar; Trickbaby; Sameer Uddin; Background Score: Sameer Uddin
- Production companies: Entertainment One; Ramesh Sippy Entertainment
- Distributed by: UTV Motion Pictures
- Release date: 16 December 2005
- Running time: 139 minutes
- Country: India
- Language: Hindi
- Budget: ₹10 crore
- Box office: ₹32.7 crore

Bluffmaster! is a 2005 Indian Hindi-language crime comedy film directed by Rohan Sippy and produced by Ramesh Sippy. The film stars Abhishek Bachchan, Riteish Deshmukh, Priyanka Chopra, Sanjay Mishra, Boman Irani and Nana Patekar. It is an adaptation of the 2000 Argentine film Nine Queens. It follows a conman who gets dumped by his girlfriend and after realising he is suffering from a severe illness, decides to help a new apprentice before dying. It is also inspired from 1997 film The Game.

Bluffmaster was released on 16 December 2005, and received mixed reviews from critics. The film was a box office success, becoming the 13th highest-grossing Bollywood film of 2005.

== Plot ==
Roy Kapoor (Abhishek Bachchan) is a conman, which information his girlfriend Simran 'Simmi' Ahuja (Priyanka Chopra) is not privy to. On the day of their engagement, however, Roy's true character is exposed, and Simmi leaves him. Consequently, Roy starts drinking heavily.

Six months later, Roy meets Aditya 'Dittu' Srivastav (Riteish Deshmukh) and Jassi (Sanjay Mishra), amateur conmen who attempt to con him but are unable to do so. They set their sights on a doctor, Dr. Bhalerao (Boman Irani), instead. Roy helps Bhalerao after he is conned, and Bhalerao feels greatly indebted to him.

One fateful day, Roy drinks too much and starts feeling dizzy. In the middle of the street, he falls unconscious and is saved by Dittu. Dittu begs Roy to teach him (Dittu) all he (Roy) knows about the art of conning. Roy reluctantly agrees, and the two start their escapades, conning everyone from a family to a "gang" who possess black money. Roy and Dittu decide to visit a club, where Roy starts feeling dizzy again. He again falls unconscious. Dittu then takes him to the hospital. Roy learns (via a CAT scan done by Dr. Bhalerao) that he has a brain tumor and will die within three months.

Simmi, meanwhile, works as a restaurant manager and is again engaged to be married to a man whom she doesn't love. Roy tries to tell her that he has a brain tumor. She eventually believes him – after meeting with the doctor – and they rekindle their friendship.

It is then revealed that Dittu's father and many others have been duped of their life savings by a man called Chandru (Nana Patekar), the main reason that Dittu became a conman in the first place. Roy decides that, before he dies, he'll help Dittu con Chandru of his stolen wealth. However, while planning the ultimate fraud, Roy's cancer enters its final stages.

Simmi is then kidnapped by Chandru, and Roy goes to rescue her. Roy is afterwards pushed by Chandru from the terrace of a building, only to survive because he falls on a huge, inflated square. Roy then goes for an MRI scan at the hospital, which is actually closed, to realise that he is well and that his cancer has been cured.

Roy goes home, only to find that everything that happened until then was staged, masterminded by Dittu, scripted by Chandru, and planned by Simmi. Almost everybody involved in the plan was duped by Roy, and the plan was to get him out of his wrong ways. Roy never had cancer; he thought he did because the scans were fake and drugs were sometimes added to Roy's drinks to make him feel those were symptoms of cancer. Roy then decides to mend his ways, and thus the film ends happily.

== Cast ==
- Abhishek Bachchan as Roy Kapoor
- Riteish Deshmukh as Aditya 'Dittu' Srivastav / Arjun Bajaj
- Priyanka Chopra as Simran 'Simi' Ahuja
- Sanjay Mishra as Jassi
- Nana Patekar as Chandrakant 'Chandru' Parekh / Shridhar
- Boman Irani as Dr. Vijay Bhalerao
- Tinnu Anand as Parimal Bajaj, Arjun's father
- Mahesh Thakur as I. L. Malhotra
- Supriya Pilgaonkar as Mrs. I. L. Malhotra
- Arash Labaf in a special appearance in song "Buro Buro"
- Sanjay Dutt as Himself (cameo appearance)
- Aanchal Kumar in a special appearance
- Carol Gracias in a special appearance

== Soundtrack ==
Bluffmaster!

Soundtrack album by Vishal–Shekhar
- Released: 20 November 2005 (India)
- Recorded: 2005
- Genre: Feature film soundtrack
- Length: 46:34
- Label: Saregama
- Producer: Vishal–Shekhar

The soundtrack was released on 20 November 2005. The background score was composed by Sameeruddin. According to the Indian trade website Box Office India, it was the tenth-highest-selling soundtrack album of that year, with around 1.4 million units sold.

=== Track listing ===
Bluffmaster! (Original Motion Picture Soundtrack)
No.	Title	Writer(s)	Singer	Length
1.	"Sabse Bada Rupaiyya"	Sameeruddin, Vishal-Shekhar	Mehmood, Chetan, Saira Hussain	4:09
2.	"Say Na Say Na"	Sameeruddin, Vishal-Shekhar	Aneela Mirza, Robert Uhlmann, Arash	3:16
3.	"Tadbeer Se Bigdi Hui Taqdeer (Destiny Mix)"	Sameeruddin, Vishal-Shekhar	Geeta Dutt	3:26
4.	"Right Here Right Now"	Sameeruddin, Vishal-Shekhar	Abhishek Bachchan, Sunidhi Chauhan	3:02
5.	"9 Parts of Desire"	Sameeruddin, Vishal-Shekhar	Trickbaby	3:48
6.	"The Gateway Theme"	Sameeruddin	Naveen Kumar, Jitendra	2:47
7.	"Boro Boro"	Sameeruddin, Vishal-Shekhar	Robert Uhlmarash	3:06
8.	"Do Aur Do Paanch"	Sameeruddin, Vishal-Shekhar	Kishore Kumar	4:29
9.	"Parde Ke Peechhe"	Sameeruddin, Vishal-Shekhar	Trickbaby	3:37
10.	"Come Fishing (Bluffmaster Theme)"	Sameeruddin, Vishal-Shekhar	Sameeruddin	2:42
11.	"Right Here Right Now (Hip-Hop Mix)"	Sameeruddin, Vishal-Shekhar	Abhishek Bachchan, Sunidhi Chauhan	3:44
12.	"Right Here Right Now (Dhol Mix)"	Sameeruddin, Vishal-Shekhar	Abhishek Bachchan, Sunidhi Chauhan	3:34

== Release ==
=== Reception ===
Bluffmaster received mixed reviews from critics.

BBC News gave the film 4 stars out of 5, appreciating the "cleverly-constructed" storyline, direction and performances by the supporting cast. Raja Sen from Rediff.com praised the film, noting the film's comedy, dialogue, tone and music as its major positives and calling it a feel-good style Matchstick Men (2003). However, film and trade analyst Taran Adarsh reacted negatively, giving the film 1.5 stars out of 5, praising several individualistic sequences, music, dialogue and cinematography but criticizing the romance track, and mainly the climax, which he compared to The Sixth Sense.

=== Box office ===
According to Box Office India, lifetime collection of the film is Rs. 327 million, and was thus declared a semi-hit at the box-office.

=== Home video ===
In August 2020, the film began streaming on Amazon Prime Video. It is also streaming on Netflix.
