= Leena Singh =

Indian fashion designer

Leena Singh is an Indian fashion designer. She is the owner of Ashima-Leena, an Indian luxury brand.

== Career ==
Leena Singh worked as a lawyer before turning to fashion design. She built the luxury brand Ashima-Leena with her sister-in-law, Ashima.

In 2010, she was the official designer for the Commonwealth Games 2010 held in New Delhi. In 2016, her label Ashima-Leena launched Fragrance of Persia, a collection inspired in Persians clothes. In 2018, Singh launched a couture collection called Khwabeeda in an event in Delhi, exploring contemporary and antique textile crafting weaves. In 2018, Leena Singh showcased a reversible shawl with the purpose of highlighting the artwork of weavers. In 2020, Leena Singh, with the fashion designer Rina Dhaka, supported an initiative to repurpose fashion waste into articles like masks, bed sheets, or pillow covers.

== Style ==
Leena Singh looks for designs that are both traditional and contemporary. She claims that good clothes can be an empowering tool for women. Her brand has pursued to recreate the sense of Mughal royalty.

== See also ==
- Indian clothing
- Fashion in India
- India Fashion Awards
