= Miss Tourism International =

International beauty pageant

- Type: International women's beauty pageant
- Parent organization: D'Touch International Sdn. Bhd.
- Headquarters: Kuala Lumpur, Malaysia
- First edition: 1994
- Most recent edition: 2025
- Current titleholder: Zuzanna Balonek; Poland
- President and owner: Tan Sri Datuk Danny Ooi
- Language: English
- Website: Official website

Miss Tourism International is an annual international beauty pageant run and owned by Malaysia–based D’Touch International Sdn. Bhd. Foundation.

The current Miss Tourism International is Zuzanna Balonek from Poland. She was crowned on October 18, 2025, at the Resorts World Genting, Genting Highlands, Bentong, Pahang, Malaysia.

== History ==
The Miss Tourism International is a pageant that plays host to many internationalism beauty Queens from around the world. The pageant was first held in 1994 at Kuching, Sarawak, where 24 contestants completed. In 2011, the pageant was live telecast on RTM1 and witnessed by thousands of relievers at Dataran Merdeka prior to the 2012 countdown.

Also in 2002, the first live internet broadcast of the event occurred. In 2022, the pageant was hosted again in Kuching, Sarawak for the second time. The pageant was held for 18 days from 11 to 28 November.

== Titleholders ==
Color keys

- Miss Tourism International
- Miss Tourism Queen of the Year International
- Miss Tourism Metropolitan International
- Miss Tourism Global
- Miss Tourism Cosmopolitan International
- Dreamgirl of the Year International
- Miss South East Asia Tourism Ambassadress
- Miss Intercontinental International (Former Titles)

Edition	Year	Miss Tourism International	Runners-Up				Special Awards		Date	Venue	Host country	Entrants	Ref.
Edition	Year	Miss Tourism International	First	Second	Third	Fourth	Fifth	Sixth	Date	Venue	Host country	Entrants	Ref.
1st	1994	Australia; Michelle Holmes	Malaysia; Emylia Abdul Hamid	South Korea; Jee Young-min	India; Barkha Madan	Philippines; Riza N. Martinez	Not awarded	Not awarded	6 May	Kuching, Sarawak	Malaysia	24	
2nd	1995	Greece; Maria Patelli	Malaysia; Lavinia Tan	United States; Kimberly Byers	Philippines; Sherilyne Uy Reyes	Costa Rica; Heidy Esquivel	Not awarded	Not awarded	24 March	Langkawi Island, Kedah	Malaysia	24	
3rd	1998	Poland; Roksana Jonek	Czech Republic; Gabriela Adamcova	Philippines; Mellany Gabat	Malaysia; Ooi Bee Bee	Honduras; Miriam Vivas Luna	Not awarded	Not awarded	30 March	Sunway Lagoon Resort Hotel, Bandar Sunway, Subang, Selangor	Malaysia	21	
4th	1999	Poland; Agnieszka Zakreta	Philippines; Raquel Uy	Finland; Ruut Kaangas	Thailand; Nirachala Kumya	Costa Rica; Nidia Jiménez	Not awarded	Not awarded	30 October	Sunway Lagoon Resort Hotel, Bandar Sunway, Subang, Selangor	Malaysia	21	
5th	2000	Philippines; Maria Esperanza Manzano	France; Maud Garnier	Venezuela; María Cristina López Palacios	Ukraine; Olesya Krakhmalyova	Spain; Lourdes Martinez	Not awarded	Not awarded	19 November	Sunway Lagoon Resort Hotel, Bandar Sunway, Subang, Selangor	Malaysia	17	
6th	2001	India; Candice Pinto	Czech Republic; Zuzana Stepanovska	Poland; Monika Gruda	China; Amy Yan Wei	Malaysia; Lyndel Soon	Not awarded	Not awarded	31 December	Sunway Lagoon Resort Hotel, Bandar Sunway, Subang, Selangor	Malaysia	26	
7th	2002	Thailand; Piyanuch Khamboon	China; Yin Zi	Turkey; Ebru Günzel	Bosnia and Herzegovina; Aida Osmanovic	Lebanon; Maha Hojeaj	Not awarded	Not awarded	31 December	Sunway Lagoon Resort Hotel, Bandar Sunway, Subang, Selangor	Malaysia	26	
8th	2003	South Africa; Angela Beck	Greece; Victoria Karyda	China; Xing Hui Yuan	Argentina; Laura Romero	Czech Republic; Zuzana Putnarova	Not awarded	Not awarded	31 December	Sunway Lagoon Resort Hotel, Bandar Sunway, Subang, Selangor	Malaysia	30	
9th	2004	United States; Megha Nabe	Ukraine; Marina Gorobets	Venezuela; María Gabriela Pérez Dellapía	China; Guan Shan Shan	Singapore; Ashikeen Abd Rahman	Not awarded	Not awarded	31 December	Sunway Lagoon Resort Hotel, Bandar Sunway, Subang, Selangor	Malaysia	33	
10th	2005	France; Isabelle Lamont	Taiwan; Chang Ta-Hsin	India; Shriya Singh	Greece; Maria-Madalena Ergati	Thailand; Porntip Prasertsong	Not awarded	Not awarded	31 December	Sunway Lagoon Resort Hotel, Bandar Sunway, Subang, Selangor	Malaysia	36	
11th	2006	Romania; Florina Manea	India; Tanya Vakil	France; Maud Tordjman	Mexico; Ana Maria González	Georgia; Nino Abashisze	Not awarded	Not awarded	12 November	Sunway Lagoon Resort Hotel, Bandar Sunway, Subang, Selangor	Malaysia	41	
12th	2008	India; Manasvi Mamgai	Brazil; Cristine Franczak	Bosnia and Herzegovina; Alma Mulalic	Thailand; Ananya Chinsangchai	Hong Kong; Ruby Wong	Not awarded	Not awarded	31 December	Sunway Lagoon Resort Hotel, Bandar Sunway, Subang, Selangor	Malaysia	45	
13th	2009	Germany; Sarah Elzanowski	Venezuela; Jéssica Carely Ibarra Petit	Brazil; Thays Calmany Neves	Malaysia; Edwina Marcus	Czech Republic; Gabriela Korinkova	Not awarded	Not awarded	31 December	Sunway Lagoon Resort Hotel, Bandar Sunway, Subang, Selangor	Malaysia	45	
14th	2010	Netherlands; Nathalie Den Dekker	Australia; Holly-Anne Visser	Venezuela; Stephany Andreína González Socorro	Philippines; Barbara Salvador	Mongolia; Borgoljin Bayarsaikhan	Not awarded	Not awarded	31 December	Sunway Lagoon Resort Hotel, Bandar Sunway, Subang, Selangor	Malaysia	55	
15th	2011	Malaysia; Aileen Gabriella Robinson	Panama; Carolina Del Carmen	Thailand; Patsaraporn Khonkhamhaeng	Singapore; Amanda Leong	Czech Republic; Jana Kopecka	Not awarded	Not awarded	31 December	Sunway Lagoon Resort Hotel, Bandar Sunway, Subang, Selangor	Malaysia	54	
16th	2012	Philippines; Rizzini Alexis Gomez †	Australia; Monika Radulovic	Venezuela; Marielis Alejandra Castellanos Pérez	Paraguay; Lourdes Maria del Carmen	Malaysia; Jun Yong Wan	Thailand; Suputra Chucharoen	Not awarded	31 December	Sunway Lagoon Resort Hotel, Bandar Sunway, Subang, Selangor	Malaysia	55	
17th	2013	Philippines; Angeli Dione Gomez	Thailand; Sunidporn Srisuwan	Australia; Sarah Czarnuch	Dominican Republic; Michelle Alexis Torres	Malaysia; Thaarah Ganesan	Vietnam; Phan Hoang Thu	Not awarded	31 December	Putrajaya Marriott Hotel, IOI Resort, Sepang Utara, Putrajaya	Malaysia	62	
18th	2014	Venezuela; Faddya Ysabel Halabi Troisi	Thailand; Warangkanang Wutthayakorn	Philippines; Glennifer Perido	Netherlands; Charina Bartels	China; Sun Wen Cong	Vietnam; Nguyen Dieu Linh	Not awarded	31 December	Putrajaya Marriott Hotel, IOI Resort, Sepang Utara, Putrajaya	Malaysia	60	
19th	2016	New Zealand; Ariel Pearse	Brazil; Thaina Magalhaes	Australia; Tasha Ross	Mexico; Ximena Delgado	Indonesia; Dikna Faradiba	Not awarded	Not awarded	31 December	Putrajaya Marriott Hotel, IOI Resort, Sepang Utara, Putrajaya	Malaysia	46	
20th	2017	Philippines; Jannie Loudette Alipo-on	Poland; Maja Sieron	Indonesia; Lois Tangel	Brazil; Julia Horta	Australia; Diana Hills	Thailand; Panghom Kamalrut	Not awarded	6 December	Johor Bahru, Johor	Malaysia	49	
21st	2018	Indonesia; Astari Indah Vernideani	Kenya; Sarah Chebet Pkyach	Australia; Sandra Callahan	Latvia; Laura Skutene	Philippines; Julieane Fernandez	Malaysia; Caenne Ng	Not awarded	21 December	Sunway Resort Hotel & Spa, Bandar Sunway, Selangor	Malaysia	45	
22nd	2019	Philippines; Cyrille Payumo	Indonesia; Gabriella Mandolang	Ukraine; Kateryna Kachashvili	Poland; Joanna Babynko	Cambodia; Sotima John	Thailand; Chompoonut Phungphon	Not awarded	8 November	Sunway Resort Hotel & Spa, Bandar Sunway, Selangor	Malaysia	39	
23rd	2020	Brazil; Maria Balicki Vinharski	Thailand; Patchaploy Rueandaluang	Indonesia; Clarita Mawarni Salem	Czech Republic; Tereza Bohuslavova	Australia; Kate Moore	Bolivia; Luz Elva Claros Gallardo	Malaysia; Lim Sue Anne	17 January 2021	Virtual Pageant	Virtual Pageant	31	
24th	2021	Indonesia; Jessy Silana Wongsodiharjo	Finland; Lily Anni Sofia Korpela	Vietnam; Hoang Thi Huong Ly	Nigeria; Toluwalope Olarewaju	Malaysia; How Zoe Ee	Paraguay; Araceli Dominguez	Philippines; Keinth Jensen Petrasanta	19 December	Virtual Pageant	Virtual Pageant	44	
25th	2022	Thailand; Suphatra Kliangprom	Venezuela; Laura Virginia Zabaleta Casado	Philippines; Maria Angelica Pantaliano	Singapore; Crystal Huang Ruojia	United States; Alysa Cook	New Zealand; Abigail Curd	Malaysia; Phoebe Ong Yi Huui	25 November	Raia Hotel & Convention Centre, Kuching, Sarawak	Malaysia	40	
26th	2023	Thailand; Tia Li Taveepanichpan	United Kingdom; Emily Cossey	Philippines; Jeanette Reyes	Malaysia; Jen Cheang Shi Hui	Australia; Karlee Davis	Philippines; Jeanette Reyes	Not awarded	25 November	Sabah International Convention Centre, Kota Kinabalu, Sabah	Malaysia	44	
27th	2024	Philippines; Liana Barrido	Thailand; Nattha Intasao	Venezuela; Milena Paola Soto Pérez	United Kingdom; Grace Richardson	Kyrgyzstan; Albina Kostikova	Singapore; Nicole Bacon	Vietnam; Vu Quynh Trang	13 December	Sunway Resort Hotel, Bandar Sunway, Subang, Selangor	Malaysia	40	
28th	2025	Poland; Zuzanna Balonek	Philippines; Christine Eds Enero	China; Bai Duo Lan (Doris Bai)	Colombia; Andrea Pineda	Kenya; Mitchelle Otieno	Thailand; Sasicha Duangket	Vietnam; Tan Sanh Vy Vo	18 October	Resorts World Genting, Genting Highlands, Bentong, Pahang	Malaysia	37	

=== Country by number of wins ===
Country/Territory	Titles	Winning years
Philippines	6	2000, 2012, 2013, 2017, 2019, 2024
Poland	3	1998, 1999, 2025
Thailand	3	2002, 2022, 2023
Indonesia	2	2018, 2021
India	2	2001, 2008
Brazil	1	2020
New Zealand	1	2016
Venezuela	1	2014
Malaysia	1	2011
Netherlands	1	2010
Germany	1	2009
Romania	1	2006
France	1	2005
United States	1	2004
South Africa	1	2003
Greece	1	1995
Australia	1	1994

Continents by number of wins

Continent	Titles	Years
Asia	13	2000, 2001, 2002, 2008, 2011, 2012, 2013, 2017, 2018, 2019, 2022, 2023, 2024
Europe	8	1995, 1998, 1999, 2005, 2006, 2009, 2010, 2025
Americas	3	2004, 2014, 2020
Oceania	2	1994, 2014
Africa	1	2003

==== Gallery of winners ====
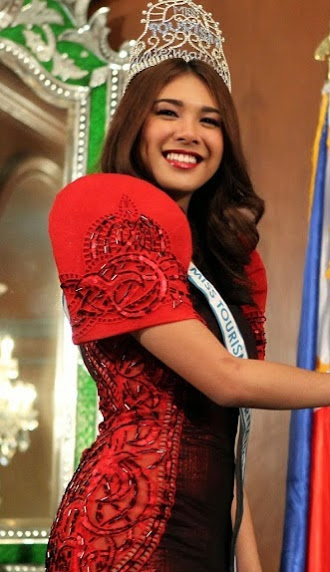
Miss Tourism International 2013/2014
Angeli Dione Gomez
Philippines

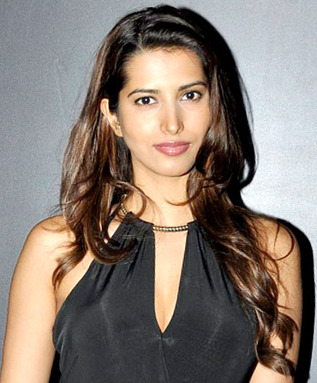
Miss Tourism International 2008/2009
Manasvi Mamgai
India

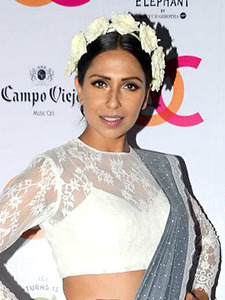
Miss Tourism International 2001/2002
Candice Pinto
India

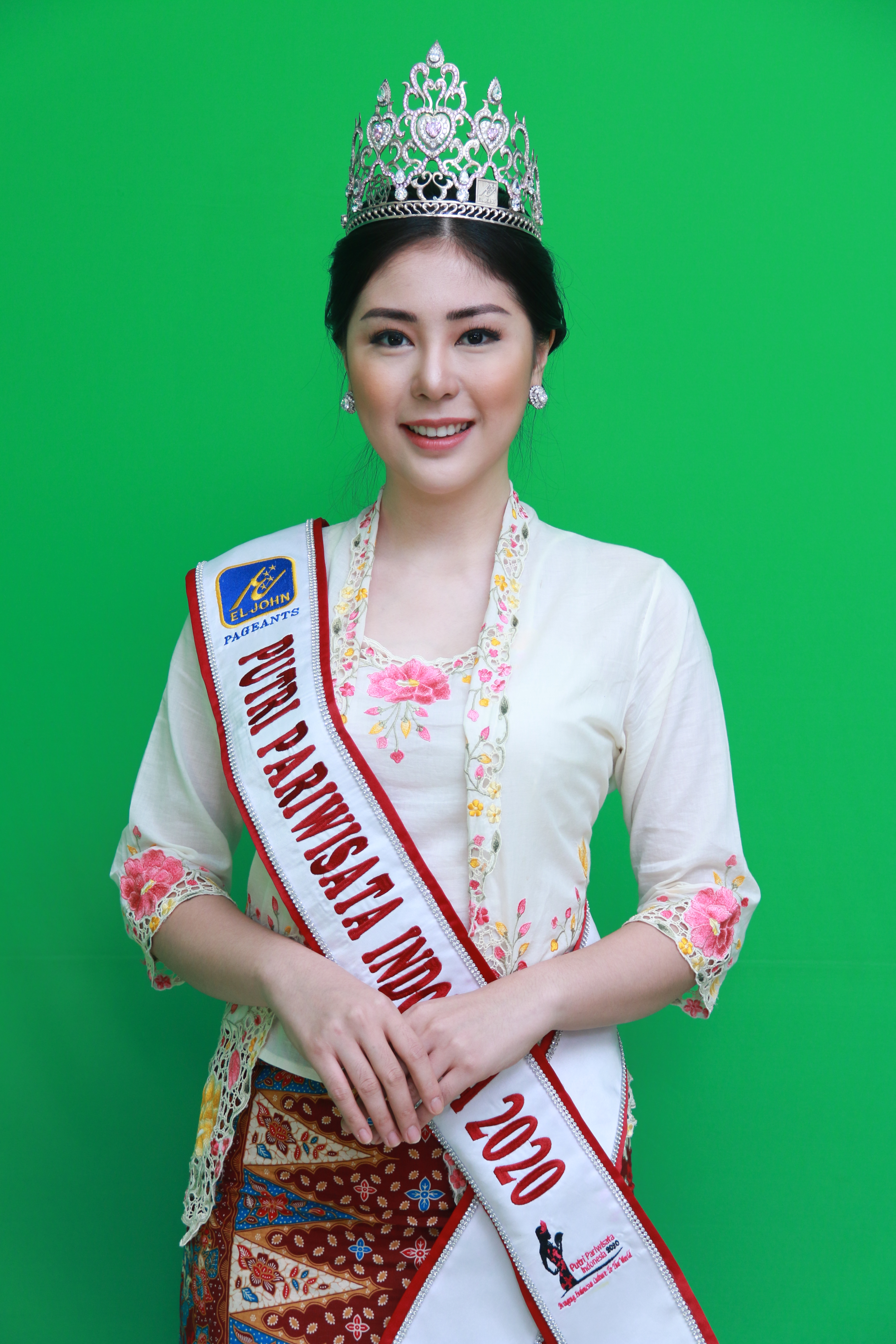
Miss Tourism International 2021/2022
Jessy Silana Wongsodiharjo
Indonesia

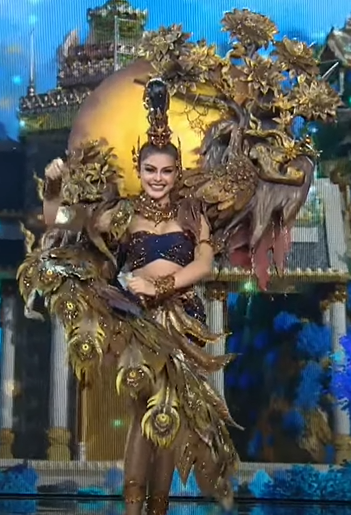
Miss Tourism International 2022/2023
Suphatra Kliangprom
Thailand

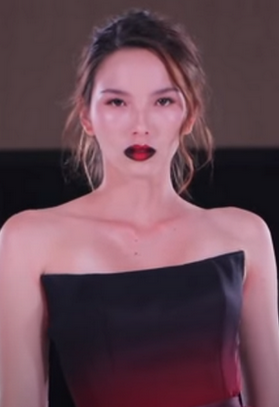
Miss Tourism International 2023/2024
Tia Li Taveepanichpan
Thailand

== Miss Tourism Queen of the Year International ==
Founded in 1993, this pageant was originally titled Miss Queen of the Year International. It was created to provide a platform for young women to showcase their leadership, personality, and commitment to tourism promotion.

Over the decades, it has evolved into a global brand that focuses on the "Queen of the Year" as a symbol of elegance and a spokesperson for international tourism and cultural exchange.

Color keys

- Miss Tourism Metropolitan International
- Miss Tourism Global
- Miss Tourism Cosmopolitan International
- Dreamgirl of the Year International

Edition	Year	Titleholder	Runners-Up				Venue	Host country	Entrants	Date	Ref.
Edition	Year	Titleholder	First	Second	Third	Fourth	Venue	Host country	Entrants	Date	Ref.
1st	1993	Norway; Rita Omvik	Australia; Jilly Edwards	Poland; Marzenna Wolska	United States; Celeste Weaver	Malaysia; Susan Manen	Kuala Lumpur	Malaysia	20	27 June	
2nd	1994	Australia; Georgina Denahy	Romania; Beatrice Vornicu	Czech Republic; Terezie Dobrovolna	Mexico; Susana Galvez Escobedo	Singapore; Janet Chew	Kuala Lumpur	Malaysia	24	16 July	
3rd	1995	Finland; Johanna Rosten	Malaysia; Previtha Thiyagarajah	United States; Kimberly Lawrence	Brazil; Mônica Guimarães Ferreira	Germany; Marita Nagel	Kuala Lumpur	Malaysia	22	18 June	
4th	1996	Philippines; Sherylle Capili Santarin	Malaysia; Kimberly Tan	Poland; Karolina Lappo	Guatemala; Karla Hannalore Forkel	Finland; Sari Nieminen	Kuala Lumpur	Malaysia	24	15 July	
5th	1997	Mexico; Kastany Vásquez	Norway; Silje Skaug Syvertsen	Philippines; Preciosa Reyes Valencia	Poland; Anna Fizek	Scotland; Valerie Hunter	Kuala Lumpur	Malaysia	24	15 June	
—N/a	1999	Philippines; Racquel Uy	No runners-up as no pageant was held; 1st Runner-up Miss Tourism International 1999								
6th	2000	Guatemala; Evelyn López Sandoval	Philippines; Christie Ann Pecson	Finland; Jenni Maria Dahlman	Thailand; Kanithakan Saengprachaksakula	Brazil; Simone Lima Freire	Kuala Lumpur	Malaysia	19	1 July	
—N/a	2001	Czech Republic; Zuzana Stepanovska	No runners-up as no pageant was held; 1st Runner-up Miss Tourism International 2001								
—N/a	2002	China; Yin Zi	No runners-up as no pageant was held; 1st Runner-up Miss Tourism International 2002								
—N/a	2003	Greece; Victoria Karyda	No runners-up as no pageant was held; 1st Runner-up Miss Tourism International 2003								
7th	2004	Armenia; Anush Grigorian	Singapore; Colleen Francisca Pereira	North Macedonia; Ana Gerasimovska	Russia; Yekaterina Filimonova	Estonia; Liis Lass	Changsha	China	31	29 October	
8th	2005	Taiwan; Shen Chia-Hui	Kazakhstan; Almagul Sagnayeva	Czech Republic; Edita Hortova	Paraguay; Karina Rebeca Naumann	Lithuania; Ruta Bartkeviciute	Wuhan	China	41	6 November	
9th	2006	Thailand; Ampika Chuanpreecha	Taiwan; Huang Cheng-Chieh	Canada; Tereza Schmied	Czech Republic; Jana Dolezelova	Kazakhstan; Zhanar Smagulova	Petaling Jaya	Malaysia	37	30 December	
—N/a	2008	Brazil; Cristine Franczak	No runners-up as no pageant was held; 1st Runner-up Miss Tourism International 2008								
—N/a	2009	Venezuela; Jéssica Carely Ibarra Petit	No runners-up as no pageant was held; 1st Runner-up Miss Tourism International 2009								
10th	2010	South Korea; Ha Hyun-jung	Indonesia; Rieke Caroline	Czech Republic; Tereza Fajksova	China; Michelle Li Dan	Belarus; Vasilina Velichko	Quinzhou	China	75	25 September	
11th	2011	India; Urvashi Rautela	Ukraine; Ivanna Gorschar	Poland; Amanda Warecka	Malaysia; Eugenee Ooi	South Korea; Pyung Hee Kong	Yingtan	China	53	5 November	
12th	2012	Lithuania; Asta Jakumaite	South Korea; Kim Young-joo	China; Liu Yan Jun	Denmark; Sarah Laerke Pedersen	Portugal; Nuria Aida Cardoso	Nanjing	China	49	4 December	
—N/a	2013	Thailand; Sunidporn Srisuwan	No runners-up as no pageant was held; 1st Runner-up Miss Tourism International 2013								
—N/a	2014	Thailand; Warangkanang Wutthayakorn	No runners-up as no pageant was held; 1st Runner-up Miss Tourism International 2014								
13th	2015	Philippines; Leren Mae Bautista	Uganda; Sheila Kirabo	Lithuania; Irmina Preisegalaviciute	Iceland; Tanja Yr Astthorsdottir	India; Chandni Sharma	Kuala Lumpur	Malaysia	57	31 December	
14th	2016	Chile; Sofía Saavedra	China; Wang Meng	Romania; Andreea-Liliana Popescu	Australia; Christy Taylor	India; Damanpreet Kaur Brar	Shanghai	China	55	18 December	
15th	2017	Russia; Katya Yakimova	Argentina; Oriana Nevora	Ghana; Belvy Naa Teide Ofori	Estonia; Susanna Lehtsalu	Mongolia; Gantulga Sodgerel	Shanghai Marriott Parkview Hotel, Shanghai	China	54	22 December	
—N/a	2019	Indonesia; Gabriella Mandolang	No runners-up as no pageant was held; 1st Runner-up Miss Tourism International 2018								
—N/a	2020	Thailand; Patchaploy Rueandaluang	No runners-up as no pageant was held; 1st Runner-up Miss Tourism International 2019								
—N/a	2021	Finland; Lily Korpela	No runners-up as no pageant was held; 1st Runner-up Miss Tourism International 2021								
—N/a	2022	Venezuela; Laura Virginia Zabaleta Casado	No runners-up as no pageant was held; 1st Runner-up Miss Tourism International 2022								
—N/a	2023	United Kingdom; Emily Cossey	No runners-up as no pageant was held; 1st Runner-up Miss Tourism International 2023								
—N/a	2024	Thailand; Natta Intasao	No runners-up as no pageant was held; 1st Runner-up Miss Tourism International 2024								
—N/a	2025	Philippines; Christine Eds Enero	No runners-up as no pageant was held; 1st Runner-up Miss Tourism International 2025								

No contest Miss Tourism Queen of the Year International

=== Country by number of wins ===
Country/Territory	Titles	Winning years
Thailand	5	2006, 2013, 2014, 2020, 2024
Philippines	4	1996, 1999, 2015, 2025
Venezuela	2	2009, 2022
Finland	2	1995, 2021
United Kingdom	1	2023
Indonesia	1	2019
Russia	1	2017
Chile	1	2016
Lithuania	1	2012
India	1	2011
Korea	1	2010
Brazil	1	2008
Taiwan	1	2005
Armenia	1	2004
Greece	1	2003
China	1	2002
Czech Republic	1	2001
Guatemala	1	2000
Mexico	1	1997
Australia	1	1994
Norway	1	1993

Continents by number of wins

Continent	Titles	Years
Asia	11	1996, 1999, 2002, 2004, 2005, 2006, 2010, 2011, 2013, 2014, 2019, 2020, 2024
Europe	8	1993, 1995, 2001, 2003, 2012, 2015, 2017, 2021, 2023, 2025
Americas	6	1997, 2000, 2008, 2009, 2016, 2022
Oceania	1	1994
Africa	0	

==== Gallery of winners ====
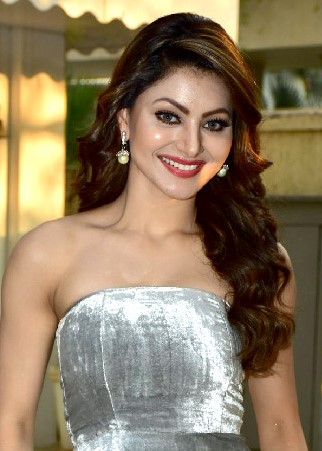
Miss Tourism Queen of the Year International 2011/2012
Urvashi Rautela
India

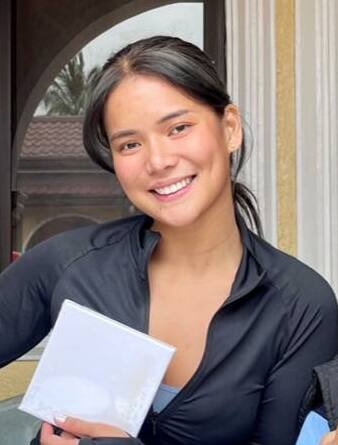
Miss Tourism Queen of the Year International 2015/2016
Leren Mae Bautista
Philippines

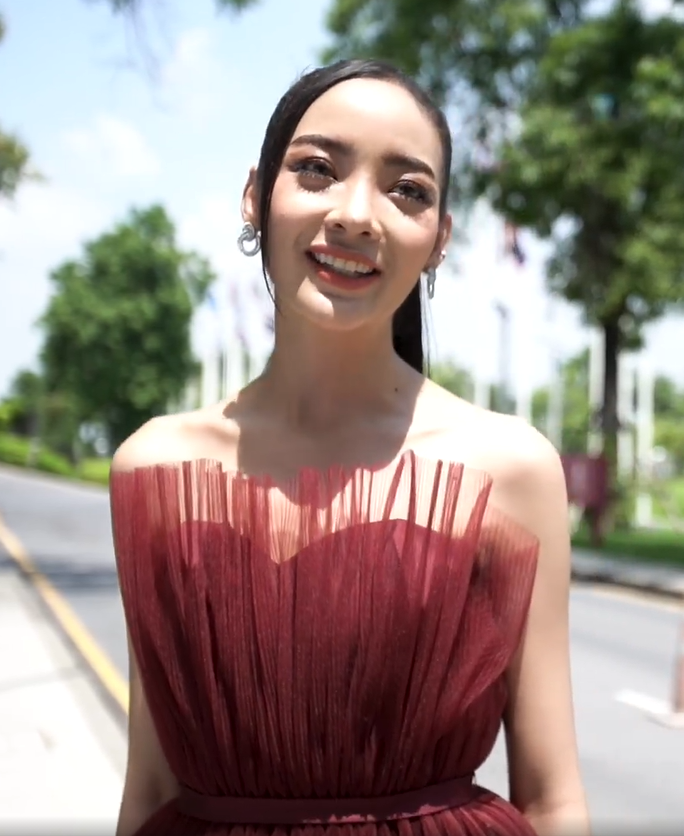
Miss Tourism Queen of the Year International 2020/2021
Patchaploy Rueandaluang
Thailand

== Miss Tourism Metropolitan International ==
Miss Tourism Metropolitan International is a world-class beauty pageant established in 2007. It was founded by Tan Sri Datuk Danny Ooi, the President of D’Touch International (Malaysia), who also manages the Miss Tourism International and Miss Chinese World brands.

The pageant was created with a specific focus on "Metropolitan Tourism," aiming to highlight the cultural richness, modern lifestyle, and tourism potential of major cities around the globe.

Edition	Year	Titleholder	Runners-Up				Venue	Host country	Entrants	Date	Ref.
Edition	Year	Titleholder	First	Second	Third	Fourth	Venue	Host country	Entrants	Date	Ref.
1st	2007	Romania; Sorina Neascu	Venezuela; Karen Virginia Blanco Camargo	Finland; Essi Pöysti	Thailand; Watcharawan Suntarintu	Philippines; Anna Marie Morelos	Kuala Lumpur	Malaysia	40	31 December	
—N/a	2008	Bosnia and Herzegovina; Alma Mulalic	No runners-up as no pageant was held; 2nd Runner-up Miss Tourism International 2008								
—N/a	2009	Brazil; Thays Calmany Neves	No runners-up as no pageant was held; 2nd Runner-up Miss Tourism International 2009								
—N/a	2010	Australia; Holly-Anne Visser	No runners-up as no pageant was held; 1st Runner-up Miss Tourism International 2010								
—N/a	2011	Panama; Carolina Del Carmen	No runners-up as no pageant was held; 1st Runner-up Miss Tourism International 2011								
—N/a	2012	Australia; Monika Radulovic	No runners-up as no pageant was held; 1st Runner-up Miss Tourism International 2012								
—N/a	2013	Australia; Sarah Czarnuch	No runners-up as no pageant was held; 2nd Runner-up Miss Tourism International 2013								
—N/a	2014	Philippines; Glennifer Perido	No runners-up as no pageant was held; 2nd Runner-up Miss Tourism International 2014								
—N/a	2015	Uganda; Sheila Kirabo	No runners-up as no pageant was held; 1st Runner-up Miss Tourism Queen of the Year International 2015								
2nd	2016	Thailand; Amanda Obdam	Philippines; Janela Joy Cuaton	Cambodia; Manita Hang	Costa Rica; Raquel María Guevara	China; Jia Zijun	Phnom Penh	Cambodia	41	18 November	
—N/a	2017	Poland; Maja Sieroń	No runners-up as no pageant was held; 1st Runner-up Miss Tourism International 2017								
—N/a	2018	Kenya; Sarah Chebet Pkyach	No runners-up as no pageant was held; 1st Runner-up Miss Tourism International 2018								
3rd	2019	Brazil; Lorrany Monteiro	Malaysia; Tiong Li San	United States; Stephanie Almeida	Portugal; Ana Mareoia	Russia; Valeriya Elfimova	NABA Theatre Naga World 2, Phnom Penh	Cambodia	30	14 December	
—N/a	2020	Indonesia; Clarita Mawarni Salem	No runners-up as no pageant was held; 2nd Runner-up Miss Tourism International 2020								
—N/a	2021	Vietnam; Hoang Thi Huong Ly	No runners-up as no pageant was held; 2nd Runner-up Miss Tourism International 2021								
—N/a	2022	Philippines; Maria Angelica Pantaliano	No runners-up as no pageant was held; 2nd Runner-up Miss Tourism International 2022								
—N/a	2023	Philippines; Jeanette Reyes	No runners-up as no pageant was held; 2nd Runner-up Miss Tourism International 2023								
—N/a	2024	Venezuela; Milena Paola Soto Pérez	No runners-up as no pageant was held; 2nd Runner-up Miss Tourism International 2024								
—N/a	2025	China; Bai Duo Lan (Doris Bai)	No runners-up as no pageant was held; 2nd Runner-up Miss Tourism International 2025								

No contest Miss Tourism Metropolitan International

=== Country by number of wins ===
Country/Territory	Titles	Winning years
Philippines	3	2014, 2022, 2023
Australia	3	2010, 2012, 2013
Brazil	2	2009, 2019
China	1	2025
Venezuela	1	2024
Vietnam	1	2021
Indonesia	1	2020
Kenya	1	2018
Poland	1	2017
Thailand	1	2016
Uganda	1	2015
Panama	1	2011
Bosnia and Herzegovina	1	2008
Romania	1	2007

Continents by number of wins

Continent	Titles	Years
Asia	7	2014, 2016, 2020, 2021, 2022, 2023, 2025
Americas	4	2009, 2011, 2019, 2024
Europe	3	2007, 2008, 2017
Oceania	3	2010, 2012, 2013
Africa	2	2015, 2018

==== Gallery of winners ====
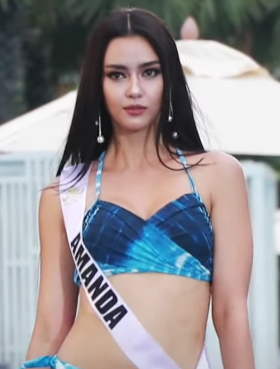
Miss Tourism Metropolitan International 2016/2017
Amanda Obdam
Thailand

== Miss Tourism Global titleholders ==
The Miss Tourism Global title was established to honor contestants who possess a truly "international" appeal and the ability to represent the tourism industry on a global scale.

In the hierarchy of D’Touch International pageants, this title is traditionally awarded to the 3rd Runner-Up (or the 4th-place finisher) during the Miss Tourism International Grand Final, held annually on New Year's Eve.

Year	Titleholder	Notes	Ref.
Miss Globe Beauty International
2000	France; Garnier Maud	No runners-up as no pageant was held; 2nd runner up Miss Tourism International 2000	
2004	Singapore; Nur Ashikeen Abd. Rahman	No runners-up as no pageant was held; 4th runner up Miss Tourism International 2004	
2005	Thailand; Porntip Prasertsong	No runners-up as no pageant was held; 4th runner up Miss Tourism International 2005	
2008	Thailand; Ananya Chinsangchai	No runners-up as no pageant was held; 3rd runner up Miss Tourism International 2008	
2009	Malaysia; Edwina Markus	No runners-up as no pageant was held; 3rd runner up Miss Tourism International 2009	
Miss Tourism Global
2010	Venezuela; Stephany Andreína González Socorro	No runners-up as no pageant was held; 2nd runner up Miss Tourism International 2010	
2011	Thailand; Patsarapon Khonkhamhaeng	No runners-up as no pageant was held; 2nd runner up Miss Tourism International 2011	
2012	Venezuela; Marielis Alejandra Castellanos Pérez	No runners-up as no pageant was held; 2nd runner up Miss Tourism International 2012	
2013	Dominican Republic; Michelle Alexis Torres	No runners-up as no pageant was held; 3rd runner up Miss Tourism International 2013	
2014	Netherlands; Charina Maria	No runners-up as no pageant was held; 3rd runner up Miss Tourism International 2014	
Miss Tourism Global International
2015	Lithuania; Irmina Presegalaviciute	No runners-up as no pageant was held; 2nd runner up Miss Tourism Queen of the Year International 2015	
Miss Tourism Global
2016	Australia; Tasha Laraine Ross	No runners-up as no pageant was held; 2nd runner up Miss Tourism International 2016	
2017	Australia; Diana Hills	No runners-up as no pageant was held; 2nd runner up Miss Tourism International 2017	
2018	Australia; Sandra Knight Callahan	No runners-up as no pageant was held; 2nd runner up Miss Tourism International 2018	
2019	Ukraine; Kateryna Kachashvili	No runners-up as no pageant was held; 2nd runner up Miss Tourism International 2019	
2020	Czech Republic; Tereza Bohuslavova	No runners-up as no pageant was held; 3rd runner up Miss Tourism International 2020	
2021	Nigeria; Toluwalope Olarewaju	No runners-up as no pageant was held; 3rd runner up Miss Tourism International 2021	
2022	Singapore; Crystal Huang Ruojia	No runners-up as no pageant was held; 3rd runner up Miss Tourism International 2022	
2023	Australia; Karlee Davis	No runners-up as no pageant was held; 4th runner up Miss Tourism International 2023	
Miss Tourism Global International
2024	Kyrgyzstan; Albina Kostikova	No runners-up as no pageant was held; 4th runner up Miss Tourism International 2024	
Miss Tourism Global
2025	Kenya; Mitchelle Otieno	No runners-up as no pageant was held; 4th runner up Miss Tourism International 2025	

No contest Miss Tourism Global

=== Country by number of wins ===
Country/Territory	Titles	Winning years
Australia	4	2016, 2017, 2018, 2023
Thailand	3	2005, 2008, 2011
Singapore	2	2004, 2022
Venezuela	2	2010, 2012
Kenya	1	2025
Kyrgyzstan	1	2024
Nigeria	1	2021
Czech Republic	1	2020
Ukraine	1	2019
Lithuania	1	2015
Netherlands	1	2014
Dominican Republic	1	2013
Malaysia	1	2009
France	1	2002

Continents by number of wins

Continent	Titles	Years
Asia	7	2004, 2005, 2008, 2009, 2011, 2022, 2024
Europe	5	2002, 2014, 2015, 2019, 2020
Oceania	4	2016, 2017, 2018, 2023
Americas	3	2010, 2012, 2013
Africa	2	2021, 2025

== Miss Tourism Cosmopolitan International ==
The title was officially introduced into the Miss Tourism International world final circuit to celebrate the "Cosmopolitan" woman—one who is sophisticated, well-traveled, and capable of navigating the diverse cultures of the modern world.

In the official ranking of the pageant's grand finale (traditionally held on New Year's Eve in Malaysia), this title is typically awarded to the 2nd Runner-Up (the 3rd-place finisher overall).

Year	Titleholder	Notes	Ref.
Miss Cosmopolitan International
1999	Costa Rica; Nidia Guzmán Jiménez	No runners-up as no pageant was held; 4th runner up Miss Tourism International 1999	
2000	Spain; Lourdes Martinez	No runners-up as no pageant was held; 4th runner up Miss Tourism International 2000	
2001	Malaysia; Lyndel Soon Gaid Sim	No runners-up as no pageant was held; 4th runner up Miss Tourism International 2001	
2002	Lebanon; Maha Hojeaj	No runners-up as no pageant was held; 4th runner up Miss Tourism International 2002	
2003	Czech Republic; Zuzana Putnarova	No runners-up as no pageant was held; 4th runner up Miss Tourism International 2003	
2004	China; Guan Shan Shan	No runners-up as no pageant was held; 3rd runner up Miss Tourism International 2004	
2005	Greece; Maria-Madalena Ergati	No runners-up as no pageant was held; 3rd runner up Miss Tourism International 2005	
2008	Hong Kong; Ruby Wong Hiu-chun	No runners-up as no pageant was held; 4th runner up Miss Tourism International 2008	
2009	Czech Republic; Gabriela Korinkova	No runners-up as no pageant was held; 4th runner up Miss Tourism International 2009	
2010	Philippines; Barbara de la Rosa Salvador	No runners-up as no pageant was held; 3rd runner up Miss Tourism International 2010	
2011	Singapore; Amanda Leong Li Ting	No runners-up as no pageant was held; 3rd runner up Miss Tourism International 2011	
2012	Paraguay; Lourdes María del Carmen Motta Rolón	No runners-up as no pageant was held; 3rd runner up Miss Tourism International 2012	
2013	Malaysia; Thaarah Ganesan	No runners-up as no pageant was held; 4th runner up Miss Tourism International 2013	
Miss Tourism Cosmopolitan International
2014	China; Sun Wen Cong	No runners-up as no pageant was held; 4th runner up Miss Tourism International 2014	
2015	Iceland; Tanja Yr Astthorsdottir	No runners-up as no pageant was held; 3rd runner up Miss Tourism Queen of the Year International 2015	
Miss Tourism Cosmopolitan
2016	Brazil; Thaina Carolina Magalhães Peres	No runners-up as no pageant was held; 1st runner up Miss Tourism International 2016	
Miss Tourism Cosmopolitan International
2017	Indonesia; Lois Merry Tangel	No runners-up as no pageant was held; 2nd runner up Miss Tourism International 2017	
2018	Latvia; Laura Škutāne	No runners-up as no pageant was held; 3rd runner up Miss Tourism International 2018	
2019	Poland; Joanna Babynko	No runners-up as no pageant was held; 3rd runner up Miss Tourism International 2019	
2020	Australia; Kate Moore	No runners-up as no pageant was held; 4th runner up Miss Tourism International 2020	
2021	Malaysia; How Zoo Ee	No runners-up as no pageant was held; 4th runner up Miss Tourism International 2021	
2022	United States; Alysa Cook	No runners-up as no pageant was held; 4th runner up Miss Tourism International 2022	
2023	Malaysia; Jen Cheang Shi Hui	No runners-up as no pageant was held; 3rd runner up Miss Tourism International 2023	
2024	United Kingdom; Grace Richardson	No runners-up as no pageant was held; 3rd runner up Miss Tourism International 2024	
2025	Colombia; Andrea Pineda	No runners-up as no pageant was held; 3rd runner up Miss Tourism International 2025	

No contest Miss Tourism Cosmopolitan International

=== Country by number of wins ===
Country/Territory	Titles	Winning years
Malaysia	4	2001, 2013, 2021, 2023
Czech Republic	2	2003, 2009
China	2	2004, 2014
Colombia	1	2025
United Kingdom	1	2024
United States	1	2022
Australia	1	2020
Poland	1	2019
Latvia	1	2018
Indonesia	1	2017
Brazil	1	2016
Iceland	1	2015
Paraguay	1	2012
Singapore	1	2011
Philippines	1	2010
Hong Kong	1	2008
Greece	1	2005
Lebanon	1	2002
Spain	1	2000
Costa Rica	1	1999

Continents by number of wins

Continent	Titles	Years
Asia	11	2001, 2002, 2004, 2008, 2010, 2011, 2013, 2014, 2017, 2021, 2023
Europe	8	2000, 2003, 2005, 2009, 2015, 2018, 2019, 2024
Americas	5	1999, 2012, 2016, 2022, 2025
Oceania	1	2020
Africa	0	

== Dreamgirl of the Year International ==
The Dreamgirl of the Year International was established in the early 1990s (first launched around 1994). Unlike the other "Tourism" specific titles, this crown was designed to find a winner who embodies the "Ideal Woman"—a combination of exceptional beauty, star quality, and a "dream-like" personality that appeals to the fashion and entertainment industries.

Year	Titleholder	Notes	Ref.
1999	Thailand; Nirachala Kumya	No runners-up as no pageant was held; 3rd runner up Miss Tourism International 1999	
2000	Ukraine; Olesya Krakhmalyova	No runners-up as no pageant was held; 3rd runner up Miss Tourism International 2000	
2001	China; Amy Yan Wei	No runners-up as no pageant was held; 3rd runner up Miss Tourism International 2001	
2002	Bosnia and Herzegovina; Aida Osmanovic	No runners-up as no pageant was held; 3rd runner up Miss Tourism International 2002	
2003	Argentina; Laura Constanza Romero Demelli	No runners-up as no pageant was held; 3rd runner up Miss Tourism International 2003	
2005	India; Shiriya Singh	No runners-up as no pageant was held; 3rd runner up Miss Tourism International 2003	
2010	Mongolia; Borgoljin Bayarsaikhan	No runners-up as no pageant was held; 4th runner up Miss Tourism International 2010	
2011	Czech Republic; Jana Kopecka	No runners-up as no pageant was held; 4th runner up Miss Tourism International 2011	
2012	Malaysia; Jun Yong Wan	No runners-up as no pageant was held; 4th runner up Miss Tourism International 2012	
2015	India; Chandni Sharma	No runners-up as no pageant was held; 4th runner up Miss Tourism Queen of the Year International 2015	
Miss Dreamgirl of the Year
2016	Mexico; Ximena Delgado Mendez	No runners-up as no pageant was held; 3rd runner up Miss Tourism International 2016	
Dreamgirl of the Year International
2017	Brazil; Júlia Horta	No runners-up as no pageant was held; 4th runner up Miss Tourism International 2017	
2018	Philippines; Julieane Medina Fernandez	No runners-up as no pageant was held; 4th runner up Miss Tourism International 2018	
2019	Cambodia; Sotima John	No runners-up as no pageant was held; 4th runner up Miss Tourism International 2019	
2020	Bolivia; Luz Elva Claros Gallardo	No runners-up as no pageant was held; 5th runner up Miss Tourism International 2020	
2021	Paraguay; Araceli Dominguez	No runners-up as no pageant was held; 5th runner up Miss Tourism International 2021	
2022	New Zealand; Abigail Curd	No runners-up as no pageant was held; 5th runner up Miss Tourism International 2022	
Miss Dreamgirl of the Year
2024	Singapore; Nicole Bacon	No runners-up as no pageant was held; Special Awards Miss Tourism International 2024	
Dreamgirl of the Year International
2025	Thailand; Sasicha Duangket	No runners-up as no pageant was held; Special Awards Miss Tourism International 2025	

No contest Miss Dreamgirl of the Year International

=== Country by number of wins ===
Country/Territory	Titles	Winning years
Thailand	2	1999, 2025
India	2	2005, 2015
Singapore	1	2024
New Zealand	1	2022
Paraguay	1	2021
Bolivia	1	2020
Cambodia	1	2019
Philippines	1	2018
Brazil	1	2017
Mexico	1	2016
Malaysia	1	2012
Czech Republic	1	2011
Mongolia	1	2010
Argentina	1	2003
Bosnia and Herzegovina	1	2002
China	1	2001
Ukraine	1	2000

Continents by number of wins

Continent	Titles	Years
Asia	10	1999, 2001, 2005, 2010, 2012, 2015, 2018, 2019, 2024, 2025
Americas	5	2003, 2016, 2017, 2020, 2021
Europe	3	2000, 2002, 2011
Oceania	1	2002
Africa	0	

== Miss South East Asia Tourism Ambassadress ==
Miss South East Asia Tourism Ambassadress or Miss South East Asia title is a prestigious regional beauty pageant and honorary title founded in 1992 by Tan Sri Datuk Danny Ooi, the President of D’Touch International in Malaysia.

The pageant was created with the specific mission of fostering regional cooperation and promoting tourism among the member nations of ASEAN (Association of Southeast Asian Nations).

Edition	Year	Titleholder	Runners-Up				Venue	Host country	Entrants	Date	Ref.
Edition	Year	Titleholder	First	Second	Third	Fourth	Venue	Host country	Entrants	Date	Ref.
Miss South East Asia
1st	1992	Philippines; Amelia Joy de la Cruz	Malaysia; Penny Soon	Malaysia; Samantha Schubert	Philippines; Viftra Burgos	Singapore; Sharon Tan	Kuala Lumpur	Malaysia	14	29 July	
2nd	1993	Thailand; Chutima Nurunsitirat	Malaysia; Rachelle Ng	Philippines; Viftra Burgos	Not awarded		Singapore		16	26 June	
—N/a	2012	Thailand; Suputra Chucharoen	No runners-up as no pageant was held; 5th runner up Miss Tourism International 2012								
—N/a	2013	Vietnam; Phan Hoang Thu	No runners-up as no pageant was held; 5th runner up Miss Tourism International 2013								
—N/a	2014	Vietnam; Nguyen Dieu Linh	No runners-up as no pageant was held; 5th runner up Miss Tourism International 2014								
Miss South East Asia Tourism Ambassadress
3rd	2015	Thailand; Yada Theppanom	Philippines; Alexandra Mae Rosales	Indonesia; Falentina Cotton	Not awarded		Petaling Jaya	Malaysia	16	2 October	
—N/a	2016	Indonesia; Dikna Faradiba Maharani	No runners-up as no pageant was held; 4th runner up Miss Tourism International 2016								
—N/a	2017	Thailand; Kamonrat Thanon	No runners-up as no pageant was held; 5th runner up Miss Tourism International 2017								
—N/a	2018	Malaysia; Caenne Ng	No runners-up as no pageant was held; 5th runner up Miss Tourism International 2018								
—N/a	2019	Thailand; Chompoonut Phungphon	No runners-up as no pageant was held; 5th runner up Miss Tourism International 2019								
—N/a	2020	Malaysia; Lim Sue Anne	No runners-up as no pageant was held; 6th runner up Miss Tourism International 2020								
—N/a	2021	Philippines; Keinth Jensen Petrasanta	No runners-up as no pageant was held; 6th runner up Miss Tourism International 2021								
—N/a	2022	Malaysia; Phoebe Ong Yi Huui	No runners-up as no pageant was held; 6th runner up Miss Tourism International 2022								
—N/a	2023	Philippines; Jeanette Reyes	No runners-up as no pageant was held; Special Awards Miss Tourism International 2023								
—N/a	2024	Vietnam; Vũ Quỳnh Trang	No runners-up as no pageant was held; Special Awards Miss Tourism International 2024								
—N/a	2025	Vietnam; Tan Sanh Vy Vo	No runners-up as no pageant was held; Special Awards Miss Tourism International 2025								

No contest Miss South East Asia Tourism Ambassadress

=== Country by number of wins ===
Country/Territory	Titles	Winning years
Thailand	5	1993, 2012, 2015, 2017, 2019
Vietnam	4	2013, 2014, 2024, 2025
Philippines	3	1992, 2021, 2023
Malaysia	3	2018, 2020, 2022
Indonesia	1	2016

Continents by number of wins

Continent	Titles	Years
Mainland	9	1993, 2012, 2013, 2014, 2015, 2017, 2019, 2024, 2025
Maritime	7	1992, 2016, 2018, 2020, 2021, 2022, 2023

==== Gallery of winners ====
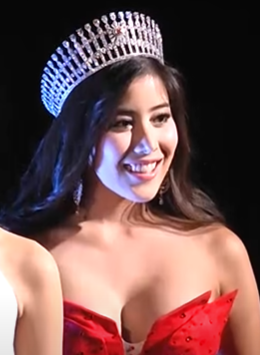
Miss South East Asia Tourism Ambassadress 2015/2016
Yada Theppanom
Thailand

== Miss Intercontinental International ==
Year	Titleholder	Notes	Ref.
1999	Finland; Ruut Kaangas	No runner-ups as no pageant was held; 3rd runner up Miss Tourism International 1999	
2000	Venezuela; María Cristina López Palacios	No runner-ups as no pageant was held; 2nd runner up Miss Tourism International 2000	
2001	Poland; Monika Gruda	No runners-ups as no pageant was held; 2nd runner up Miss Tourism International 2001	
2002	Turkey; Ebru Günzel	No runners-ups as no pageant was held; 2nd runner up Miss Tourism International 2002	
2003	China; Xing Hui Yuan	No runners-ups as no pageant was held; 2nd runner up Miss Tourism International 2003	
2004	Ukraine; Marina Gorobets	No runners-ups as no pageant was held; 1st runner up Miss Tourism International 2004	
2005	Taiwan; Chang Ta-Hsin	No runners-ups as no pageant was held; 1st runner up Miss Tourism International 2005	

No contest Miss Intercontinental International

=== Country by number of wins ===
Country/Territory	Titles	Winning years
Taiwan	1	2005
Ukraine	1	2004
China	1	2003
Turkey	1	2002
Poland	1	2001
Venezuela	1	2000
Finland	1	1999

Continents by number of wins

Continent	Titles	Years
Asia	3	2002, 2003, 2005
Europe	2	1999, 2001
Americas	1	2000
Africa	0	
Oceania	0	

== Miss Chinese World ==
Miss Chinese World
- Parent organization: Miss Chinese World Sdn Bhd.
- Headquarters: Kuala Lumpur, Malaysia
- First edition: 2005
- Most recent edition: 2023
- Current titleholder: Anie Uson; Philippines
- P: Tan Sri Datuk Danny Ooi
- Language: Chinese, English
- Website: Official website

Miss Chinese World (Chinese: 世界华人美后), or MCW is an annual international beauty pageant that celebrates Chinese culture, heritage, and values. It was founded in 2005 by Tan Sri Datuk Danny Ooi, a prominent Malaysian pageant organizer and the President of D’Touch International (the same organization behind Miss Tourism International).

Unlike many global pageants that focus solely on nationality, this pageant is specifically for women of Chinese descent from all over the world, regardless of the country they currently reside in.

== Titleholders ==
Edition	Year	Titleholder	Runners-Up		Venue	Host country	Entrants	Date	Ref.
Edition	Year	Titleholder	First	Second	Venue	Host country	Entrants	Date	Ref.
1st	2005	Bangkok, Thailand; Sunisa Pasuk	TaiChung, Taiwan; Li Yen Chin	HangZhou, China; Chen Shuai	Kuala Lumpur	Malaysia	30	11 July	
2nd	2011	Jinan, China; Xu Wen Xi	Perth, Australia; Li Zhu Jun	Vancouver, Canada; Jessica Yeung Wai-Ping	Kuala Lumpur	Malaysia	35	10 Sept	
3rd	2017	Shanghai, China; Yin Zhuo Qun	Taipei, Taiwan; Chang Yu Chin	Qingdao, China; Dai Tian	Kuala Lumpur	Malaysia	31	20 May	
4th	2021	Taipei, Taiwan; Kao Man Jung	Johor, Malaysia; Aun Li Ying	Pontianak, Indonesia; Aldora Helsa Goewyn	Virtual Pageant		24	18 August	
5th	2023	Manila, Philippines; Anie Uson	Tangerang, Indonesia; Joan Angelina	Melaka, Malaysia; Yoong Jia Yi	Berjaya Times Square Hotel, Kuala Lumpur	Malaysia	17	20 May	
6th	2026	Xinjiang, China; Zulimire Tuerxun	Nonthaburi, Thailand; Patcharamon Thepraksa	Hong Kong, China; Bernice Yuen	Berjaya Times Square Hotel, Kuala Lumpur	Malaysia	18	30 May	

=== Country by number of wins ===
Country/Territory	Titles	Winning years
China	3	2011, 2017, 2026
Philippines	1	2023
Taiwan	1	2021
Thailand	1	2005

Continents by number of wins

Continent	Titles	Years
Asia	5	2005, 2011,2017, 2021, 2023, 2026
Americas	0	
Europe	0	
Africa	0	
Oceania	0	

== See also ==
- List of beauty contests
