= Zabina Khan =

Indian model and beauty queen (born 1984)

- Born: Zabina Abdul Rashid Khan; 17 September 1984 (age 42); Mumbai, Maharashtra, India
- Other names: Zabyn, Zabyn Khan
- Occupations: Model, actress, director
- Height: 1.75 m (5 ft 9 in)
- Beauty pageant titleholder
- Title: Gladrags Megamodel Tourism Queen 2004; Miss Tourism Queen International 2004
- Major competition: Miss Tourism Queen International 2004

Zabina Khan, also known as Zabyn Khan (born 17 September 1984), is an Indian model, beauty queen, actress, assistant director. She was crowned the first Miss Tourism Queen International in the year 2004.

== Early life and career ==
Born in India on December 12, 1984 to a Muslim family.

At the age of 19, she competed in Gladrags Manhunt and Megamodel Contest in 2004 and was selected to compete in the first edition of Miss Tourism Queen International. She also competed in the first edition of Miss Tourism Queen International held in China in 2004 and was declared the eventual winner. She is the first ever winner in the pageant's history.

Zabina aka Zabyn Khan is an actress and assistant director, known for Hulchul (2004), Aashiq Banaya Aapne (2005), Ek Hasina Ek Khiladi (2005), Bluffmaster (2005), Vettaiyaadu Vilaiyaadu (2006), Godava (2007), Jagadam (2007), Panga Na Lo (2007), Villu (2008), Sanchalam (2011), Shivajinagar (2014). Assistant director for Action Jackson (2014), Solo (2017), Navrasa (2021)

She is currently working as Entertainment Director for Big Daddy casino and Strike Casino, Goa known for her shows Our Stage your Talent (2019).

Big Bash (2018 - 2022), Freedom Fiesta (2018 - 2021)

Awards and achievements
Preceded by ---	Gladrags Megamodel Tourism Queen; 2004	Succeeded by Neha Oberoi
Preceded by ---	Miss Tourism Queen International; 2004	Succeeded by (Greece) Nikoletta Ralli
