= Baazi Kiski =

Indian game show

- Logo
- Created by: National Lottery
- Presented by: Ashutosh Rana
- Country of origin: India
- Original language: Hindi
- No. of seasons: 1
- No. of episodes: Total 53

Production
- Executive producer: Danie Ferreira
- Production locations: Urban Brew Studios, Johannesburg
- Running time: 30 minutes
- Production company: Urban Brew Studios

Original release
- Network: Zee TV
- Release: 2 September 2001

Baazi Kiski is an Indian game show which premiered on Zee Tv on 2 September 2001. The game show is hosted by actor Ashutosh Rana, and involves a gender-war between men and women for a total cash prize of 21,000 rupees per contestant. The show replaced Zee TV's game show Sawaal Dus Crore Ka, which did not meet audiences expectations.

== Overview ==
The show revolves around the concept of gender battle between 'men vs. women'. It comprised 5 rounds starting with the elimination round; hence the process of eliminating the participant (man or woman) until that participant get to face each other on a one-to-one basis. The game show contains a buzzer round and prizes being given away in cash. Besides offering the cash prize, there are other prizes that are offered in the game, such as refrigerators, cars and television sets.

== Rating ==
Baazi Kiski was a fairly successful series, usually finishing in the top 16 shows for the weeks in which it aired. Despite not getting the desired TRPs, the show managed to cling the title of the best rated programme among the 16 programmes that were launched simultaneously by Zee TV in prime time. In fact, the show was at No. 2 among all the game shows on all Indian networks that aired in the year 2001. The following are the list of game shows on various Indian television networks that Baazi Kiski was compared to:

Programme	TRP Rating	Relative to 'Top 5'	Relative to 16 'NEW' programmes launched together	Channel
Khullja Sim Sim	10.22	71.83	N/A	STAR One
Baazi Kiski	2.44	43.87	183.98	Zee TV
Kya Masti Kya Dhoom	6.43	45.18	N/A	STAR Plus
Nilaam Ghar - Bid Bid Boom	1.61	29.05	121.83	Zee TV

††Source: TAM Peoplemeter, September 2001
